= Caio (name) =

Caio is a Portuguese masculine given name derived from the Latin name Gaius.

== List of people with the name ==
- Caio (footballer, born 1999), Brazilian footballer
- Caio Fernando Abreu (1948–1996), Brazilian writer
- Caio Alves (born 1986), Brazilian footballer
- Caio Blat (born 1980), Brazilian actor
- Caio Blinder (born 1957), Brazilian journalist
- Caio Bonfim (born 1991), Brazilian racewalker
- Caio Castro (born 1989), Brazilian actor
- Caio César (1988–2015), Brazilian voice actor
- Caio Collet (born 2002), Brazilian racing driver
- Caio Canedo Corrêa (born 1990), Brazilian footballer
- Caio De Cenco (born 1989), Italian footballer
- Caio Lucas Fernandes (born 1994), Brazilian footballer
- Caio Fonseca (born 1959), American painter
- Caio Domenico Gallo (1697–1780), Italian historian
- Caio Japa (born 1983), Brazilian futsal player
- Caio Júnior (1965–2016), Brazilian football manager
- Caio Koch-Weser (born 1944), German politician
- Caio Lauxtermann (born 2003), German gymnast
- Caio Magalhães (born 1987), Brazilian mixed martial artist
- Caio Vianna Martins (1923–1938), Brazilian scout
- Caio Mendes (born 1986), Brazilian footballer
- Caio Pizzoli, Brazilian ten-pin bowler
- Caio Prado Júnior (1907–1990), Brazilian historian
- Caio Rangel (born 1996), Brazilian footballer
- Caio Ribeiro (born 1975), Brazilian international footballer
- Caio Henrique Siqueira Sanchez (born 1993), Brazilian footballer
- Caio Secco (born 1990), Brazilian footballer
- Antônio Caio da Silva Sousa (born 1980), Brazilian footballer
- Caio Souza (born 1993), Brazilian artistic gymnast
- Caio Terra (born 1986), Brazilian jiu-jitsu practitioner
- Caio Torres (born 1987), Brazilian basketball player
- Caio Danilo Laursen Tuponi (born 1992), Brazilian footballer
- Caio Zampieri (born 1986), Brazilian tennis player
- Wolnei Caio (born 1968), Brazilian footballer
- Rodrigo Caio (born 1993), Brazilian international footballer

== See also ==
- Caio (disambiguation)
- Caius (disambiguation)
- Gaius
