= Caiazzo (surname) =

Caiazzo is a toponymic surname of Italian origin from Caiazzo, Campania, which is derived from the personal name Caio, a form of the Latin name Gaius. Notable people with the surname include:

- Chris Caiazzo (fl. 2015–present), American politician
- John Kronus (real name George Caiazzo; 1969–2007), American professional wrestler
- Sara Caiazzo (born 2003), Italian footballer
