= Gaius (disambiguation) =

Gaius is a common Latin praenomen.

Gaius may also refer to:

- Gaius (biblical figure), a figure in the New Testament of the Bible
- Gaius (jurist), Roman jurist
- Gaius (praenomen) Latin praenomen or personal name
- Gaius (spider), spider genus

== See also ==
- Caius (disambiguation)
