= Caius =

In Latin, Caius is an archaic spelling of the Latin praenomen Gaius, pronounced /ga:ius/. In early Latin, the letter C was used for both /g/ and /k/; and the names Gaius and Gnaeus were spelt Caius and Cnaius and continued to be so in inscriptions, after the letter G was introduced, and C was confined to the /k/ sound. Notably, the name of Gaius Iulius Caesar is abbreviated CIC.

In English, Caius is a latinized spelling of the last name of John Keys of Gonville and Caius College, Cambridge.

Caius may refer to:

== People ==
=== Given name ===
==== Ancient world ====
- Pope Caius (died 296), Bishop of Rome and martyr
- Caius (bishop of Milan), bishop of Milan in the early 3rd-century, saint
- Caius (presbyter), early 3rd century Christian writer
- Caius Largennius (died c. 50), Roman legionary

==== Modern era ====
- Caius of Korea (1571–1624), Catholic missionary, one of the Martyrs of Japan
- Caius Brediceanu (1879–1953), Romanian politician and diplomat
- Caius Gabriel Cibber (1630–1700), Danish sculptor
- Caius Iacob (1912–1992), Romanian mathematician and politician
- Caius Lungu (1989–2025), Romanian footballer
- Caius Novac (1821–?), Romanian footballer
- Caius Welcker (1885–1939), Dutch footballer

=== Surname ===
- Jean Ferdinand Caius (1877–1944), French botanist and naturalist who worked in India
- John Caius the Elder (fl. 1480), English poet
- John Caius (1510–1573), English physician and second founder of Gonville and Caius College, Cambridge
- Thomas Caius (died 1572), English academic and administrator, Fellow and Master of University College, Oxford

== Fictional characters ==
=== In Shakespeare's plays ===
- Caius, in the play King Lear, the name that the Earl of Kent takes when in disguise
- Caius, the protagonist in Coriolanus
- Caius Lucius, Roman ambassador and later general in Cymbeline
- Doctor Caius, a French doctor in The Merry Wives of Windsor
- Caius, a casual name used in Camus' play Caligula to refer to the tyrannical emperor of the same name.

=== Other ===
- Caius, in Sir John in Love, a 1929 English opera by Ralph Vaughan Williams, based on Shakespeare's The Merry Wives of Windsor
- Caius, in the book The Skystone by Jack Whyte
- Caius, in the Twilight series by Stephenie Meyer
- Caius Ballad, the main antagonist in the video game Final Fantasy XIII-2
- Caius Cosades, Grand Spymaster of the Blades in the video game The Elder Scrolls III: Morrowind
- Caius, in the 1960 film Spartacus, played by John Hoyt
- Caius Lao Vistaille, one of the protagonists in the manga (and later anime based on it) The Titan's Bride
- Caius Qualls, the main protagonist of the video game Tales of the Tempest
- Caius, an AI warrior played by Cameron Monaghan in the film Tron: Ares

== See also ==
- Caius Choirbook, an illuminated choirbook
- Caio (disambiguation)
- Cayo (disambiguation)
- Cai (name)
