= Cayo =

Cayo or cayó may refer to:

- Cayo (film), a 2005 Puerto Rican film starring Roselyn Sánchez
- Cayo District, a district in the west of the nation of Belize
  - San Ignacio, Belize, a town in the Cayo District (originally named "El Cayo")
  - San Ignacio–Santa Elena, twin towns in the Cayo District (popularly known as "Cayo")
- Caio, Carmarthenshire, a village in Wales sometimes spelt with a 'y'
  - Cayo Hundred, a geographic division named after the village
- Cayó, a 2022 song by Arca
- Elsa Cayo (born 1951), Peruvian filmmaker

== See also ==
- Caio (disambiguation)
- Cay (sand island)
