= Grim's Dyke =

House and estate in Harrow Weald, London, England

Coordinates: 51.6232°N 0.3522°W

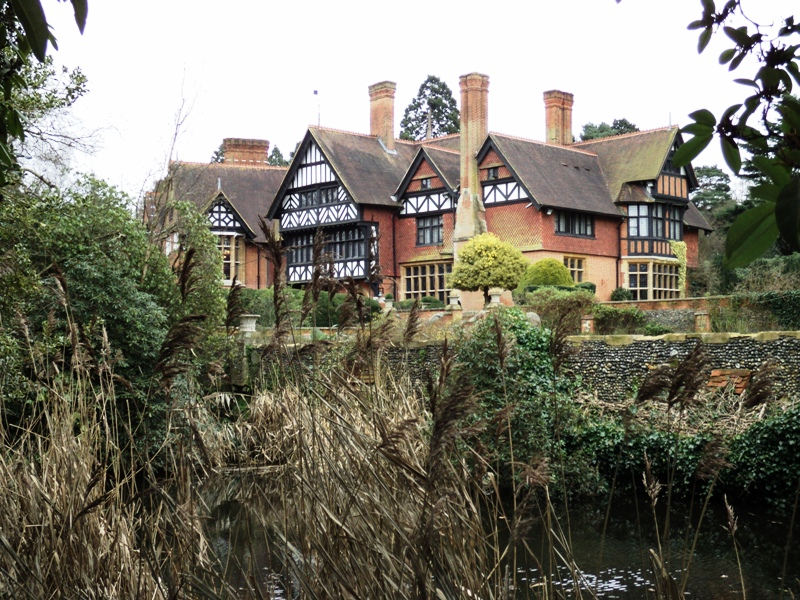
- The main entrance

- Location within London Borough of Harrow
- Location: Old Redding

History
- Built: 1872

Site notes
- Area: Harrow Weald
- Architect: Richard Norman Shaw

Listed Building – Grade II*
- Official name: Grimsdyke
- Designated: 5 September 1969
- Reference no.: 1079676

National Register of Historic Parks and Gardens
- Official name: Grims Dyke
- Designated: 5 July 1996
- Reference no.: 1001254

Grim's Dyke (sometimes called Graeme's Dyke until late 1891) is a house and estate in Harrow Weald, in northwest London, England. The house was built from 1870 to 1872 by Richard Norman Shaw for painter Frederick Goodall and named after the nearby prehistoric earthwork known as Grim's Ditch. It was converted into a hotel, Grim's Dyke Hotel, in 1970.

The house is best known as the home of the dramatist W. S. Gilbert, of the opera partnership Gilbert and Sullivan, who lived and farmed there for the last two decades of his life. He died while attempting to save a girl from drowning in his lake. Lady Gilbert and the Gilberts' ward, Nancy McIntosh, lived there until her death in 1936. The statue of Charles II now found in Soho Square stood on the property from about 1880 to 1938. The house was then used as a rehabilitation centre until 1963.

From 1963, the house was used mainly as a location for films and television, including Futtocks End and The Avengers. Since its conversion into a hotel, the house continues to be used as a film location. The hotel leases 30 of the original 110 acres of land that Gilbert purchased with the house.

== History ==
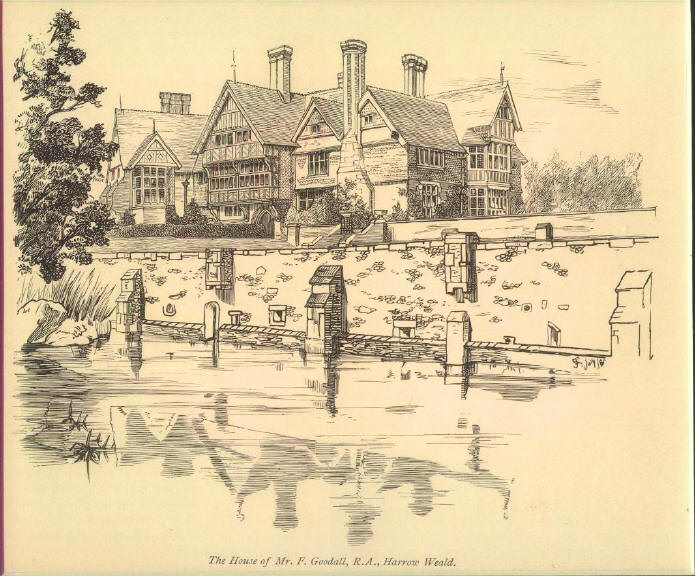
Grim's Dyke from the dyke in 1881

The house was designed in 1870 by Richard Norman Shaw for the Victorian era painter Frederick Goodall, who had purchased 110 acres (0.45 km^{2}) of land at Harrow Weald in 1856, but he did not begin to build until a lease on the property expired. Shaw's design for the house included aspects of Gothic Revivalism, added to a late-Elizabethan style, which included high red-tiled gables, tall clustered chimneys and leaded lights. To the north of the house, Shaw built a small lodge, a walled garden and various outhouses and a stable block, later converted into garages by W. S. Gilbert for his collection of motorcars. Over the dyke (now a duck pond) Shaw built two stone bridges, which incorporated flint from the ruined church at Stanmore. Construction on the house was completed in 1872. Goodall's ground-floor studio was built on a north–south axis in order to catch the light. Goodall sold the property in 1880 to Robert Heriot of Hambros Bank, who added a billiard room in 1883. Windsor Castle is visible from the house.

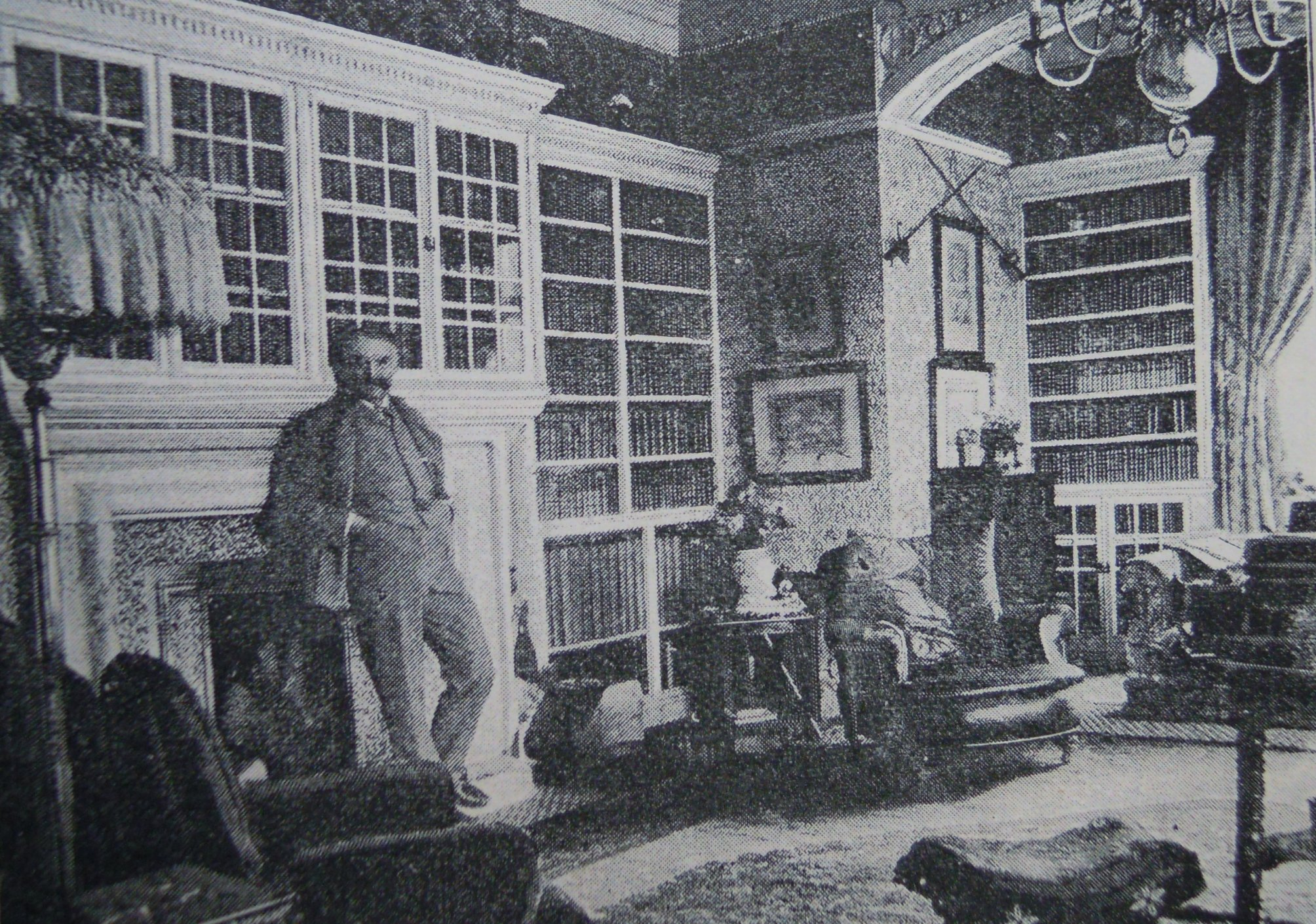
Gilbert in his library in 1891

W. S. Gilbert purchased the property in August 1890 for £4,000. He made various additions and alterations to the property, including an elaborate fireplace of Cornish alabaster in Goodall's studio, which became Gilbert's drawing/music room. At the house, Gilbert wrote his last ten works from an armchair in his library overlooking the croquet lawn. Gilbert also had an observatory for stargazing.

Arthur Sullivan visited Grim's Dyke with his nephew, Herbert, on 27 May 1893. They stayed at the house for three days while Sullivan worked with Gilbert to finalise Utopia, Limited. At the house, Gilbert had a vinery, apiary, orchards and a farm, with Jersey cattle, horses, pigs and fowl. He also kept a variety of exotic animals including monkeys, lemurs, a lynx and many others. Lady Gilbert designed the 30 acres of ornamental gardens at the house, including the rose garden and orchard, which remain on the hotel grounds. After Gilbert's death in 1911, Lady Gilbert and the Gilberts' companion, Nancy McIntosh, continued to live there until Lady Gilbert's own death in 1936.

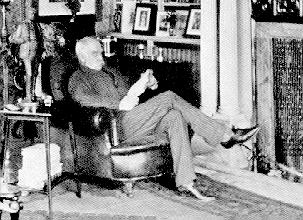
Gilbert in the library in later years

After Lady Gilbert's death, the contents of the house, apart from a few items kept by Nancy McIntosh, were sold at public auction on 17 and 18 March 1937, realising £4,600. The house was acquired jointly by the Middlesex County Council and the London County Council, who leased it to the North West Regional Hospital Board from 1937 to 1962, at first as a rehabilitation centre for women suffering from tuberculosis (the house was used by the services during World War II). Following the war, both sexes were admitted, and from 1948 only male patients were admitted. From 1963, the house was used primarily as a location for films and television, including Futtock's End with Ronnie Barker. It was converted into a hotel in 1970. It was featured in John Betjeman's acclaimed television documentary Metro-Land (1973). The hotel was seen in an off set episode of EastEnders in 2003.

The house and its gatehouse are both listed buildings. Harrow Council owns the building and the remaining 30 acres of the estate and has leased them to the hotel since 1970. The hotel and estate were refurbished in 1996 at a cost of £3 million. Presentations of Gilbert and Sullivan operas and other entertainments are regularly held by Grim's Dyke Opera. The remainder of the lands have been separated from the hotel and were sold by Harrow Council as "Grimsdyke Farm".

The house and gardens's history were described in detail by the hotel's head gardiner, Helenka Jurgielewicz, in 2024 in The London Gardener.

The name Grim's Dyke is sometimes used to refer to a nearby earthwork known as Grim's Ditch, which runs from Pinner Hill to Bentley Priory.

== Statue of Charles II ==
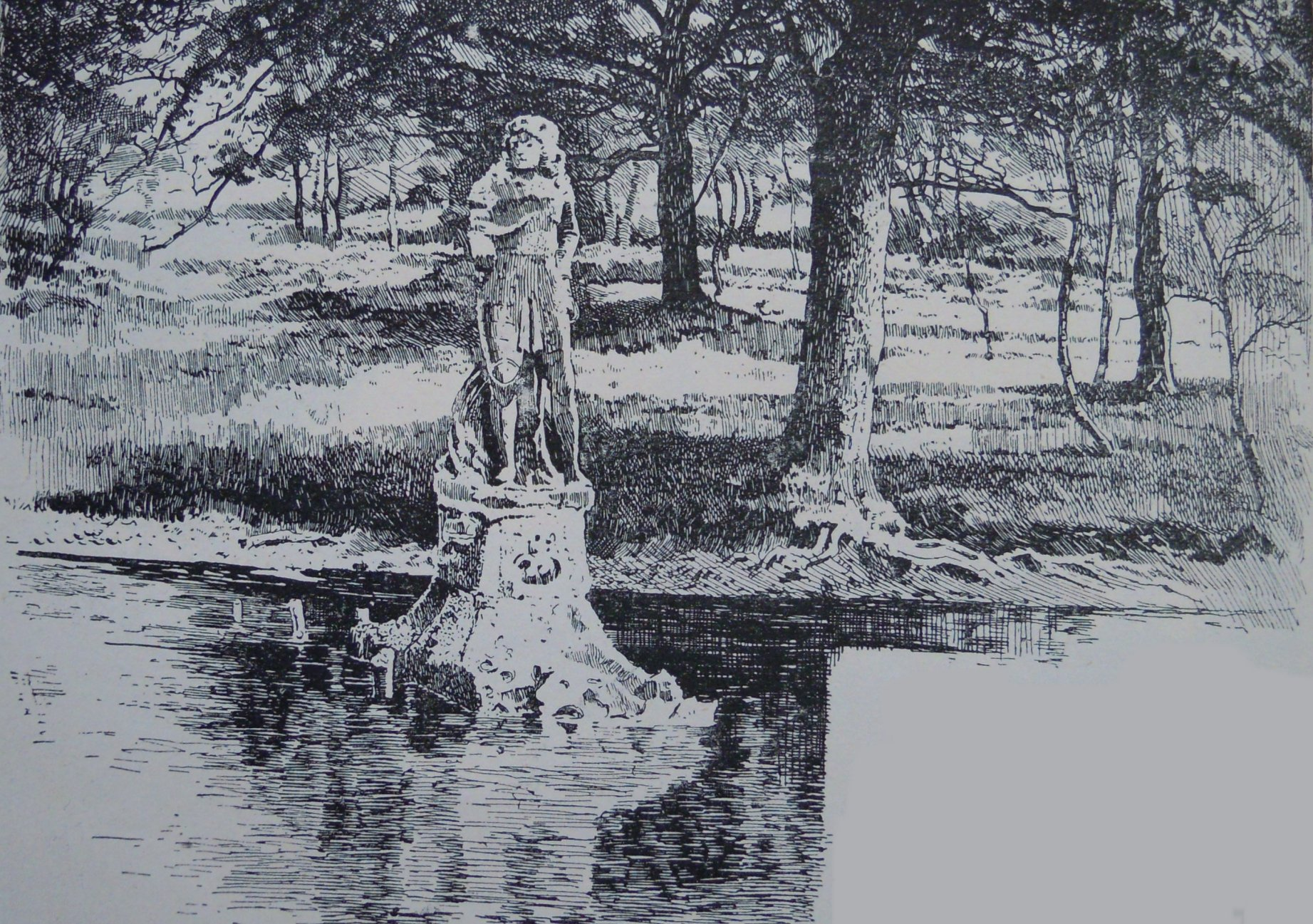
The statue of Charles II in the lake in 1891

A statue of Charles II was carved by Danish sculptor Caius Gabriel Cibber in 1681. By the early 19th century, the statue was described as being 'in a most wretched mutilated state; and the inscriptions on the base of the pedestal quite illegible'.

In 1875, the statue was removed during alterations in the square by T. Blackwell, of Crosse and Blackwell, the canned and bottled foodstuffs firm, who gave it for safekeeping to his friend, Goodall, with the intention that it might be restored. Goodall placed the statue on an island in his lake at Grim's Dyke, where it remained while Gilbert owned the property. In her will, Lady Gilbert directed that the statue be returned, and it was restored to Soho Square in 1938.

== Gilbert's lake and death ==
The lake, which is some way from the house, beyond the ornamental gardens, was considerably extended by Gilbert during his time at Grim's Dyke. Work on digging out the lake began in 1899, with Gilbert himself assisting in the task. Eventually it covered about one and a half acres, with an island in the middle, a punt house and changing hut, and an artificial waterfall that was ceremonially turned on in December 1899. The lake was drained and refilled each year, to keep the water clear, and was stocked with trout. In 1905 the lake was extended again to a roughly rectangular shape, measuring 170 yards by 50 yards. When Gilbert lived at Grim's Dyke he swam in the lake every day from March to September.

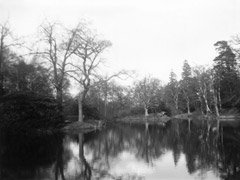
Gilbert's Lake in 1899

On 29 May 1911 Gilbert had arranged to give a swimming lesson in the lake to two local girls, Winifred Isabel Emery (1890–1972), a teacher and niece of the actors Cyril Maude and Winifred Emery, and her 17-year-old pupil Ruby Vivian Preece. The three arrived at the lake at about 4 pm that day. In 1923, Winifred Isabel Emery related to Gilbert's biographers her recollection of what happened on that day:

Sir William Gilbert was teaching me to swim, and he invited me and a pupil of mine [Ruby Preece] to Grim's Dyke on May 29th. We met him at Harrow Station and motored to Grim's Dyke and went straight to the bathing pool. My pupil and I were in the water before Sir William had made an appearance. It was a very hot day, but the water struck very cold. My pupil was a much better swimmer than I, and soon outdistanced me. We were both unaware that the lake was very deep further out, and presently she shrieked out "Oh, Miss Emery, I am drowning!" I called Sir William, who was on the steps, and he called out to her not to be frightened, and that he was coming. He swam out to her very quickly, and I heard him say: "Put your hands on my shoulder and don't struggle." This she did, but almost immediately she called out that he had sunk under her and had not come up. We both called to him, but got no answer. I tried to reach them, but got out of my depth and could do nothing but call for help. My pupil managed to struggle to the bank, and presently the gardener came and got out a boat, but it seemed a long time before they recovered the body.

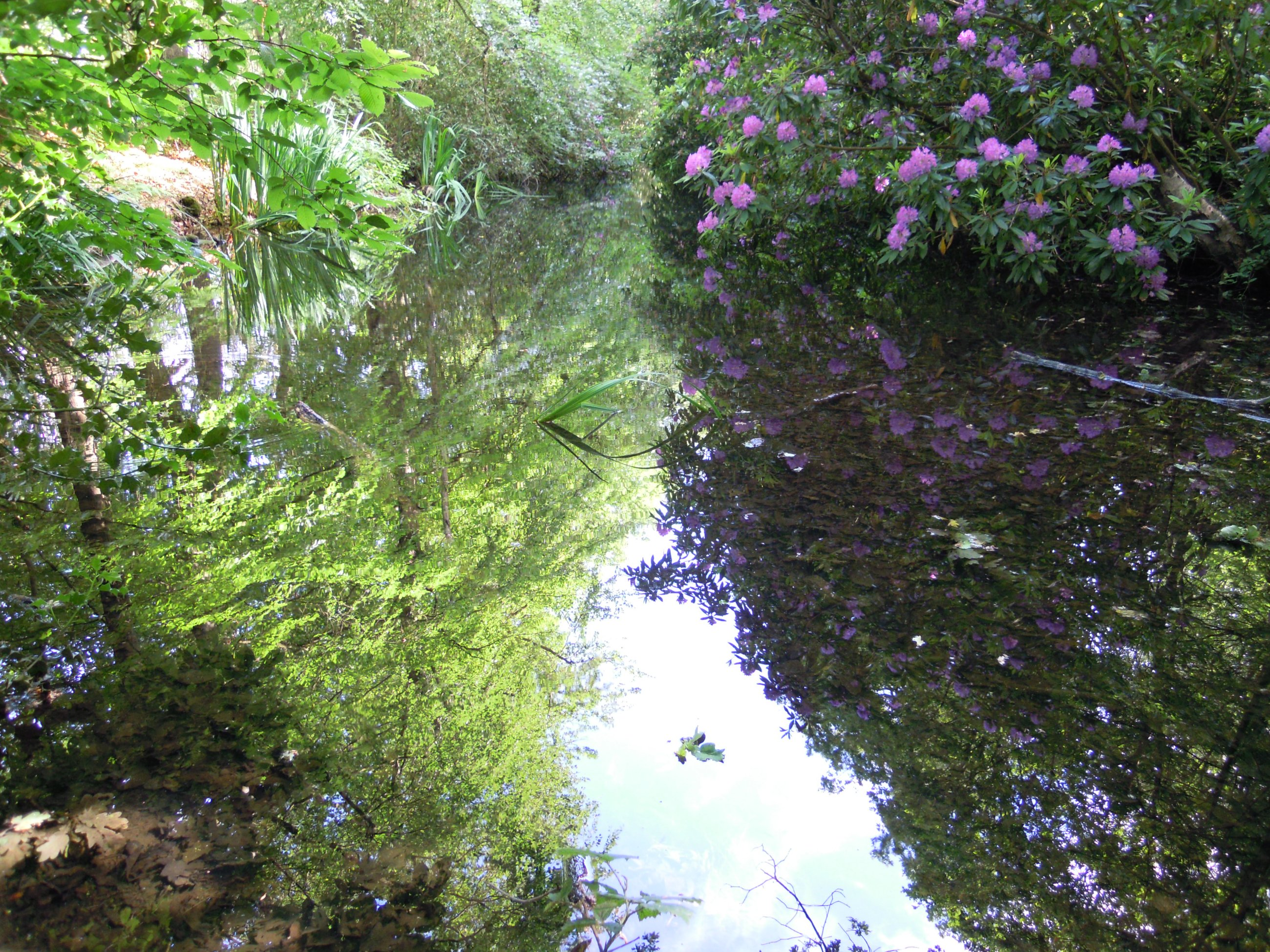
The lake, seen on 29 May 2011

At the coroner's inquest, Preece stated, "I found that I could not stand and called out and Sir William swam to me. I put my hand on his shoulder and I felt him suddenly sink. I thought he would come up again. My feet were on the mud then. Miss Emery called for help and the gardeners came with the boat." Gilbert had "died instantly of the heart attack". Once his body was recovered, it was laid out in the billiard room (now the hotel's restaurant) at Grim's Dyke. The family doctor, W.W. Shackleton, and Daniel Wilson of Bushey Heath Cottage Hospital, later certified that Gilbert had died at about 4.20 pm that afternoon of syncope (heart failure) brought on by excessive exertion. The coroner's jury, also meeting in the billiard room at Grim's Dyke two days later, on 31 May 1911, recorded a verdict of accidental death.

Shortly thereafter, Lady Gilbert had the lake closed off and largely drained. The incident is described in the documentary Metro-Land. Over the century since then, silt has built up in the mostly drained lake and trees and other vegetation have grown, dividing the lake into smaller ponds. In 2011, the rare Great Crested Newt was found living near these ponds.

== Film location ==
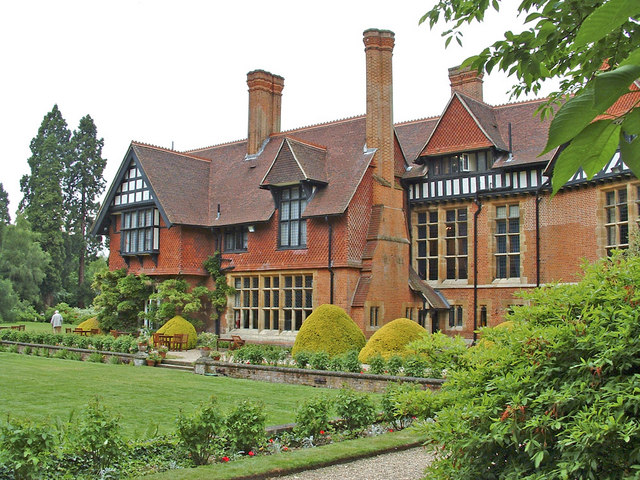
The house seen from the garden

The dramatic architecture of this Victorian country house, and its typically English interior, have made it attractive as a film and television location. The following television shows and films, among others, used Grim's Dyke as a location:

- The Avengers (1961) TV series; episodes include "Game"
- The Saint (1962) TV series; two episodes
- It Happened Here (1966)
- Doctor Who: The Evil of the Daleks (1967) TV series; episodes 3 and 4
- The Blood Beast Terror (1968)
- Curse of the Crimson Altar (1968)
- The Champions (1968) TV series
- The Prime of Miss Jean Brodie (1969)
- Randall and Hopkirk (Deceased) (1969) TV series; episode "You Can Always Find a Fall Guy"
- Zeta One (1969)
- Department S (1969) TV series; episodes include "Handicap Dead" (1969) and "The Bones of Byrom Blain" (1970)
- Futtock's End (1970)
- Cry of the Banshee (1970)
- The Adventurer (1972–73) TV series
- Spyder's Web (1972) TV series
- Endless Night (1972)
- Metro-Land (1973 documentary by John Betjeman)
- Sliding Doors (1998)
- EastEnders (2003) TV series
- Little Britain (2004) TV series
- Holby City TV series
- One Chance (2013)

== Gallery ==
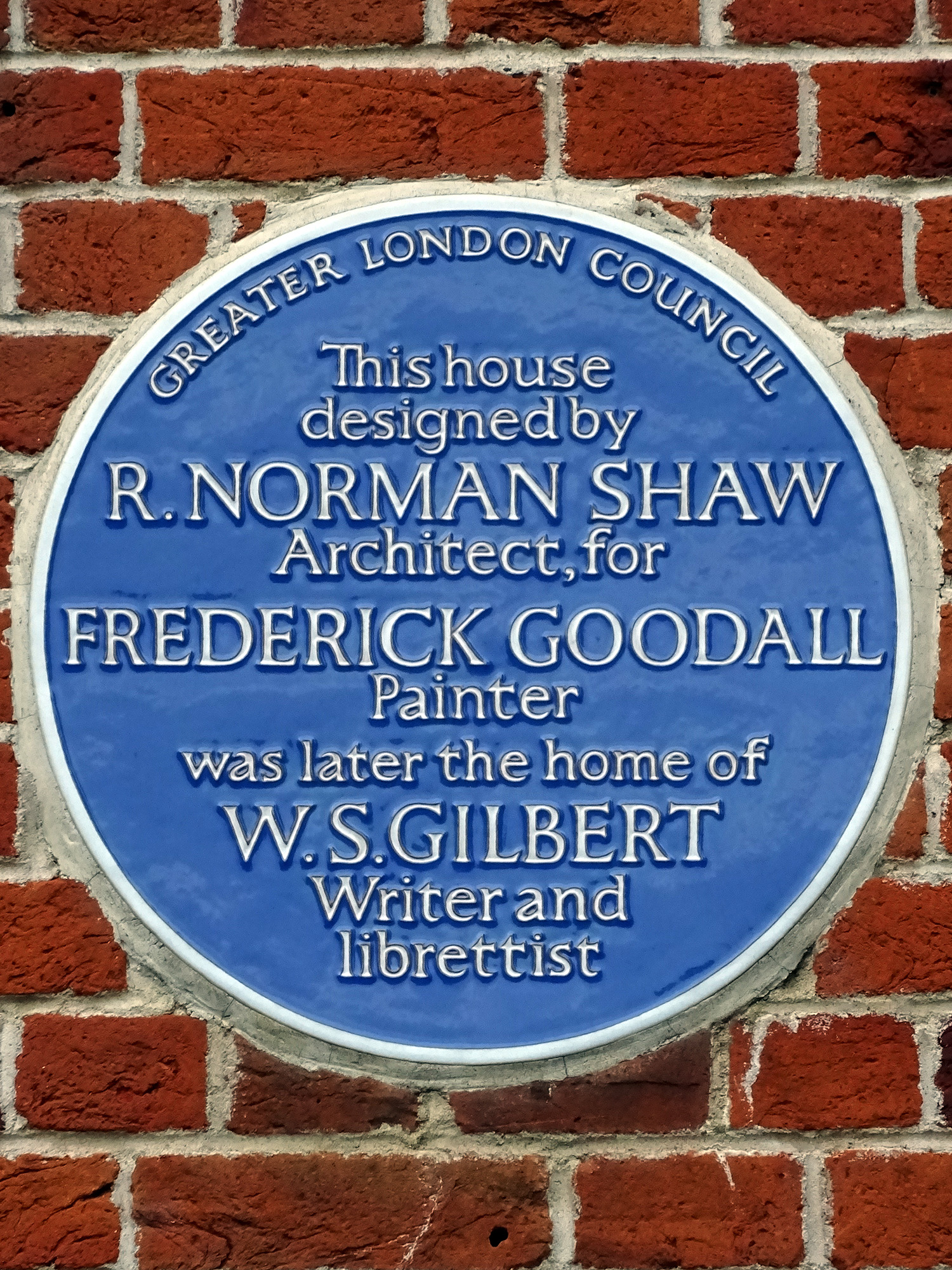
Blue plaque at Grim's Dyke

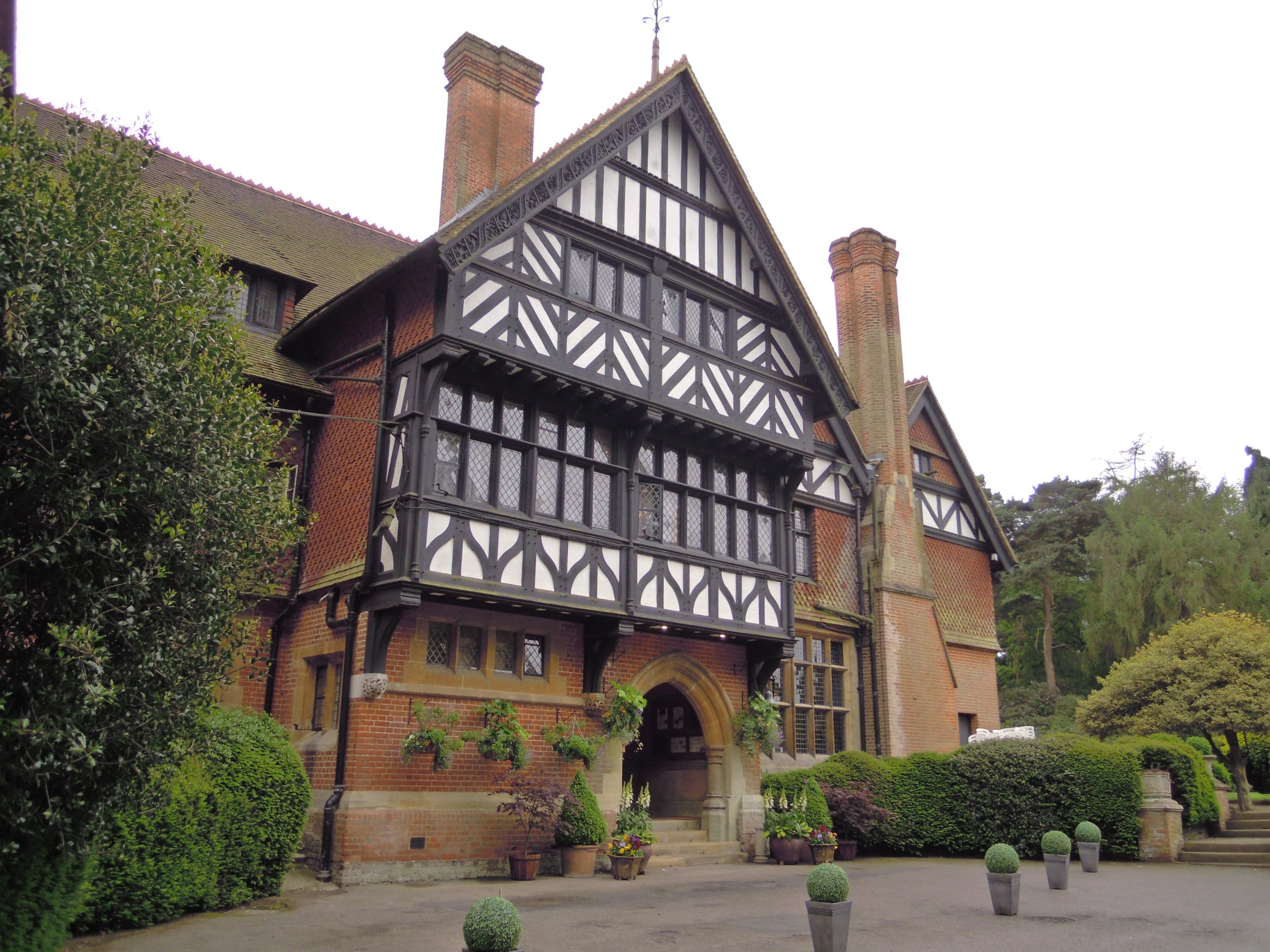
Another view of the main entrance

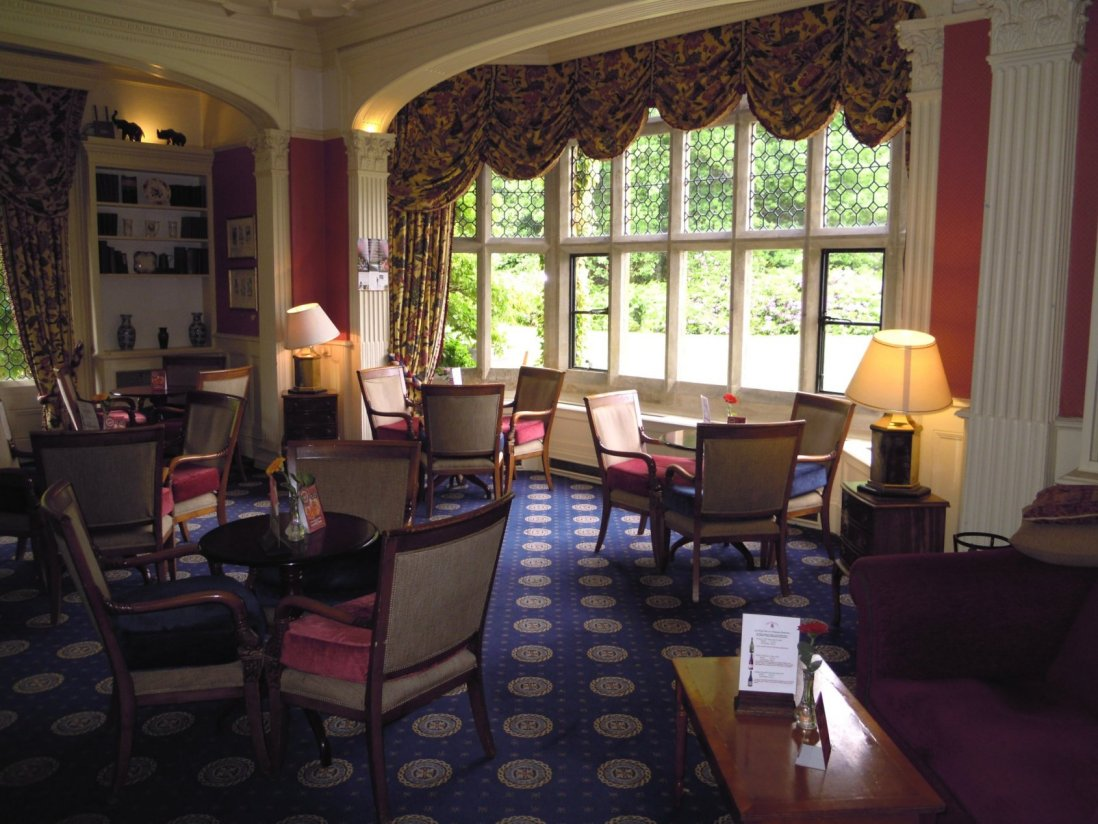
The Library Bar, formerly Gilbert's library

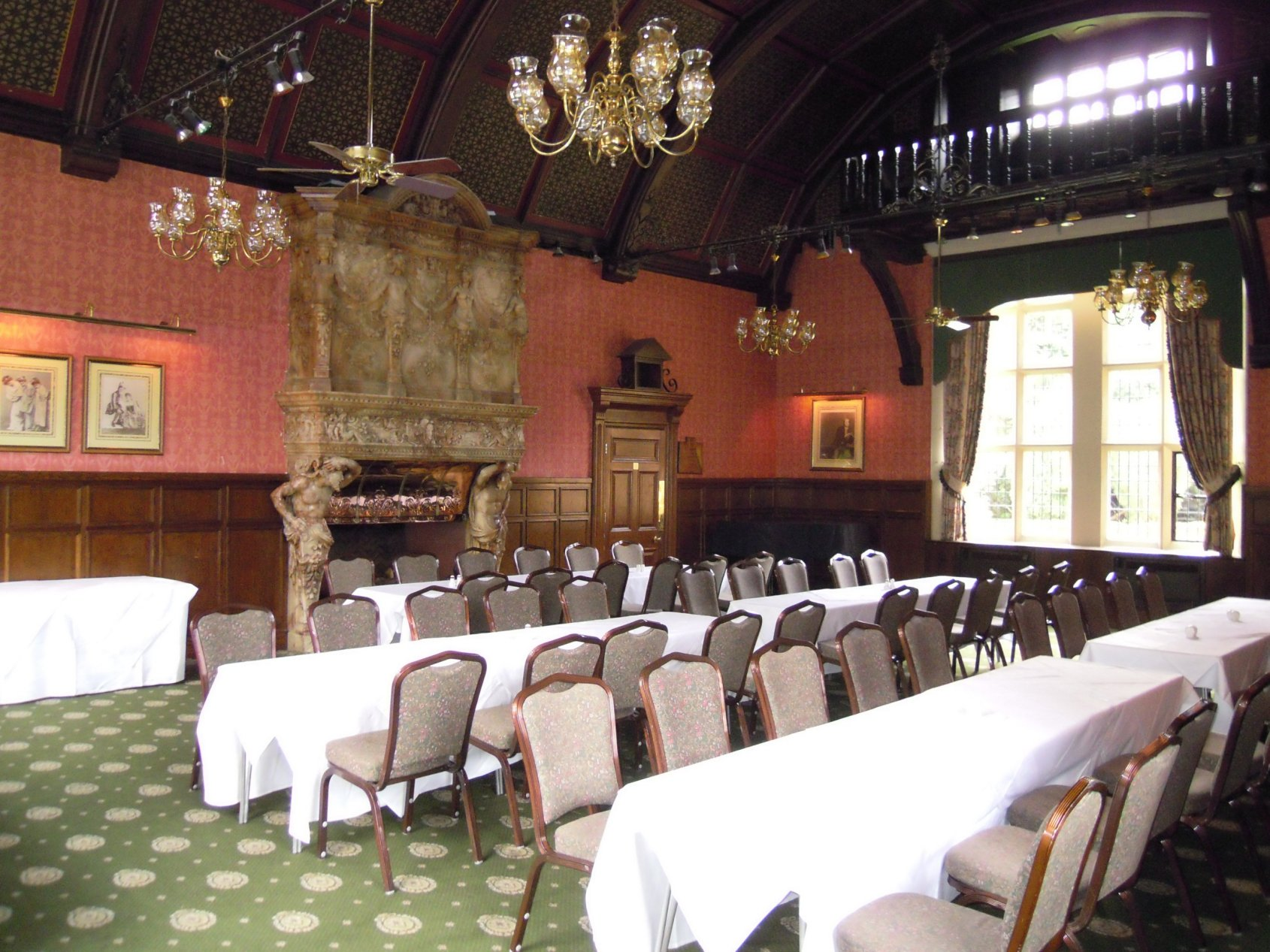
The Music Room

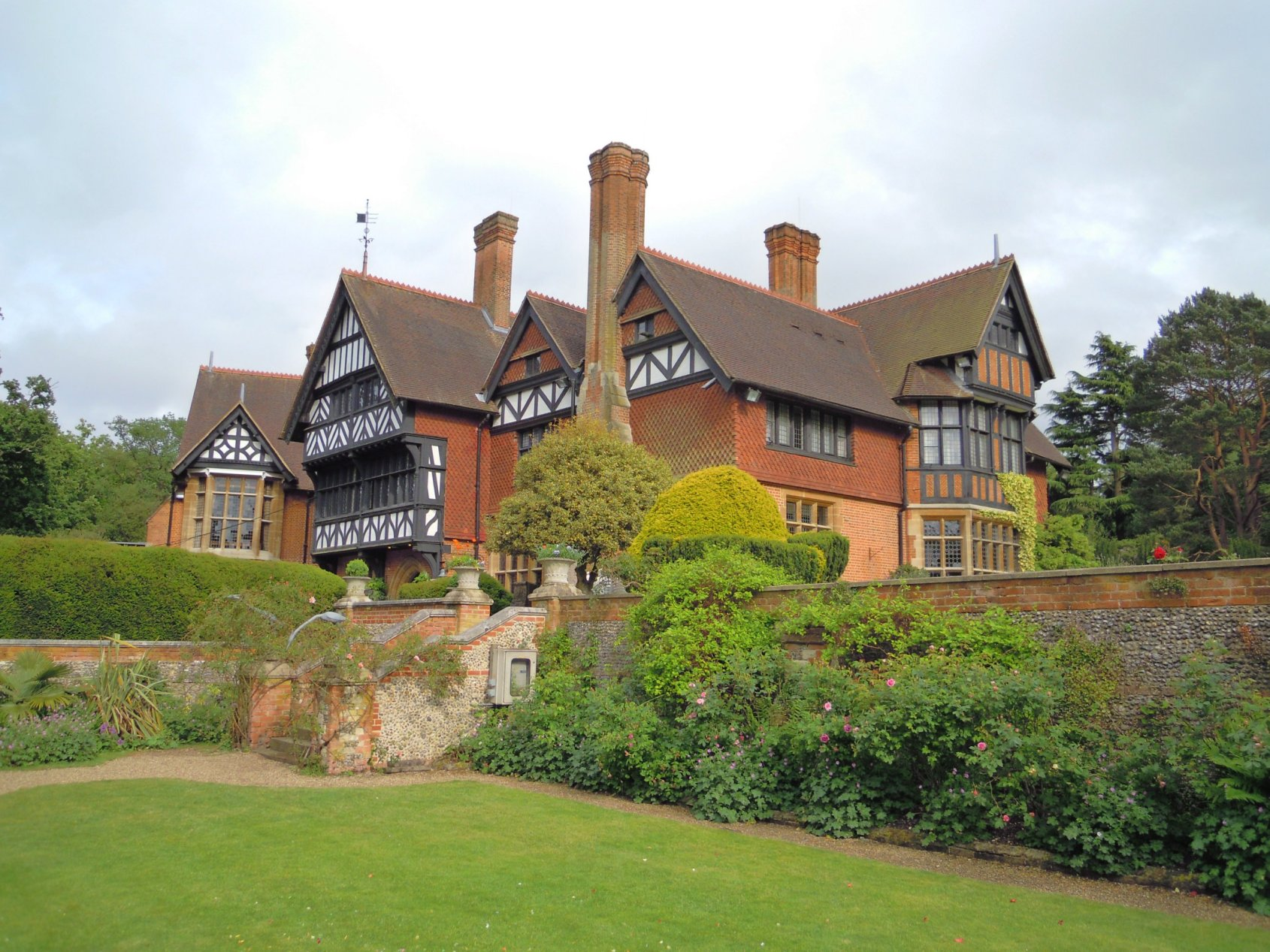
Grim's Dyke from the garden

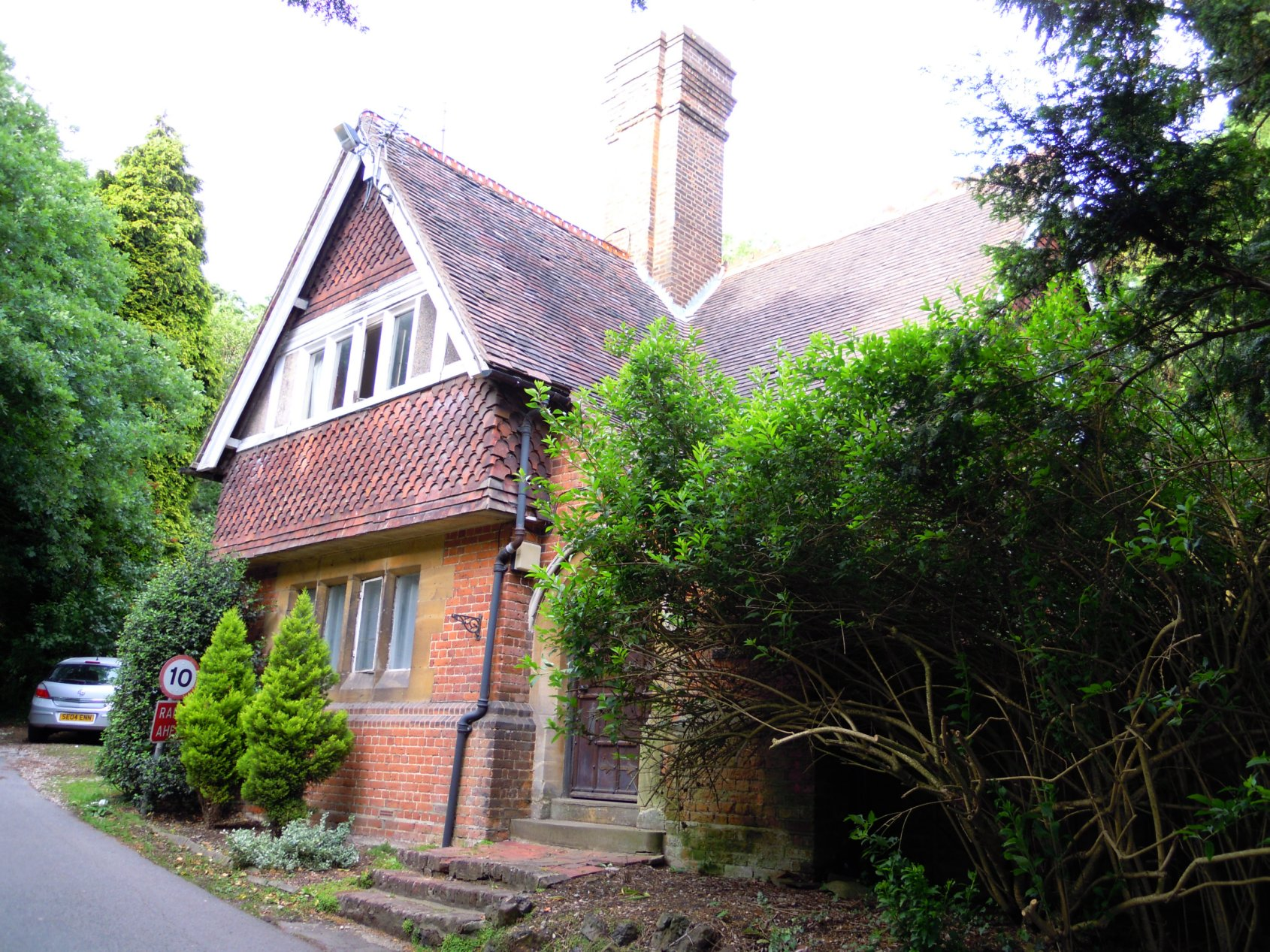
The Gatehouse

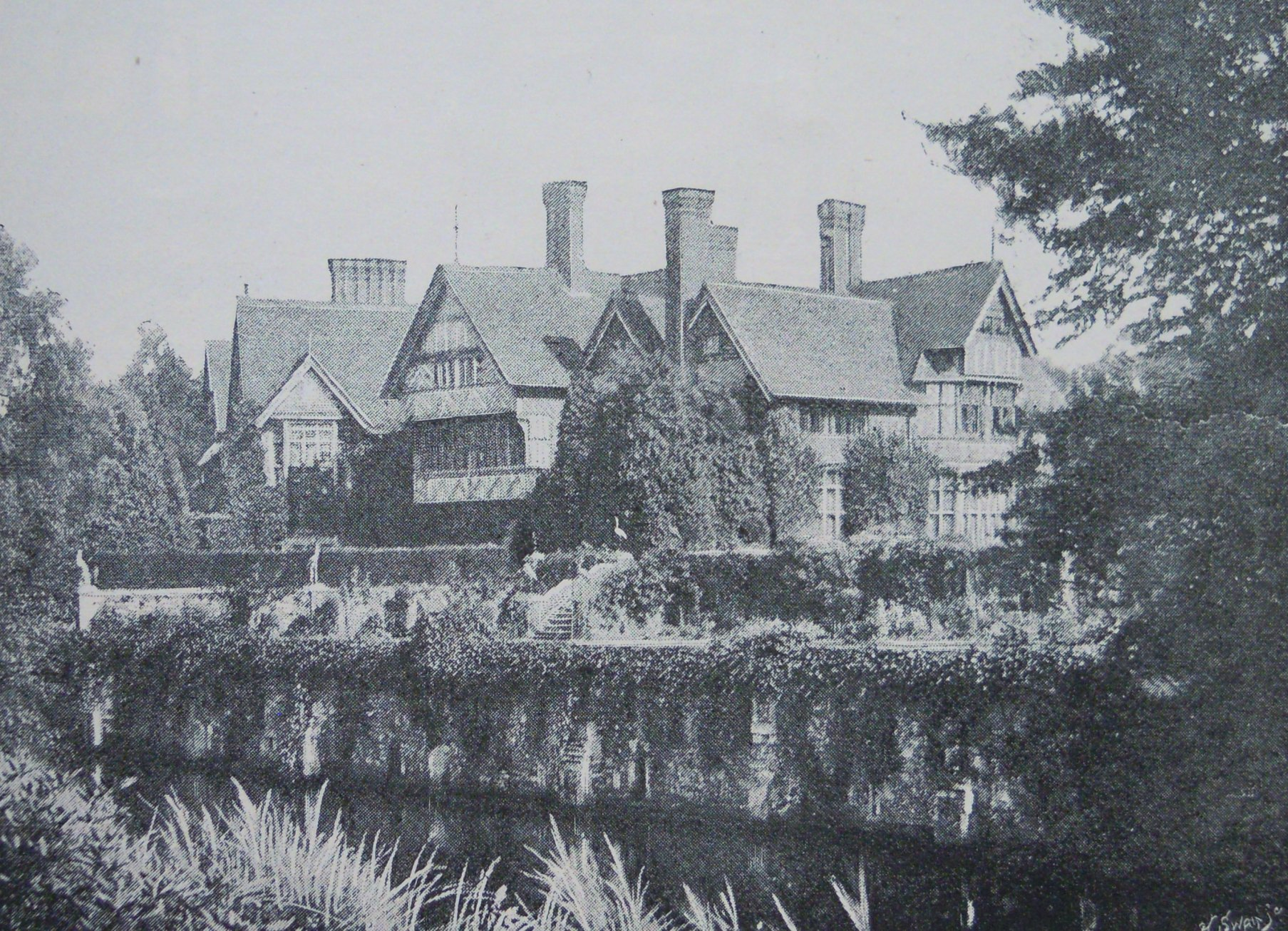
Grim's Dyke viewed from the dyke in 1891

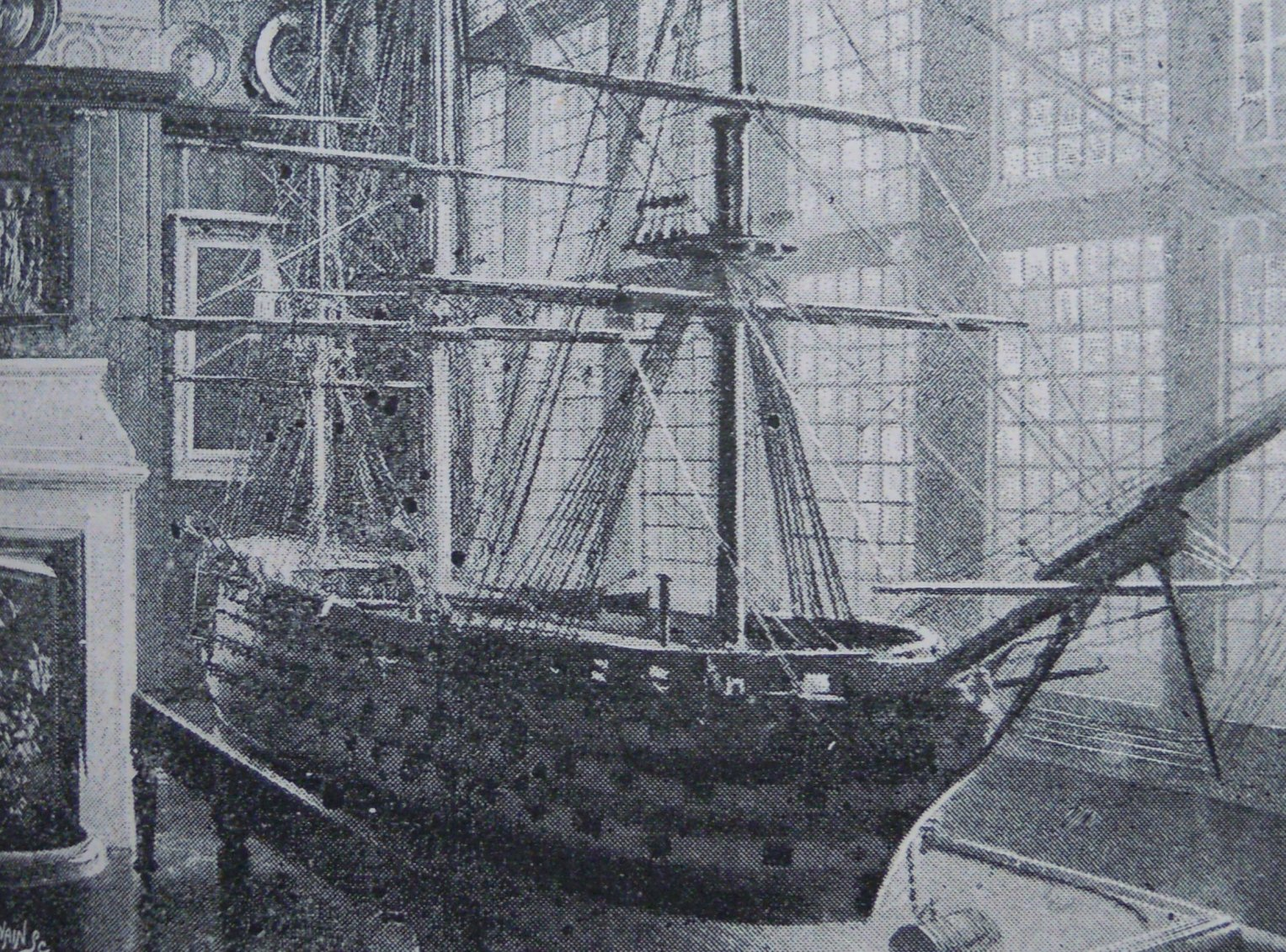
Gilbert's model of HMS Queen at Grim's Dyke

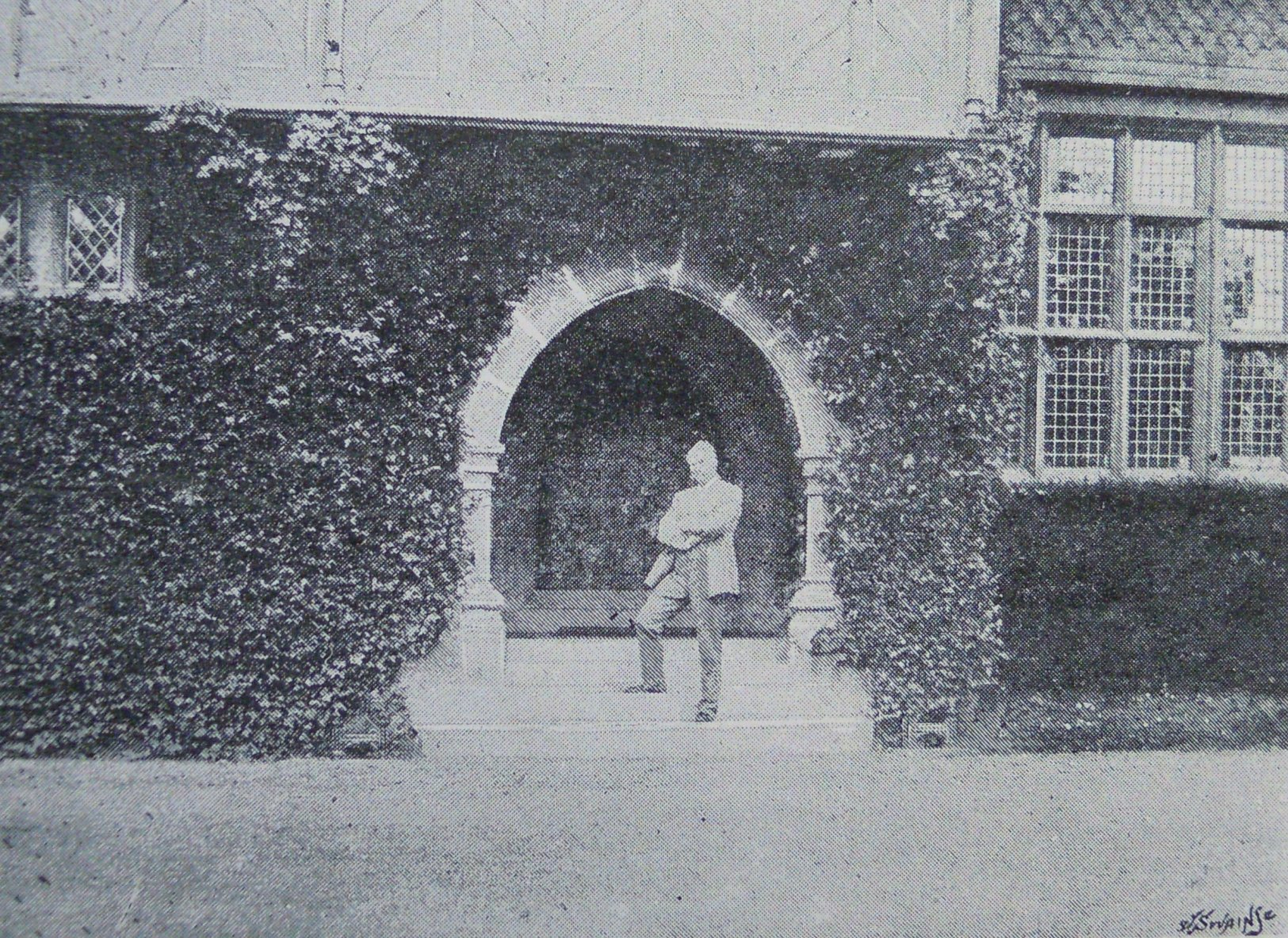
Gilbert in the porch

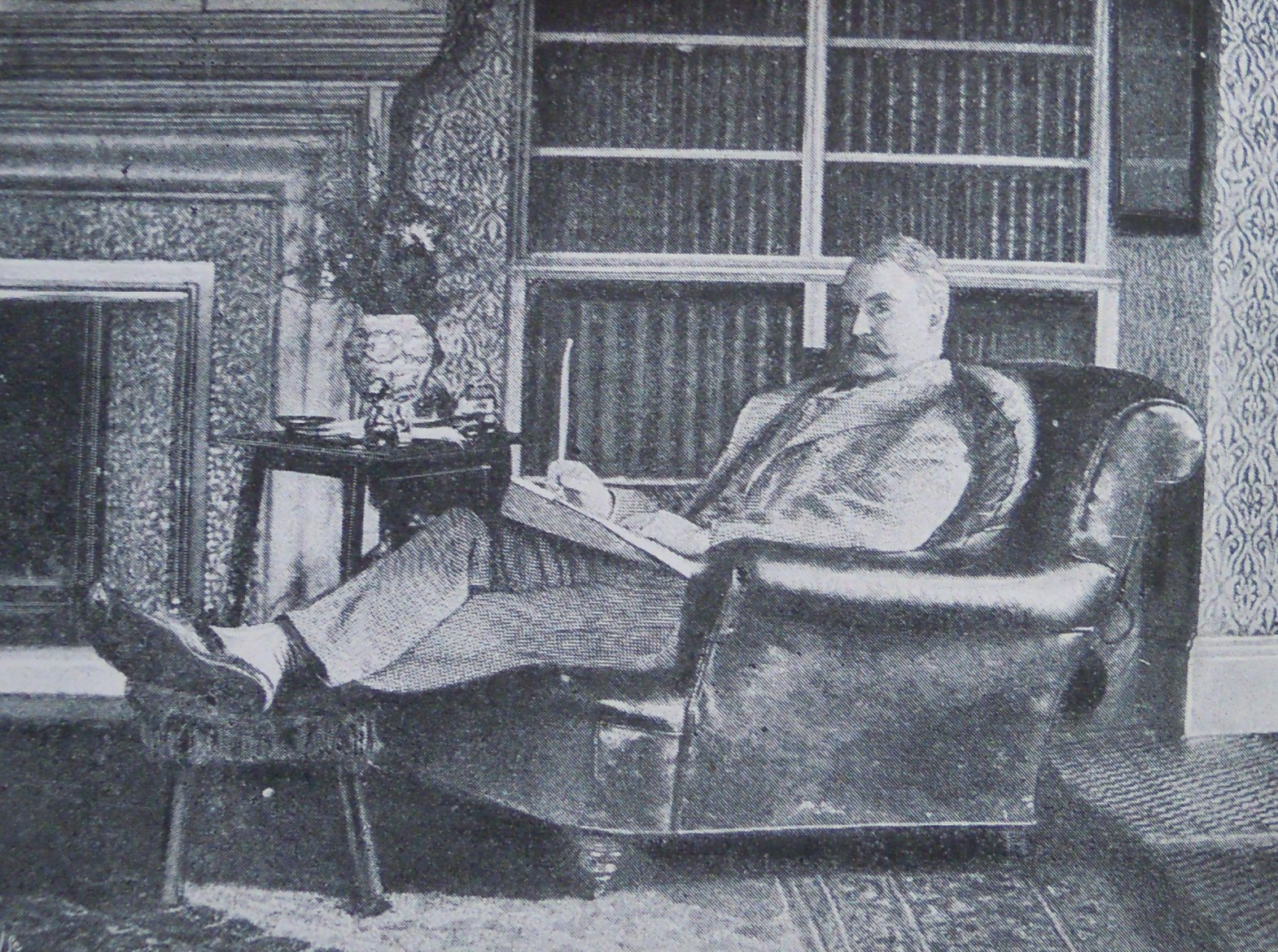
Gilbert at work in the library

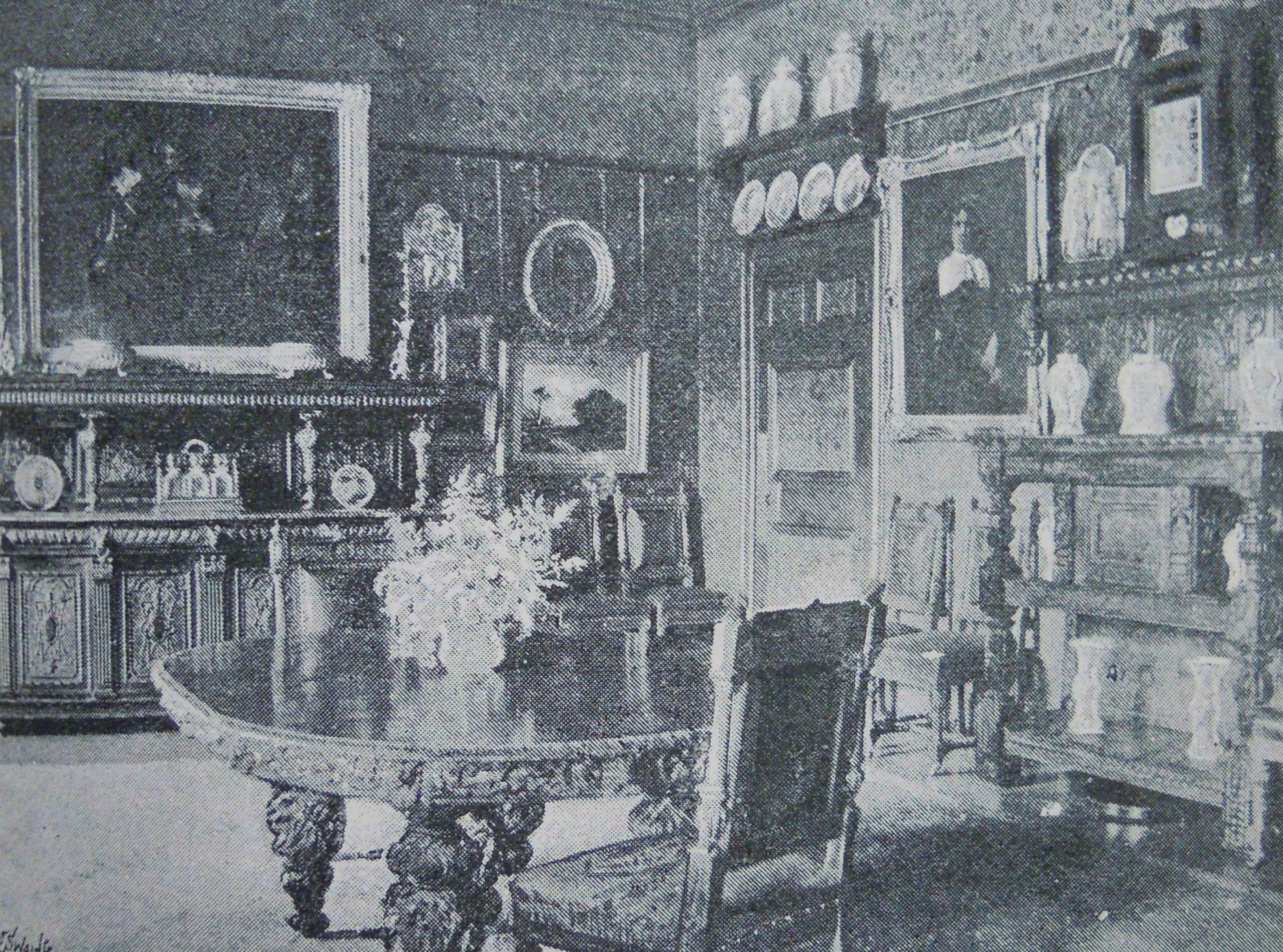
The dining room in 1891

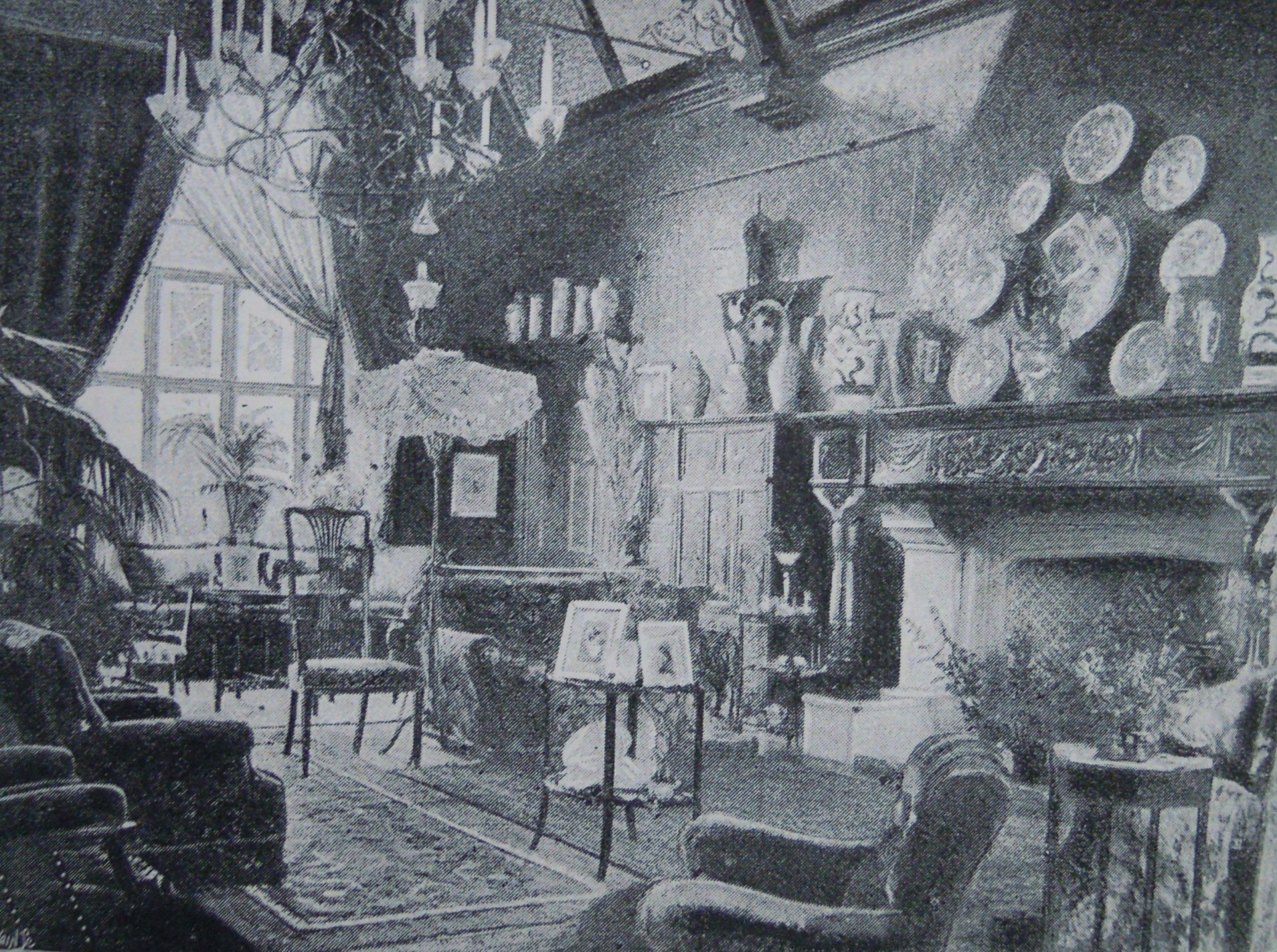
The drawing room in 1891

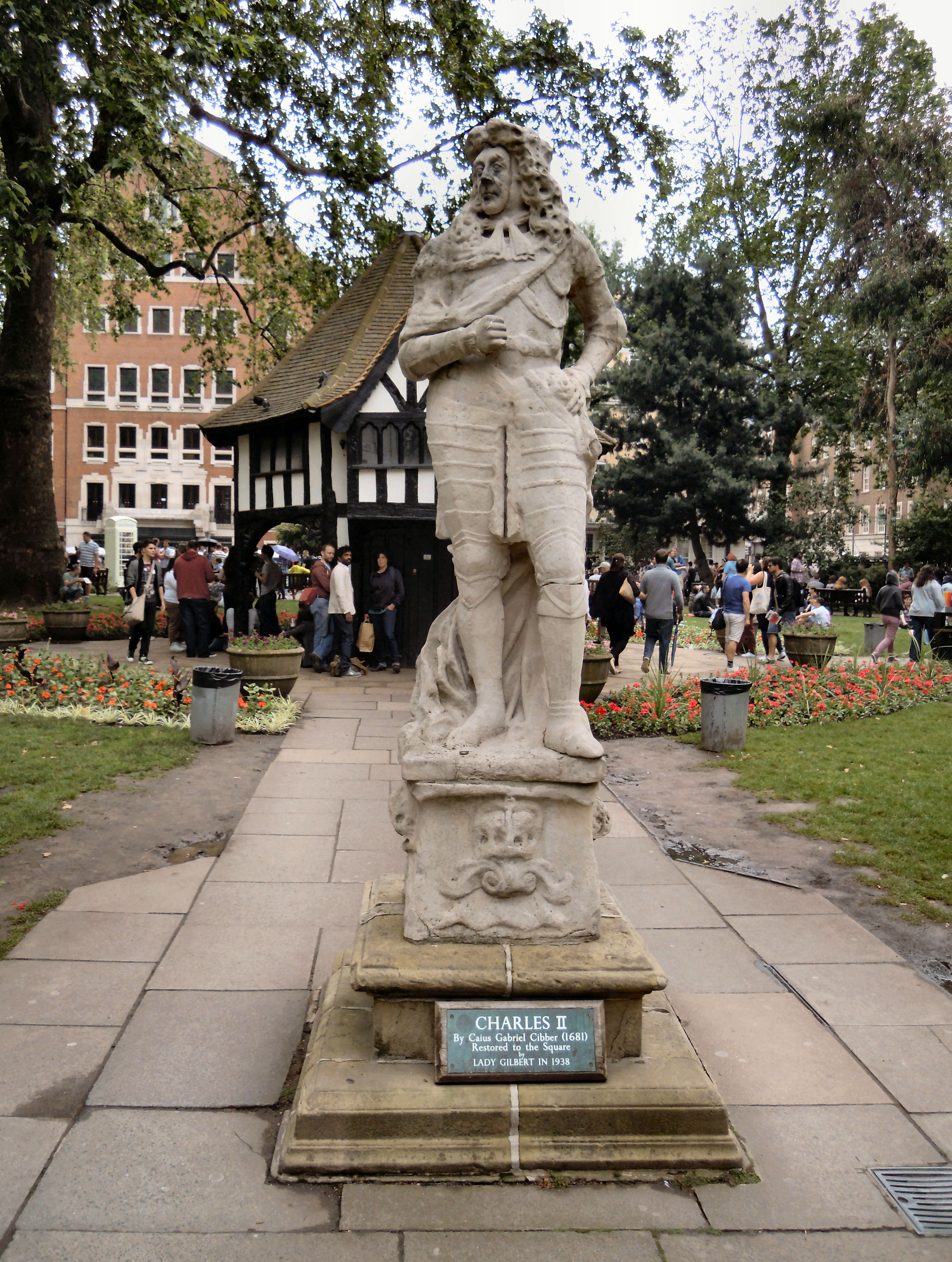
The statue of Charles II, now in Soho Square, London
