= Statue of Charles II, Soho Square =

Statue in London by Caius Gabriel Cibber

Coordinates: 51.515372°N 0.132264°W

Charles II
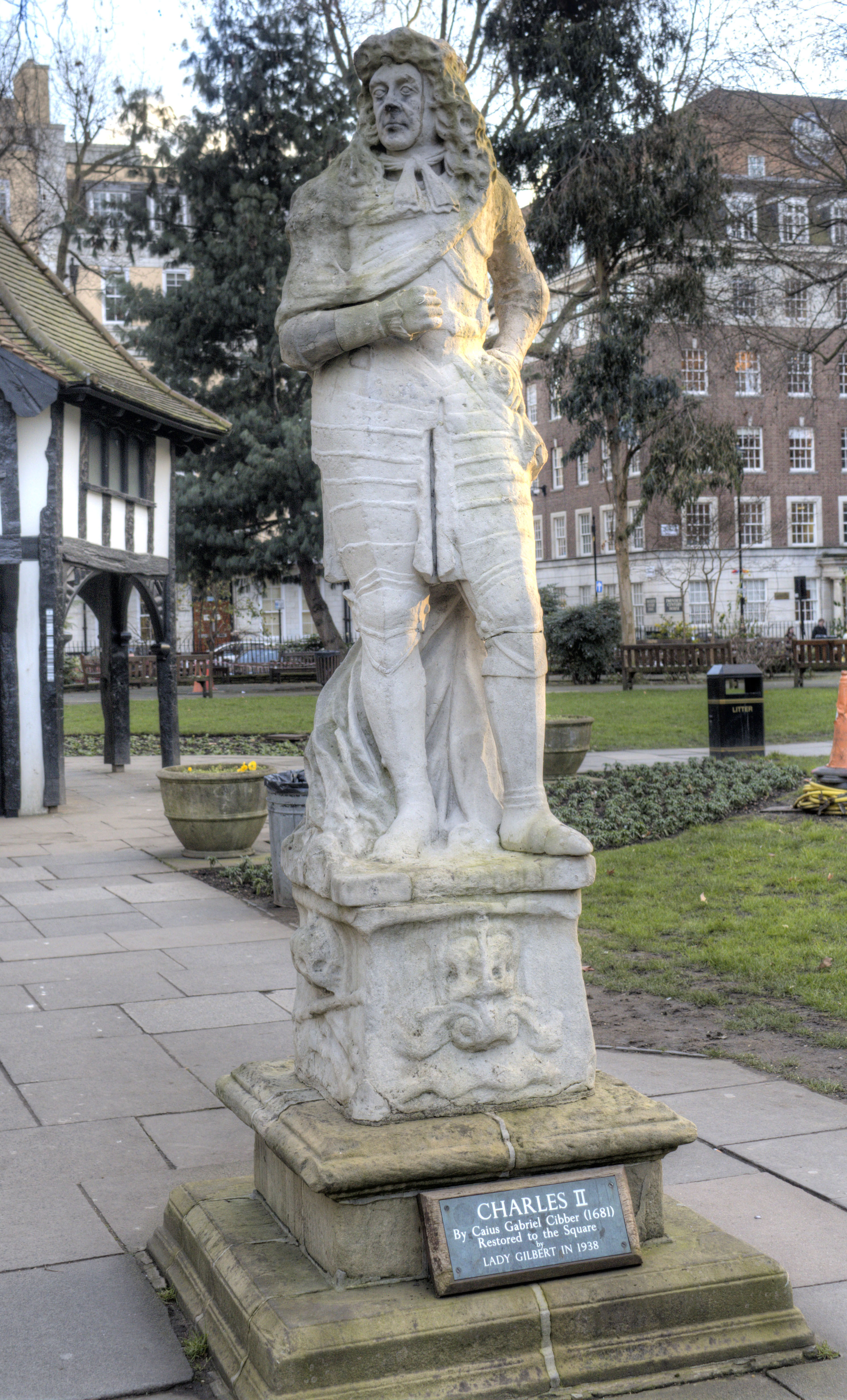
- The statue in 2015
- Artist: Caius Gabriel Cibber
- Year: c. 1680–1
- Dimensions: 195 cm (77 in)
- Location: Soho Square; London, W1 United Kingdom

The statue of Charles II is an outdoor sculpture of Charles II of England by the Danish sculptor Caius Gabriel Cibber, located near the centre of Soho Square in London. Once part of a late 17th century fountain, it was removed in the late 19th century to a private estate in Harrow before being restored to the square in the mid-20th century. It depicts the king in a standing pose on top of a low decorated pedestal. Although it has been the subject of restoration works, it is heavily eroded and in a poor condition.

== History ==
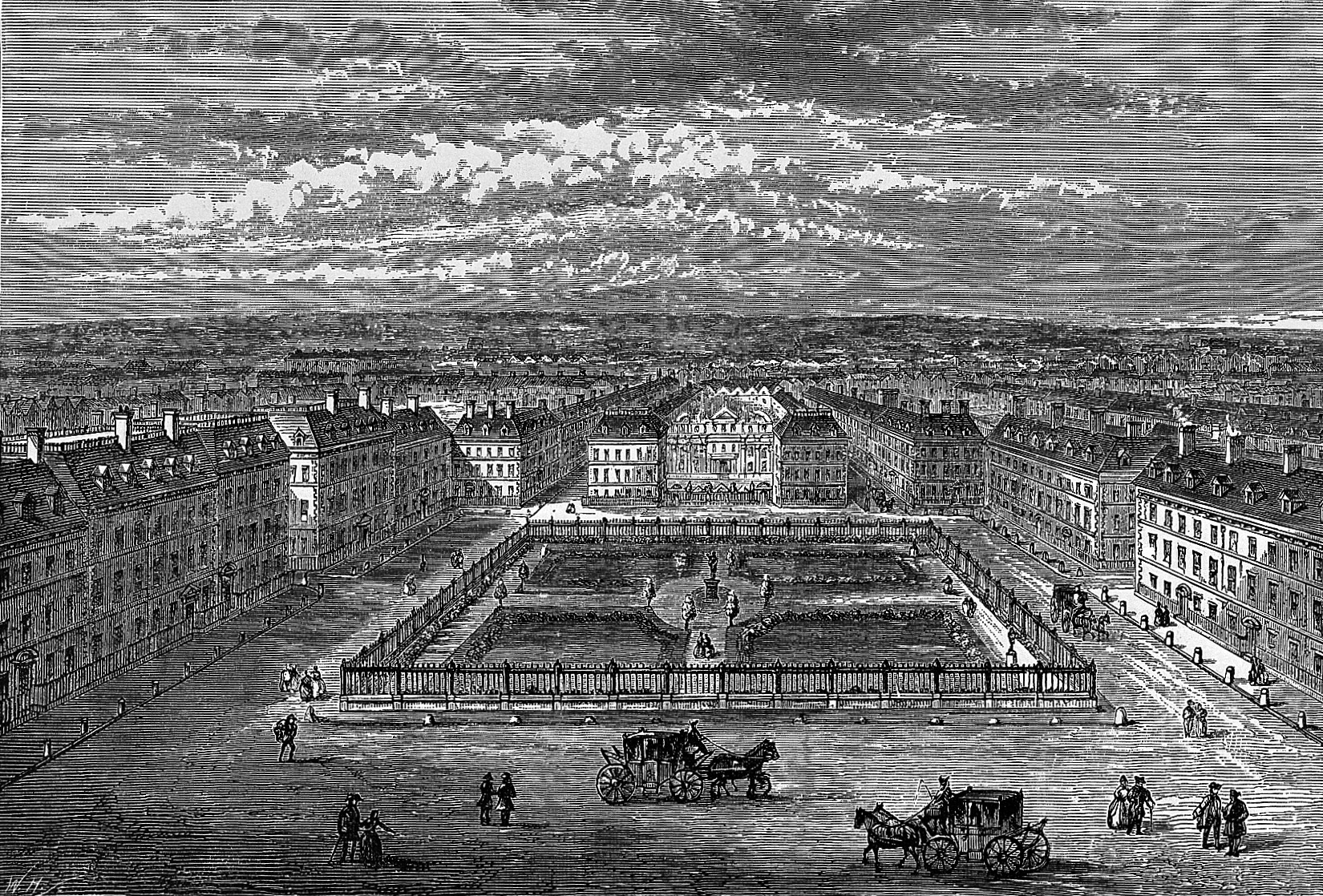
The statue at the centre of Soho Square, c. 1700

Soho Square was laid out in the 1670s, during the reign of Charles II, and was originally called King Square in his honour. Its layout was influenced by European baroque ideas and specifically by the French tradition of a formal place royale. At its centre was a formal garden, in the middle of which stood a fountain in a basin that was installed in 1681. The fountain was a modest imitation of Bernini's famous Fontana dei Quattro Fiumi in Rome, which Caius Cibber probably saw during his visit to the city to study sculpture in the 1660s. Each corner had statues of river gods representing the Thames, Severn, Humber and Tyne, while the statue of Charles II occupied the central position above the four divinities.

The statue's original base was reportedly much more elaborate than the truncated portion visible today. Edward Walford wrote that "on the south side were figures of an old man and a young virgin, with a stream ascending; on the west lay the figure of a naked virgin (only nets wrapped about her) reposing on a fish, out of whose mouth flowed a stream of water; on the north, an old man recumbent on a coal-bed, and an urn in his hand whence issues a stream of water; on the east rested a very aged man, with water running from a vase, and his right hand laid upon a shell." The fountain's water, which was pumped by a windmill in nearby Rathbone Place, flowed from jugs into a large basin. Several other works by Cibber are said to have stood in the square.

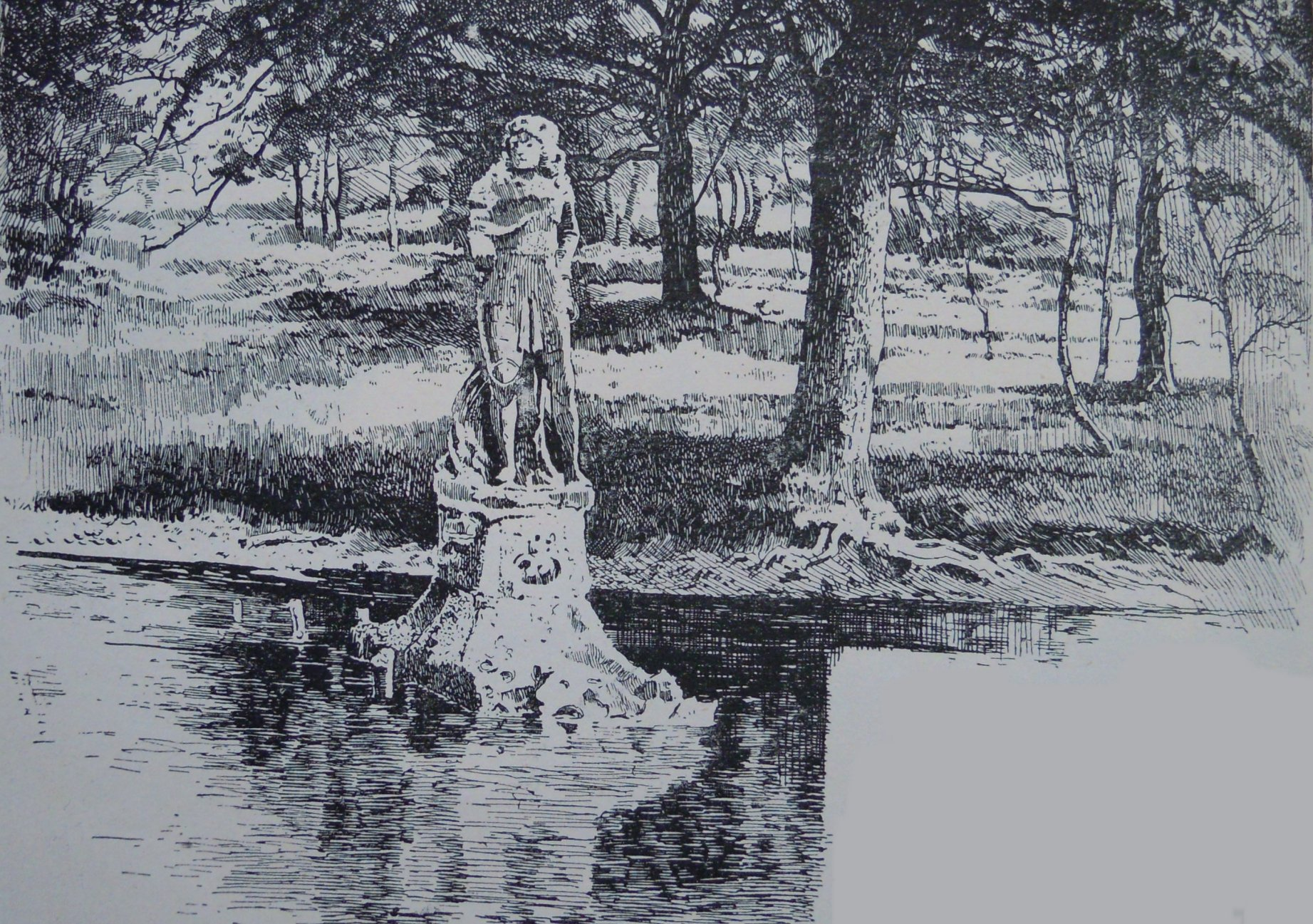
Print of the statue in the lake at Grim's Dyke, 1891

By the early 19th century, the statue was described as being "in a most wretched and mutilated state; and the inscriptions on the base of the pedestal quite illegible". The basin was filled in and "converted into a somewhat unattractive flower-bed". In 1875–6 the square underwent substantial changes to its layout, during which the badly deteriorated statue was removed and the fountain demolished. The statue was rescued by Thomas Blackwell of the condiment firm Crosse & Blackwell, who had offices in the square. He gave it to his friend, the artist Frederick Goodall, with the intention that it might be restored. The present half-timbered gardener's shed took the statue's place at the centre of the square. Goodall installed the statue on an island in a lake at Grim's Dyke, his house near Harrow Weald; he wrote that "in the twilight it looks very mysterious and weird with its reflection in the water."

It remained there when the dramatist W. S. Gilbert purchased the property in 1890, and there it stayed after his death in 1911, despite a request from Crosse & Blackwell for the statue's return, which Gilbert apparently ignored. Gilbert's widow agreed to bequeath the statue to the committee responsible for the square's upkeep and following her death it was moved back to the square in 1938. It now stands a short distance north of its original site.

== Description ==
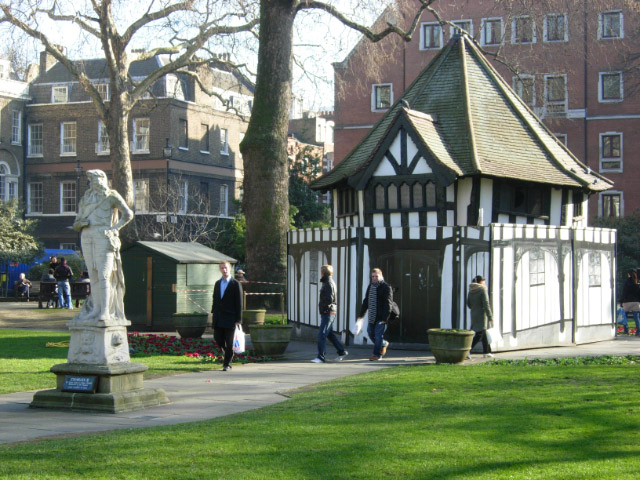
The statue in Soho Square in 2008

The statue portrays Charles in a standing pose, left hand on hip, with his head turned to the right and wearing a long wig. He is shown wearing some body and thigh armour and a heavy long cloak at the back, and formerly held a baton in his right hand. The low pedestal once had an inscription on it, but this became illegible as long ago as 1815, leading to some dispute at that time about whom the statue was meant to represent. As the square was once called Monmouth Square, some people erroneously supposed the statue to represent Charles' favoured out-of-wedlock son, the Duke of Monmouth. By the 1920s it was described as "black with age". The pedestal's decorative carvings comprise a crown in relief surmounting scroll motifs on the front and rear, with each side depicting a crown surmounting crossed sceptres and a decorative riband.

Both the statue and pedestal are in poor condition and are seriously eroded, especially around the face and right arm. The baton once held in the right hand has disappeared. The original face has been replaced with a mask-like substitute that has been cemented on (possibly during restoration work in the 1930s), the left arm and leg are both broken, and some time before 1987 the entire statue was covered in a concrete wash which has now either been removed or worn away by the elements.

== Cultural references ==
The statue is used as a major plot device/character in Patrick Marber's 2017 production of Don Juan in Soho starring David Tennant.
