= 13 Soho Square =

Building in Soho Square, Westminster

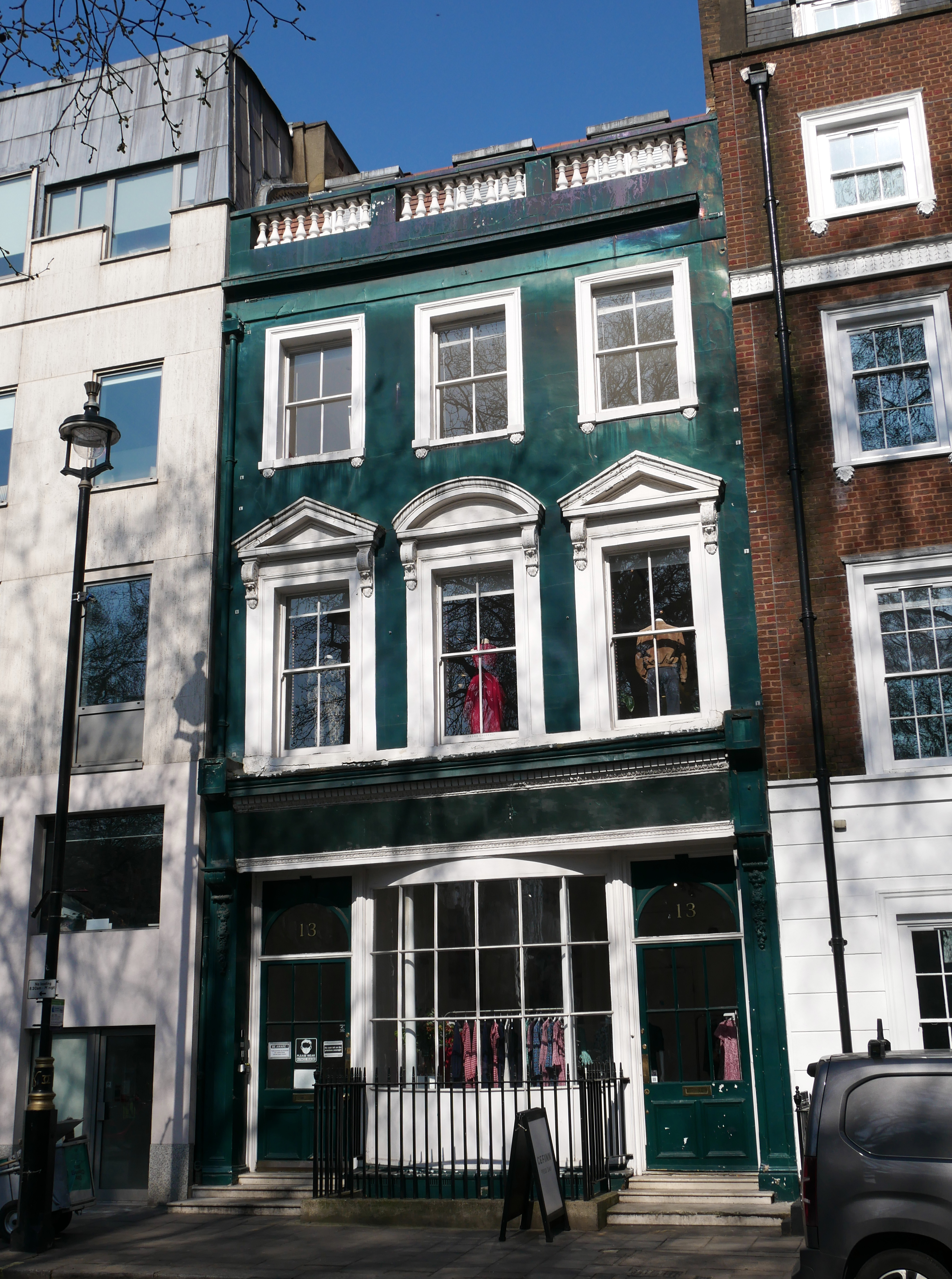
- 13 Soho Square in 2022
- Interactive map of the 13 Soho Square area

General information
- Type: townhouse
- Architectural style: Georgian
- Location: Soho Square, London, England
- Coordinates: 51°30′57″N 0°07′56″W
- Construction started: 1768-9

Technical details
- Structural system: Timber frame, brick

13 Soho Square is a Grade II* listed building in Soho Square, Westminster. It was built between 1768 and 1769, with earlier woodwork around 1677. The building was home to a number of notable residents, including the merchant and Whig politician Sir Isaac Rebow, the Jacobite George Mackenzie, 3rd Earl of Cromartie, and the physician George Leman Tuthill. In the 1970s and 80s 13 Soho Square was the home of Richard Williams Animation, where a number of award-winning films were made, including the short film A Christmas Carol, which won the Academy Award for Best Animated Short in 1972.

== History ==
13 Soho Square was built between 1768 and 1769, with earlier woodwork around 1677. It is a three-storey building, stucco faced, with a slate roof and a mansard attic.

The merchant and Whig politician Sir Isaac Rebow lived at No 13 Soho Square from 1696 until at least 1703. Other notable inhabitants include the Jacobite George Mackenzie, 3rd Earl of Cromartie who lived there from 1716 to 1760. Mackenzie joined the Jacobite rising of 1745 and was taken prisoner in Sutherland after the Battle of Littleferry. The physician George Leman Tuthill gave public lectures at 13 Soho Square from 1811 to 1821.

The building was the home of Richard Williams Animation during the 1970s and 1980s, where a number of award-winning films were made, including the Academy Award-winning short film A Christmas Carol, which won the Academy Award for Best Animated Short in 1972. In 1973 Williams closed down the studio and brought Hollywood animation veterans Art Babbitt, Grim Natwick and Ken Harris to train a new generation of young animators at 13 Soho Square.

13 Soho Square was listed Grade II* in 1978. Surviving period features worthy of note include a stone staircase in the interior dating to 1768–69 with a wrought iron balustrade.

== See also ==
- History of London
