= Gaio =

Gaio is an Italian given name and surname, related to the Latin name Gaius. Notable people with the name include:

- Federico Gaio (born 1992), Italian tennis player
- Gaio Chiocchio (1954–1996), Italian musician
