= Caio =

Caio may refer to:

- Caio (name), a Portuguese given name derived from the Latin given name Gaius
- Caio, Carmarthenshire, a village in west Wales
- Caio (moth), a genus
- Chief AI officer, a senior executive position responsible for overseeing artificial intelligence strategies
- Italian destroyer Caio Duilio, a destroyer of the Italian Navy

== Automotive ==
- Caio Induscar (Brazil)

== See also ==
- Caius (disambiguation)
- Gaius
