= Caio Pizzoli =

Brazilian ten-pin bowler

Personal information
- Nationality: Brazilian

Sport
- Sport: Ten pin bowling

Caio Pizzoli is a Brazilian ten-pin bowler. He finished 21st in the combined rankings at the 2006 AMF World Cup.
