= Gaius =

Gaius, sometimes spelled Caius, was a common Latin praenomen; see Gaius (praenomen).

== People ==
- Gaius (biblical figure) (1st century AD)
- Gaius (jurist) (fl. 130–180), Roman jurist
- Gaius Acilius
- Gaius Antonius
- Gaius Antonius Hybrida
- Gaius Asinius Gallus
- Gaius Asinius Pollio
- Gaius Ateius Capito
- Gaius Aurelius Cotta
- Gaius Calpurnius Piso
- Gaius Carter, American archer
- Gaius Canuleius, a tribune
- Gaius Cassius Longinus
- Gaius Charles, American actor
- Gaius Claudius Glaber, Roman military commander during the Third Servile War
- Gaius Claudius Marcellus Maior, consul in 49 BC
- Gaius Claudius Marcellus Minor (88–40 BC), consul in 50 BC
- Gaius Clodius Crispinus, Roman politician and senator in 2nd century AD
- Gaius Cornelius Tacitus, Roman orator famous for the annals and histories
- Gaius Duilius
- Gaius Fabricius Luscinus
- Gaius Flaminius
- Gaius Flavius Fimbria
- Gaius Gracchus
- Gaius Julius Alpinus Classicianus
- Gaius Julius Antiochus Epiphanes Philopappos, consul and Syrian prince
- Gaius Julius Caesar, mostly known as only "Julius Caesar"
- Gaius Julius Caesar Augustus Germanicus, sometimes known solely by his praenomen ("the Emperor Gaius"), mostly known by his nickname "Caligula"
- Gaius Julius Caesar Octavianus, mostly known as "Augustus Caesar"
- Gaius Julius Caesar Strabo
- Gaius Caesar (or Gaius Vipsanius Agrippa)
- Gaius Julius Callistus
- Gaius Julius Civilis
- Gaius Julius Hyginus
- Gaius Julius Marcus
- Gaius Julius Priscus
- Gaius Julius Solinus
- Gaius Julius Vindex, governor of Lusitania
- Gaius Laelius
- Gaius Licinius Stolo
- Gaius Livius Drusus
- Gaius Lucilius
- Gaius Lutatius Catulus
- Gaius Maecenas
- Gaius Maesius Tertius
- Gaius Marcius Coriolanus
- Gaius Marcius Rutilus
- Gaius Marius
- Gaius Matius
- Gaius Memmius (disambiguation)
- Gaius Nautius Rutilus
- Gaius Octavius (disambiguation)
- Gaius Oppius
- Gaius Papirius Carbo, a consul of 120 BC
- Gaius Papirius Carbo Arvina, a tribune of 90 BC
- Gaius Plinius Secundus, wrote an encyclopedic work that became a model for all encyclopedias
- Gaius Popillius Laenas
- Gaius Rabirius
- Gaius Rubellius Blandus
- Gaius Sallustius Crispus Passienus
- Gaius Servilius Ahala
- Gaius Servilius Glaucia
- Gaius Suetonius Paulinus
- Gaius the Platonist a philosopher active in the 2nd century
- Gaius Valerius Catullus
- Gaius Valerius Flaccus
- Gaius Valerius Pudens
- Gaius Volusenus

== Fictional characters ==
- Gaius Octavian (Rome character), Rome
- Gaius Helen Mohiam, Dune
- Gaius Baltar, Battlestar Galactica
- Gaius Sextus, Gaius Septimus, and Gaius Octavian aka Tavi, characters from Codex Alera
- Gaius, a teacher, Doctor, herbalist, and character from Merlin
- Gaius Maro from The Elder Scrolls V: Skyrim
- Gaius, a thief unit from Fire Emblem Awakening
- Commander Gaius, a character from Elden Ring
- General Gaius, a character from Dust: An Elysian Tail
- Gaius Van Baelsar, a main antagonist of Final Fantasy XIV: A Realm Reborn
- King Gaius, a character from Tales of Xillia
- Gaius, a blacksmith from Rune Factory 3
- Gaius, a character from the RPG game Tears to Tiara
- Gaius, the third colossus in Shadow of the Colossus
- Gaius Worzel, a playable character in The Legend of Heroes: Trails of Cold Steel and its sequels
- John Gaius, the Emperor Undying in Harrow the Ninth

== See also ==
- Caius (disambiguation)
- Gaio
