= Gaius Memmius =

Gaius Memmius may refer to:

- Gaius Memmius (consul 34 BC), Roman senator who was appointed suffect consul in 34 BC
- Gaius Memmius (praetor 58 BC), Roman poet, orator, tribune of the people in 66 BC, and believed to be the dedicatee of Lucretius' De rerum natura (On the Nature of Things)
- Gaius Memmius (proconsul of Macedonia), Roman tribune in 111 BC, who was put to death in 100 BC by Saturninus so Servilius Glaucia could become consul
- Gaius Memmius, brother-in-law of Pompey the Great (married to his sister Pompeia). Memmius served Pompey during his Sicilian campaign (81 BC) and during the Sertorian War.

== See also ==
- Saint Memmius, first bishop of Châlons-sur-Marne
- Quintus Fabius Memmius Symmachus, died 402 CE
