= Caius Novac =

Romanian footballer

Personal information
- Date of birth: 17 August 1921
- Place of birth: Lipova, Romania
- Date of death: Unknown
- Position: Defender

Senior career*
Years	Team	Apps	(Gls)
1940–1942	Gloria Arad		
1942–1947	Carmen București (Note: The Divizia A 1940–41 was the last season before World War II and the Divizia A 1946–47 was the first one after, so the appearances and goals scored during this period for Carmen București are not official with the exception of the 1945–46 regional championship.)	38	(1)
1947–1948	Ciocanul București	28	(1)
1948–1951	Dinamo București	59	(0)
1952	Dinamo Brașov	8	(0)
Total		133	(2)

International career
1947	Romania	1	(0)
- * Club domestic league appearances and goals

Caius Novac (born 17 August 1921, date of death unknown) was a Romanian football defender. On 21 November 1948 he played in the first ever CSCA București – Dinamo București derby.

== International career ==
Novac made one appearance at international level for Romania, in a 4–0 away victory against Albania at the 1947 Balkan Cup.
