= Gaius Ateius Capito =

Gaius Ateius Capito may refer to:

- Gaius Ateius Capito (tribune), tribune of the people in 55 BCE
- Gaius Ateius Capito (jurist), senator and jurist under Augustus and Tiberius
