= Caio Mendes =

Brazilian footballer (born 1986)

Personal information
- Full name: Caio Roberto Freire Mendes
- Date of birth: 1 June 1986 (age 40)
- Place of birth: São Paulo, Brazil
- Height: 1.86 m (6 ft 1 in)
- Position: Defender

Team information
- Current team: Grêmio Barueri

Youth career
- SE Palmeiras

Senior career*
Years	Team	Apps	(Gls)
1999–2004	SE Palmeiras		
2005	National AC		
2006	Internacional de Limeira		
2007–2008	Mirassol FC		
2009	Nacional FC		
2009	Uberlândia EC	10	(1)
2010	Marília AC	9	(0)
2010–2012	IFK Norrköping	16	(0)
2012–2013	IK Brage	1	(0)
2013–	Grêmio Barueri		
- * Club domestic league appearances and goals as of 13 March 2013

Caio Roberto Freire Mendes (born 1 June 1986) is a Brazilian footballer who plays for Grêmio Barueri as a defender. He is the brother of Daniel Mendes.
