= Elsa Cayo =

Peruvian filmmaker

Elsa Cayo (also known as Elsa Cayo Cordova; born 1951 in Lima, Peru) is a Peruvian-born filmmaker, and photographer.

Her work is included in the collections of the Museum of Modern Art, New York, the Musée national des beaux-arts du Québec, Centre Pompidou, and the National Gallery of Canada.
