= Gaius Livius Drusus =

Gaius Livius Drusus may refer to:

- Gaius Livius Drusus (consul), Roman consul in 147 BC
- Gaius Livius Drusus (jurist), blind jurist
- Gaius Livius Drusus, presumed brother of empress Livia
