= Caius Gabriel Cibber =

Danish sculptor

Caius Cibber
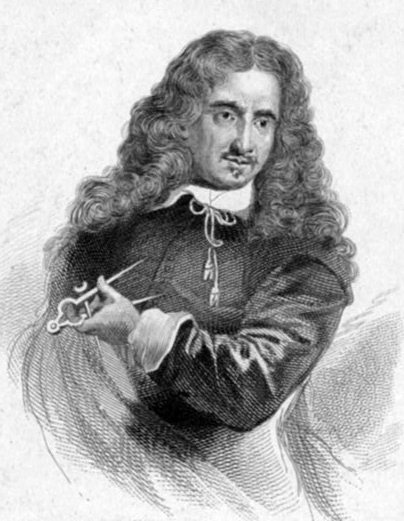
- Cibber by William Edwards
- Born: 1630; Flensburg, Schleswig
- Died: 1700 (aged 69–70); London, England, Kingdom of England
- Known for: Sculpture
- Spouse: Jane Colley
- Children: Colley and 2 others
- Relatives: Charlotte Charke (granddaughter) Theophilus Cibber (grandson) Catherine Cibber (daughter-in-law)

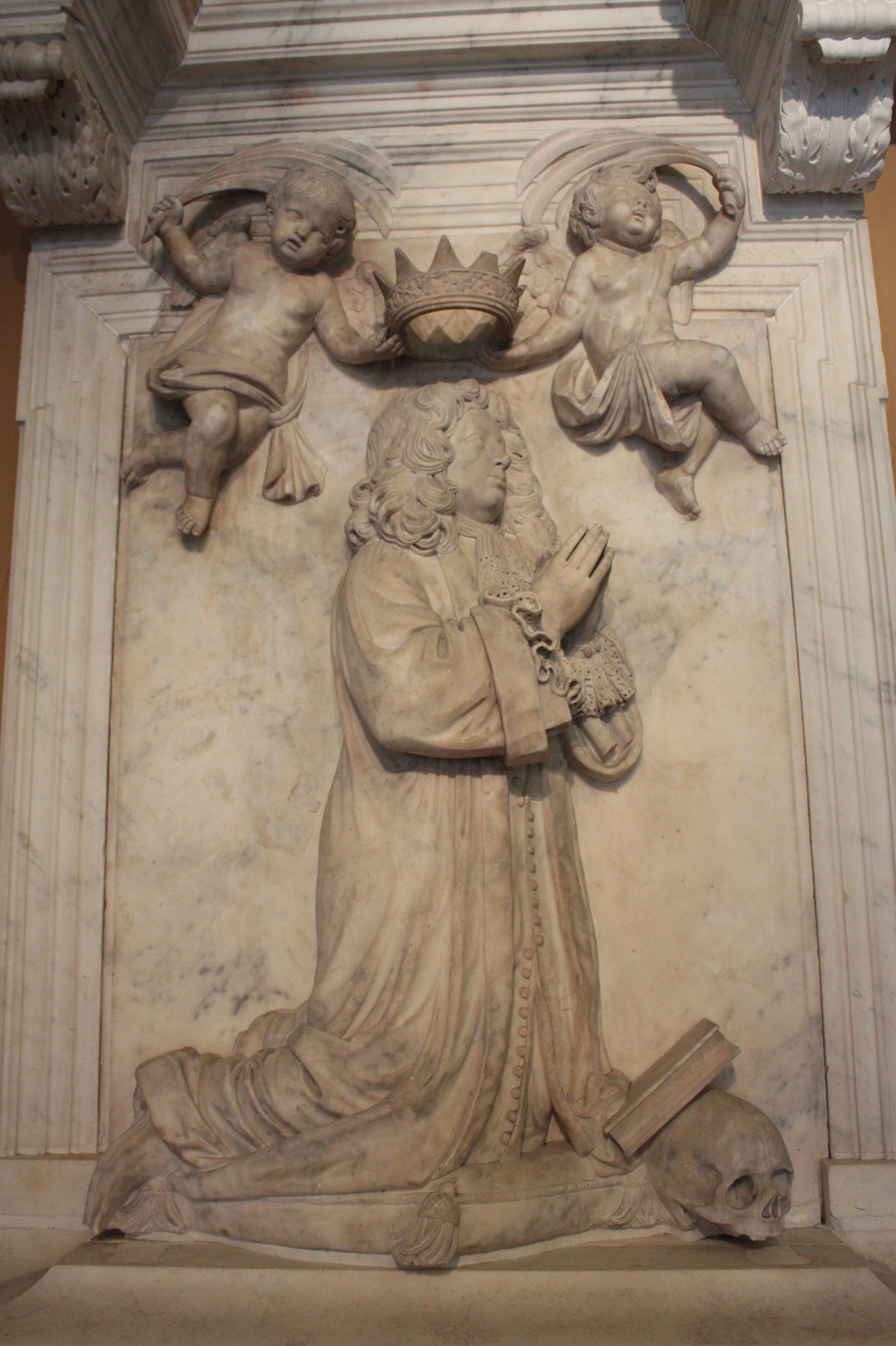
Tomb of Francis Musters, 1680, by Caius Gabriel Cibber, Victoria and Albert Museum

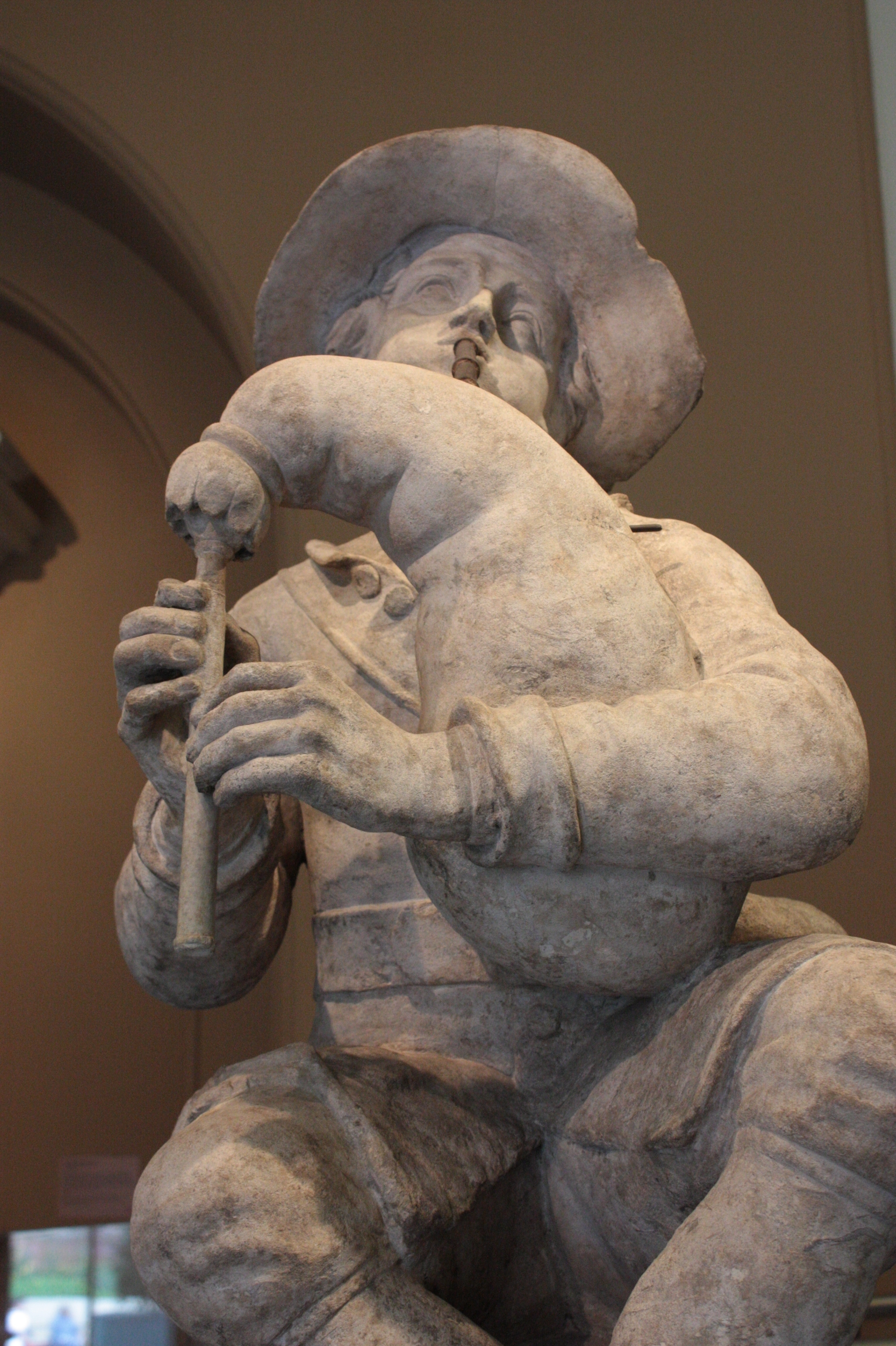
Boy with Bagpipes by Caius Gabriel Cibber c.1680, V&A (formerly at Stowe House)

Caius Gabriel Cibber (1630 – 1700) was a Danish sculptor, who enjoyed great success in England, and was the father of the actor, author and poet laureate Colley Cibber. He was appointed "carver to the king's closet" by William III.

== Biography ==
Cibber was born in Flensburg in the province of Schleswig in Denmark. His father was a cabinetmaker, supposedly to King Frederick III of Denmark. He travelled to Italy to study art, where he may have changed his name from Sieber or Sibert to Cibo, to suggest connection with the Cibos, an old and noble Italian family to which Pope Innocent VIII had belonged. Cibber later emigrated to London, England, probably via the Netherlands. At first, he worked for the mason-sculptor John Stone, who had a workshop on Long Acre, until he set up his own studio after Stone's death in 1667.

In 1668, Cibber became a Freeman, by Redemption, of the Worshipful Company of Leathersellers, and in 1679 he became a Liveryman of the same Company, remaining so until his death. He carved the company's coat of arms, and a stone mermaid pump, which stood outside Leathersellers' Hall in Little St Helen's, off Bishopsgate. The mermaid's head survives, having been discovered in excavations at St Helen's Place in 1925.

A decade or more after his arrival in London, Cibber married (as his second wife—his first wife had died) Jane Colley on 24 November 1670 at St Giles in the Fields, London. In the marriage licence documents, Cibber's age is given as 'about 33'. Jane came from a family of English gentry who claimed descent from the sister of William of Wykeham, and her grandfather, Sir Antony Colley, had been a prominent Cavalier during the English Civil War. They had three children: Colley, Lewis, and Veronica. Between 1673 and 1679, Cibber was detained in Marshalsea prison and the King's Bench prison for unpaid gambling debts, though he was able to continue his work, and borrowed substantial sums from Edward Colley, his brother-in-law.

Many of his works were, or are, on public display in London, including his statue of Charles II (1681), which still stands (rather worn away) in Soho Square. He made two lifelike human statues in Portland stone entitled "Melancholy" and "Raving Madness" for the gates of the 17th century mental hospital, known as Bedlam (now Bethlem Royal Hospital), which can currently be seen in their museum (modelli in V&A). They were said to be modelled on two inmates of the asylum, one of whom was Oliver Cromwell's mad porter, Daniel. The two statues became his most famous work, and were mentioned in Alexander Pope's satire The Dunciad. He also created the bas reliefs on the base of the Monument to the Great Fire of London; his reliefs at the Royal Exchange have been destroyed. He produced sets of sculpture for Trinity College, Cambridge, and for the Danish Church on Wellclose Square, where he was buried. The church was demolished in 1869 and the grave was lost at that point.

== Major works ==
Cibber worked extensively with the architects Sir Christopher Wren (on St Paul's Cathedral and Hampton Court Palace) and William Talman (on Chatsworth House (1688–91) and the version of Thoresby Hall which was entirely burnt down in 1745).

Cibber produced a number of excellent church monuments, including those to the 7th and 8th Earls of Rutland at Bottesford, Leicestershire, and the extraordinary Sackville monument at Withyham in East Sussex. A Flora in the gardens at Chatsworth has in recent years been returned to the Temple named after her; other large works there include the Sea Horse Fountain.

== Other works ==
- Seven statues for Belvoir Castle (1680)
- Statues of "Melancholy" and "Raving Madness" for Bethlehem Hospital (1680) now in the Bethlem Museum of the Mind.
- Boy playing Bagpipes originally at Welcombe (1680) now in the Victoria and Albert Museum
- Statue on Library, Trinity College, Cambridge (1681)
- Statue of Charles II in Soho Square (1681)
- Statue of William of Wykeham at Winchester College (1697).

== Gallery ==
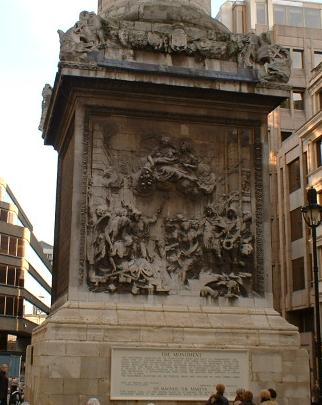
Bas relief on the base of the Monument to the Great Fire of London

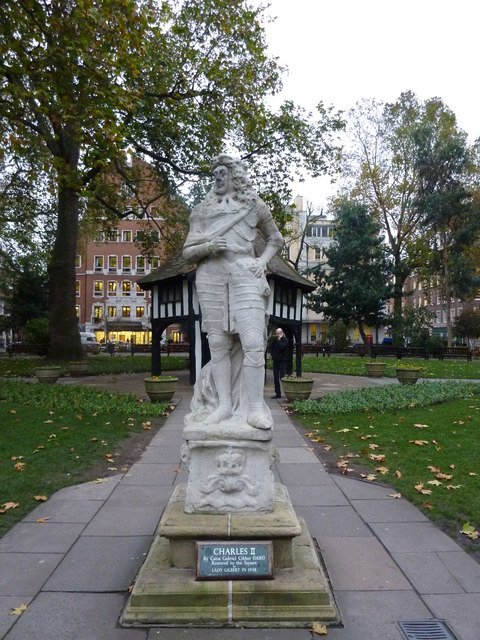
Statue of Charles II in Soho Square

== Sources ==
- Ashley, Leonard R. N. (1965) Colley Cibber, New York: Twayne Publishers.
- Barker, Richard Hindry (1939) Mr Cibber of Drury Lane, New York:Columbia University Press.
- Chisholm, Hugh, ed. (1911). "Cibber, Caius Gabriel" . Encyclopædia Britannica. Vol. 6 (11th ed.). Cambridge University Press. pp. 350–351.
- Koon, Helene (1986) Colley Cibber: A Biography, Lexington, Kentucky: University Press of Kentucky, ISBN 0-8131-1551-5
- Fagan, Louis Alexander (1887). "Cibber, Caius Gabriel" . In Stephen, Leslie (ed.). Dictionary of National Biography. Vol. 10. London: Smith, Elder & Co.
