= Dolores (artists' model) =

- Dolores in an artistic pose
- Born: Norine Schofield; 11 March 1894; London, England
- Died: 8 August 1934 (aged 40); London, England
- Other name: Norine Fournier Lattimore
- Occupation: Artists' model

Norine Fournier Lattimore (née Schofield; 11 March 1894 – 8 August 1934), known as Dolores, was an artists' model who was a fixture on London's bohemian scene between the First and Second World Wars. She posed for Jacob Epstein, for whom she played the role of "the High Priestess of Beauty" and who called her "the Phryne of modern times". The Hearst Press in America, who sensationally serialised her life story, called her The "Fatal Woman' of the London Studios". She was a contemporary of Betty May, Euphemia Lamb and Lilian Shelley.

== Early life ==
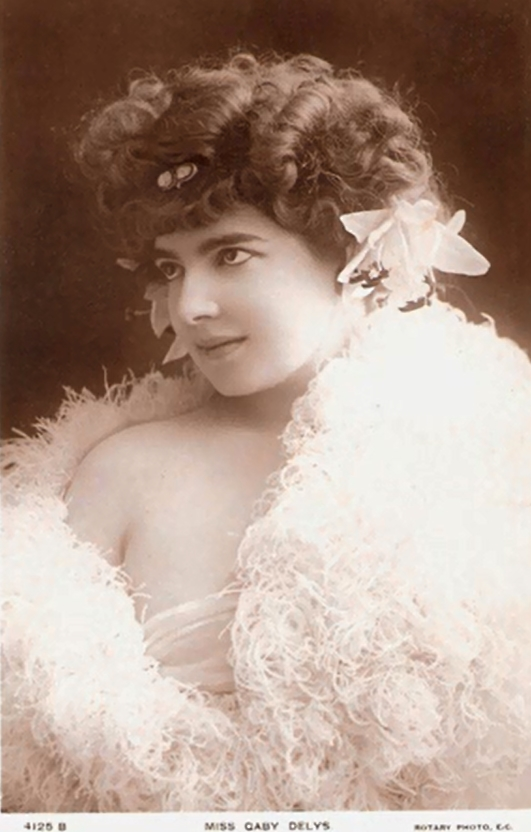
Gaby Deslys was with Dolores at the Tiller Dancing School

Norine Schofield was born at 23 Doughty Street, London, on 11 March 1894. In the British census of 31 March 1901, Norine is shown as aged 8 and living at 73 St Paul's Road, Islington with her father George E. Schofield (aged 37, described as a "vocalist"), her mother Maria (37, a French subject), her half-brother Leopole Kershaw (19), half-sister Melfredine Kershaw (actress, 17), half-sister Yvonne Kershaw (11) and her sister Mabel Schofield (3). According to the census, all of Norine's half-siblings were born in Rochdale, Lancashire, Mabel was born in London and her father was born in Ashton-under-Lyne.

Norine's father, George Edwin Schofield, had a career as a professional dancer, had sung at the opera and was said to have provided the finance for several stage productions. By the time of Norine's death he had become the Reverend Schofield. Her mother was Vicomtesse Marie Honorine Melfredine de Fournier who was half French and half Spanish, Norine being the diminutive of Honorine. Norine would later claim to be the granddaughter of General Count Fournier.

Norine attended Tiller's Dancing School at the same time as Gaby Deslys and appeared in several Tiller productions as a junior.

== Paris and Brussels ==
Some time after leaving the Tiller School, Norine travelled to Paris where she joined the company of L'Opéra Comique run by the ballet mistress Madame Mariquita and it may be around that time that she began to use the name Dolores.

She met Sarah Bernhardt and appeared in the Folies Bergère for impresario André Charlot. She appeared with Adolph Bolm at the Théâtre Royal de la Monnaie in Brussels and the Alhambra and danced in front of the German Kaiser Wilhelm II for which he gave her a gold powder-box.

She also danced with Anna Pavlova, and sang in opera and appeared in Ivan the Terrible. Despite her success on the continent, however, Dolores does not seem to have become well known in England until she later became a model for Jacob Epstein.

== Frank Amsden ==
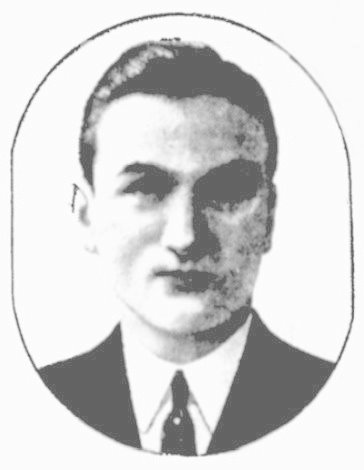
Dolores' first husband Frank Amsden, who killed himself

In 1915, Dolores married Second Lieutenant William Frank Amsden of the Rangers at St Pancras Church, Ipswich, in which town he was stationed. They later divorced but she returned to him after her second marriage ended. He subsequently killed himself.

== Harry Sadler ==
In 1918, Dolores married her second husband, Captain Richard Harry Farwell Peckover Sadler in Kensington. According to details that were given in court during their divorce proceedings (1924), Sadler met Dolores while he was a cadet in the military and he married her while on leave. After he was demobilised, Sadler discovered that she had been living with Amsden but he forgave her. Later he left her and subsequently discovered that she was living with an older man (probably Jacob Epstein). After that, probably in a staged discovery to facilitate a divorce, he went to a house in Cranley Gardens with a solicitor's clerk at which he found Dolores in a bedroom with a man called Edward Bonneymead. Sadler's petition for divorce was not defended and he was granted decree nisi.

== Bohemian London ==
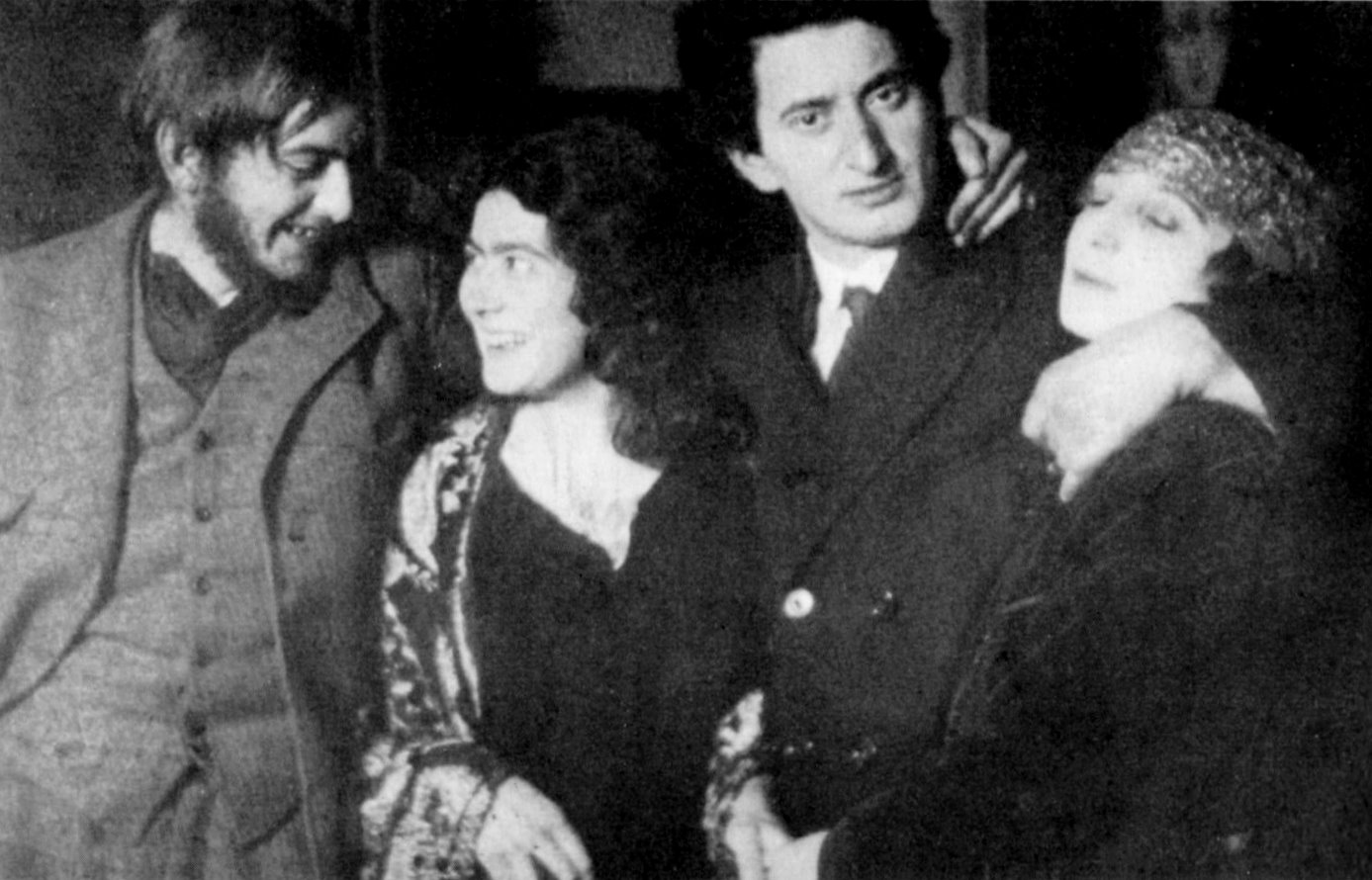
Roy and Mary Campbell (left), Jacob Kramer and Dolores (right). 1920s.

Dolores was a fixture in the inter-war years in London's bohemian circles. She sang and danced at Madame Strindberg's The Cave of the Golden Calf (1912–14), was a regular at the Fitzroy Tavern and knew Betty May, Lilian Shelley and the artistic group that they mixed with. Dolores was of striking appearance, noted for her black hair and white skin and the black dress that she usually wore. Like May and Shelley, Dolores used the Fitzroy and the other pubs and clubs frequented by the circle to network for performing or modelling jobs and it was at the Cave of the Golden Calf that she was discovered as an artists' model by Jacob Epstein. The Cave featured frescoes by Epstein. She also sat for Nina Hamnett, C. R. W. Nevinson (1924), John Flanagan (1925) and Jacob Kramer.

Another place that Dolores knew well was the Harlequin Club, at 55 Beak Street, off Regent Street. It became a popular haunt of the poorer bohemians around the 1920s. William Roberts remembered in his posthumously published (1990) memoirs the Harlequin's female customers "whose vocal talents turned the place at times into a sort of Café Chantant, when the dark-skinned Helene sang the 'Raggle-Taggle Gypsies, O!' or Gypsy Lang sang Casey Jones the engine-driver's lament; with the vivacious Betty May, called the Tiger Woman, together with Dolores and the Snake Charmer (so called from her habit of carrying around a small basket of snakes) joining in the chorus."

== Jacob Epstein ==
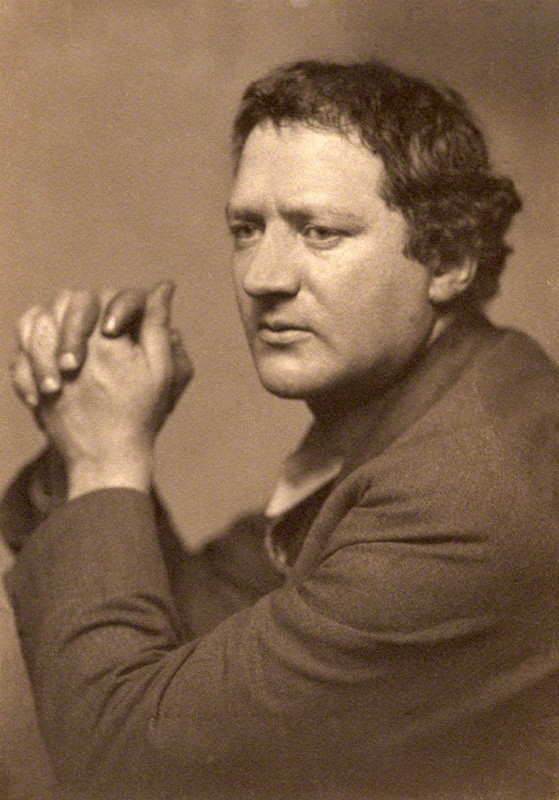
Jacob Epstein in 1916.

Dolores first modelled for Jacob Epstein in 1921, and moved in with him and his wife Margaret at Guilford Street in 1922. She stayed until 1925 and Epstein made six studies of her. Margaret Epstein was trying to end her husband's affair with Kathleen Garman, who eventually became his second wife, by encouraging him into affairs with other women but although Epstein found Dolores beautiful, he apparently had no romantic interest in her. The Epsteins were generous to Dolores, paying for everything, to keep her from leaving. She became, in her own words, "a happy prisoner in Guilford Street" and it was the association with Epstein, who was frequently in the papers, combined with her own talent for self-promotion, that made Dolores famous.

Epstein thought his first study of Dolores a failure but later came to appreciate it and cast it in bronze, after which it entered the Tate Gallery, London. Of the second bust, he said:

"Dolores was a model who was extremely suggestible, and after I made this bust, she always strutted about, keeping her arms folded in the pose of the bust, and with the same tragic and aloof expression fixed upon her face, and she took great care that she never relaxed into those careless smiles of the first head. In the studio she was the devoted model, never allowing anything to interfere with posing, taking it seriously; a religious rite. She became the High Priestess of Beauty".

In 1925 Jacob Epstein completed Rima, a memorial to the American naturalist W. H. Hudson, situated in the W. H. Hudson Memorial bird sanctuary in Hyde Park. The sculpture was unveiled to very strong criticism, including a campaign to have it removed. It was one of the pieces of modern art lampooned in the stage show The Lost Duchess at London's Aldwych Theatre. When Frank Worthington, the producer of the show, came on stage at the end, he was pelted with eggs and tomatoes by Dolores and Anita Patel protesting at the show's criticism of Epstein. Dolores was the model for Rima, and Anita was the sister of Sunita Devi, another of Epstein's models. Dolores was also the model for The Weeping Woman.

== "The Empty Easel" ==
In 1922-23, Dolores appeared in The Nine O'Clock Review at the Little Theatre and in 1923–24 in the sequel The Little Review. The later show had a sketch specially written for her titled "The Empty Easel" in which Dolores posed as famous women in art, including the Mona Lisa, Venus from Titian's Venus and Adonis, Sarah Siddons and herself.

== No stockings ==
In fashion, Dolores modelled for Norman Hartnell's first show in 1924. It was the first time she had appeared as a fashion model. Hartnell remembered in his autobiography Silver and Gold that "My show fascinated the old Daily Graphic to the extent of a whole column about Dolores, Epstein's model, who wore some of my specially statuesque dresses".

The 'Daily Express reported that "She made a sensational entry ... a chocolate-coloured page dressed in a glittering suit of gold brocade announced that she had arrived. Grey curtains were parted for her, and as she came between them she dazzled the eyes of the audience for she wore no fewer than £25,000 worth of diamonds and pearls lent by a Bond Street jeweller. Two detectives stood by ... she was attired in a wonderful steel coloured brocade evening-wrap lined with vivid rose, an excellent contrast to her dark olive skin and pansy brown eyes. When she shed her cloak she showed a simple white satin gown draped around her. She wore gold shoes but no stockings, for she never wears stockings."

== George Lattimore ==
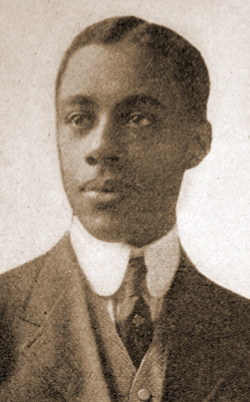
George Lattimore, Dolores' third husband

Dolores' third marriage was to the American lawyer, orchestra manager, and film and theatrical producer George Lattimore in London in 1926. The marriage was described as "secret" in more than one American newspaper. Lattimore had come to Britain in 1919 as the manager of the Southern Syncopated Orchestra which was one of the first orchestras to introduce jazz to Britain. He toured with the orchestra and was responsible for several films and musical events at the Philharmonic Hall in the early 1920s. Dolores lost her British nationality with the marriage which subsequently caused her minor difficulties with the law. The couple quickly separated but never divorced.

Also in 1926, Dolores had a minor role in Riki Tiki at the Gaiety Theatre in London. The show lasted just two weeks after being badly received. She followed this with a dancing act with a partner in the music halls.

== Suicide of Frederick Atkinson ==
On the night of 2–3 January 1929, the artist Frederick (Fred) Atkinson, aged 20, killed himself by coal gas poisoning at his studio at Blomfield Road, Maida Hill, London. He was found on the floor with a tube near his mouth and his head covered in an eiderdown. At the inquest into Atkinson's death, it was explained that he was the son of a Rotherham coal miner. He had been dining with Mrs Mabel Fredericke, an art dealer of the King's Galleries, when he spotted Dolores and expressed a wish to paint her. The two were soon living together. Dolores promised Atkinson that she could get him work and he spent money on her in that expectation.

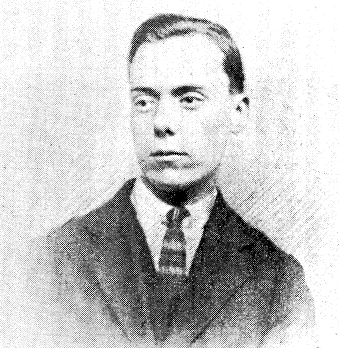
Frederick Atkinson killed himself in 1929.

According to Mabel Fredericke, however, Dolores was already living with another artist and once she had spent all of Atkinson's money (£150-200), returned to that man. When Dolores was reproached by Fredericke for ruining Atkinson, she supposedly said "I had to leave him, he was so melodramatic, and was always threatening to take his life." Atkinson was said to have worshipped Dolores and to have written a book of poetry for her. According to Fredericke, Atkinson could not cope with the news that Dolores was living with another man.

When found, Atkinson possessed little more than a shilling. He left a note for his mother: "I am finished. I cannot get work now until it pleases the dealers to give it to me, and they are very busy just now. I have been very foolish, but my chief fault had been my generosity. I trusted too much..." The note was signed "Your broken-hearted son". Atkinson's body was returned to Rotherham where after a service at the Parkgate Spiritualist Temple he was buried in the Haugh Lane Cemetery.

After the inquest, at which she did not give evidence, Dolores defended her conduct, saying "I am not a heartless vampire, I wanted to save him". She was interviewed by reporters at about the same time at her lodgings, an attic room in Pelham Street, South Kensington. She was dressed entirely in black and wore a small leather purse around her neck which she apparently told reporters contained her most cherished item, a love poem from Atkinson which began "O Dolores, fatal one". Dolores opined: "If only I could communicate with him tonight ... I am a spiritualist. My father is a confirmed spiritualist. Atkinson, too, was a spiritualist ... Soon I am going to get him to come back."

== Rescued by Herbert Darnley ==
She soon had to leave Pelham Street as she could not pay the rent. She collapsed from hunger in a West End club. On 23 January 1929 she was interviewed by the Daily Mail at rooms in the Fulham Road where she was in bed with pneumonia and pleurisy and clearly in distress.

Later in 1929, she obtained the lead in By Whose Hand? by the British music hall comedian and theatrical impresario Herbert Darnley, a murder story that was staged at the Pavilion Theatre in Leicester. Darnley gave a speech in which he said he was pleased to remove Dolores from the "human wolves" of London who "were trying to tear her to pieces." She held the role for over six months and the production took in Mexborough and the Theatre Royal, Sheffield.

== Philip Yale Drew ==
In February 1930, Dolores entered the cast of The Monster at the Theatre Royal, Hanley, and met the alcoholic American actor Philip Yale Drew who had been suspected of murder in 1929. Dolores told reporters, presumably in reference to the Atkinson suicide, "Mr Drew and I feel that we shall be able to pull well. We both think we have been badly treated ... We are temperamentally suited to each other."

Drew had been implicated in the murder of Alfred Oliver, a tobacconist, in Reading, Berkshire, in 1929. The police had strongly suspected Drew of the offence and the coroner's enquiry into the death had been widely seen as amounting to a murder trial with Drew as the accused. In the verdict, the jury foreman said they were unable "to definitely establish the guilt of any particular person" and so Drew was cleared of a murder with which he had never been charged. He was not subsequently charged with any offence by the police. The inappropriateness of a trial by coroner's inquest led to calls for changes to the law.

On 7 March, it was announced in the Daily Mail that Drew and Dolores were engaged to be married. Dolores declared that she was "certain we are going to be wonderfully happy" while Drew pronounced that Dolores "has a great big heart. She is as temperamental as a leaf in a wind." Just days later the Daily Mail printed a letter from a former landlady complaining that Drew and Dolores, who had rented rooms from her as a married couple, had left without paying the bill. After inquiries by reporters at 35 Devonshire Street, Islington, where the couple were living as Mr & Mrs Drew, Dolores paid the amount due, claiming to have thought it had already been settled. It was not the first or the last time that Drew would face charges of failing to pay his debts and he appeared in court several times on similar matters. The couple had enough money at first for Dolores to have a maid and Drew a valet but soon they were short again and they moved to rooms above a shop at 202 King's Road, Chelsea. From there they moved to rooms at 44 Cathcart Road, Fulham. Dolores wrote from there to one of the police officers with whom Drew was in contact, asking the officer to visit her as she had something to tell him. When the officer arrived, however, she was unable to talk as Drew was there, managing only a whisper "I can't tell you now, he's here." She never did tell the police what she knew and soon after, the couple separated.

== Hearst press ==
In 1930, Dolores' life story was told in the Hearst Press in America in a series of sensational articles that appeared in newspapers throughout the country. The death of Frederick Atkinson was covered as well as life in the Epstein household. Epstein later described the articles as "packed full of inventions conceived by the not very scrupulous brains of the scribblers who seized on her notoriety and exploited it."

== Last years ==
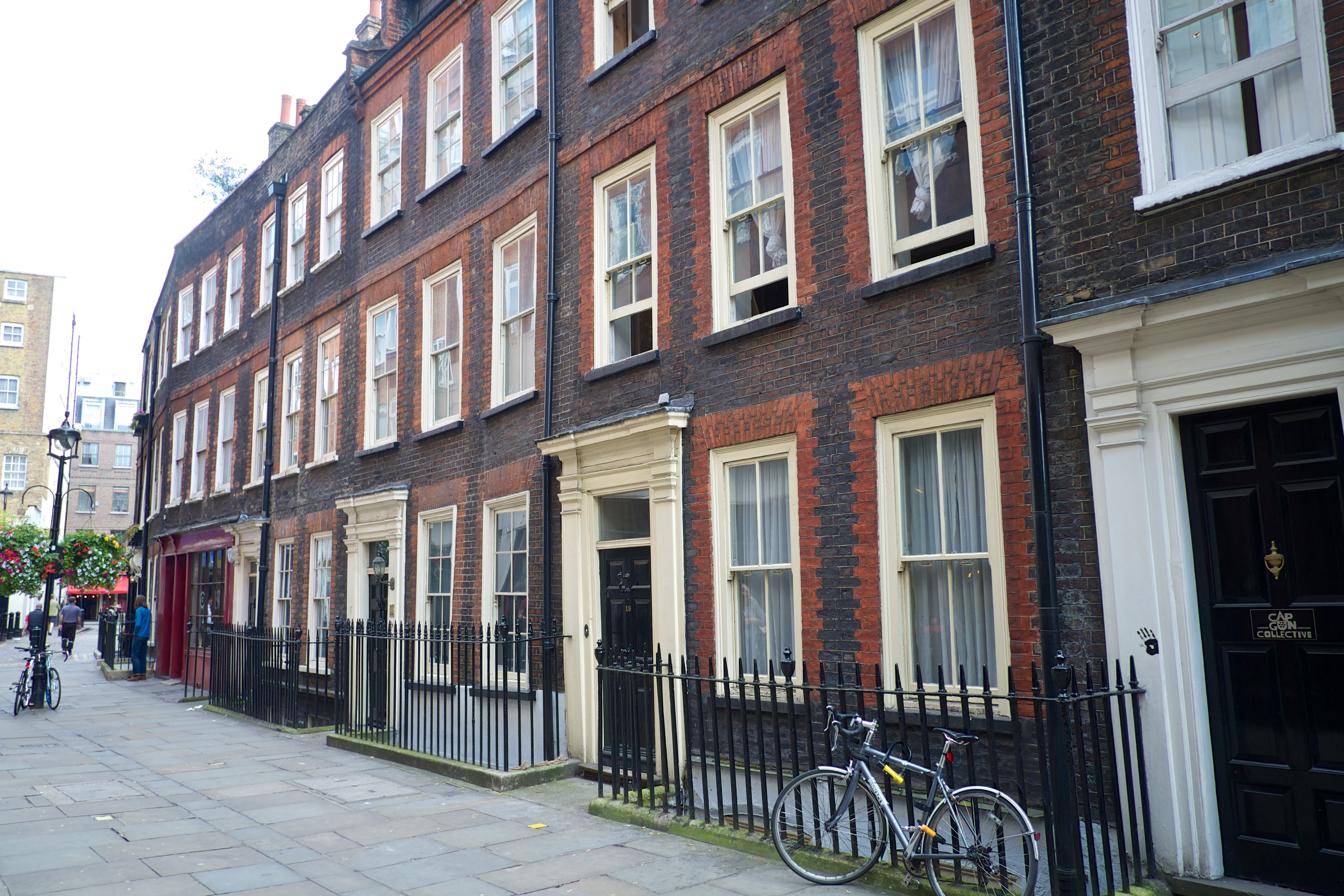
Meard Street today

In her later years, Dolores lived a hand-to-mouth existence fluctuating between poverty and temporary surpluses if she managed to get work but she never had any capital and never owned any property apart from what she could carry. By November 1931, she was living in Meard Street, Soho, an area known as a centre of prostitution. In July 1932 she was ill in a nursing home in Dorset Square and in January 1933 she was living in a basement off Oxford Street. She last appeared in public "fasting in a barrel" at a fun-fair in Tottenham Court Road, in the same barrel once occupied by the defrocked Rector of Stiffkey, who was in a similar desperate financial situation. She graduated to a small raised dais where she would strike artistic poses when a sufficient crowd had gathered. She underwent two operations for cancer during the last year of her life but by October 1933 knew that she would not recover. She died in St Mary Abbots Hospital, Marloes Road, Kensington, London on 8 August 1934 and was buried at St Mary's Catholic Cemetery, Kensal Green (Plot 90 c. G.). There were four mourners.

== Biographical confusion ==
Dolores was the name of a number of well known women at this time, such as actress Dolores del Río, and Kathleen Wilkinson (stage name Dolores), an English woman who made a name as a Ziegfeld girl and mannequin in New York. It was said that, in their obituary of Epstein's Dolores, published 20 August 1934, The New York Times confused three different women by that name.
