= Betty May =

British model (1894–1980)

Betty May

Betty May (born Bessie Golding 25 August 1894 – 5 May 1980) was a British singer, dancer, and model, who worked primarily in London's West End. She was a member of the London Bohemian set of the inter-war years, claimed to have joined a criminal gang in Paris, was associated with occultist Aleister Crowley, and sat for Augustus John and Jacob Epstein. She became known as the "Tiger Woman". She adopted the name Betty May early in life, for reasons that are unclear.

== Early life ==
Tidal Basin is adjacent to the Royal Victoria Dock

Bessie Golding was born in Tidal Basin, Canning Town, London, in August 1894. She was the second of five children born to George Golding (1871–1915) and Ellen Theresa Golding (née James; b. 1872). She was born into poverty. The only known account of her early life is her autobiography Tiger Woman, in which May writes that her father left the family when she was very young, leaving her mother to raise four children on the ten shillings a week she earned working long hours. The family had little furniture and no bed, so they slept on bundles of rags at night. May (erroneously) identified her mother as being half French and described her as good-looking, with an olive complexion and dark eyes, features May claimed to have inherited. May described her grandmother, who lived nearby, as a formidable character who influenced her life.

According to May, when the struggle of supporting four children became overwhelming, her mother sent May and her brother George (1892–1986) to live with their father. It was the first time May had ever seen him. He was an engineer by profession, but was living a life of idleness, drink and violence in a brothel run by his girlfriend in Limehouse. May wrote that she and her brother left the house after her father was arrested by his father, an inspector of police, and later jailed. She first stayed with her paternal grandmother and then with her aunt and uncle on a barge, where she was washed frequently, taught the Lord's Prayer, and had her hair brushed more than she thought necessary but was otherwise ignored. She described herself as a "little brown-faced marmoset ... and the only quick thing in this very slow world." Her aunt described her as "a regular little savage". May earned pennies singing and dancing for sailors on passing vessels. Some time later she was sent to live with another aunt who had a farm in Somerset where May attended the village school.

== Coster roots, gypsy style ==
In her autobiography, May described her "coster" (costermonger) roots as being inherited from her grandmother, saying "I am a true coster in my flamboyance and my love of colour, in my violence of feeling and its immediate response in speech and action. Even now I am often caught with a sudden longing regret for the streets of Limehouse as I knew them, for the girls with their gaudy shawls and heads of ostrich feathers, like clouds in a wind, and the men in their caps, silk neckerchiefs and bright yellow pointed boots in which they took such pride. I adored the swagger and the showiness of it all."

May was small, green-eyed, and dressed like a gypsy. She stated in her autobiography that soon after she arrived in London she "could only afford one outfit, but every item of it was a different colour. Neither red nor green nor blue nor yellow nor purple was forgotten, for I loved them all equally, and if I was not rich enough to wear them separately ... I would wear them, like Joseph in the Bible, all at once! Colours to me are like children to a loving mother."

After she became involved with the London Bohemian set which included Augustus John, who also affected a gypsy style, Anthony Powell said: "her hair tied up in a coloured handkerchief, she would not have looked out of place telling fortunes at a fair." Indeed, May's most popular song as an entertainer was "The Raggle-Taggle Gypsies" which she was said to have performed at Wally's, a subterranean club in Fitzroy Street, while removing her skirt and twirling it in front of her. She also sang "Sigh No More Ladies", "Bonnie Earl O'Murray" and "There Lived a Girl in Amsterdam".

== Café Royal set ==
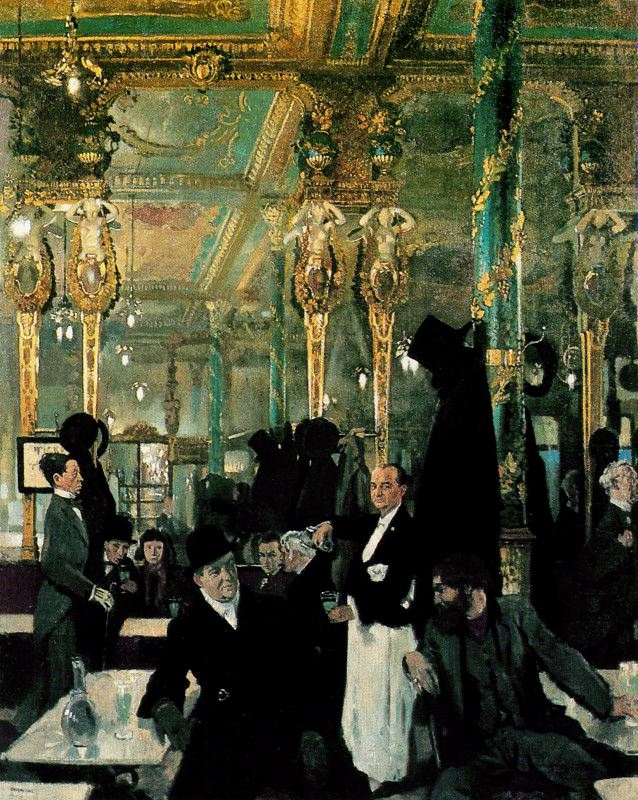
The Café Royal, London (William Orpen, 1912)

Around 1910, May travelled to London where she quickly became familiar with the pubs and clubs of the West End. She became a regular at the Endell Street Club and the Café Royal which before World War I was a much different place from the later Café Royal. May described it as a real café with sawdust on the floor, cheap drinks and gilded decorations "as gaudy and as bright as possible" where you could get a plate of chips for sixpence. May said, "The lights, the mirrors, the red plush seats, the eccentrically dressed people, the coffee served in glasses, the pale cloudy absinthe ... [I] felt as if I had strayed by accident into some miraculous Arabian palace" continuing "No duck ever took to water, no man to drink, as I to the Café Royal".

She met the painter Augustus John and the sculptor Jacob Epstein. It was Epstein in particular who introduced her to other members of the Bohemian set, which including the "Queen of Bohemia" Nina Hamnett, prankster Horace de Vere Cole, heiress Nancy Cunard, painter William Orpen, Anna Wickham, Iris Tree and poet Ezra Pound, many of whom May knew.

At the Café and other central London venues, penniless models networked for work among London's artists. Those who could, like Betty May, also performed in order to make a living and in many cases women occupied a grey area between professional model and prostitute. The lives of many of May's contemporaries ended tragically. Among them were Lilian Shelley, also known as "The Bug" or "The Pocket Edition", who later killed herself; the suffragette Laura Grey, who overdosed on veronal in 1914; Sunita Devi who was reported to have been poisoned; Bobby Channing; and Lilian Browning. Others are identified only by first names or pseudonyms: "The Limpet", who was always falling in love; Eileen, who modelled for Augustus John and was shot by her lover; and Bunny, who received a six-month sentence for bigamy and was later strangled by a man in Brixton. Other models May knew included Euphemia Lamb (Nina Forrest), wife of the painter Henry Lamb.

Apart from the Café, May sang and danced at the Cabaret Theatre Club, which later became the Cave of the Golden Calf under the ownership of Madame Strindberg and featured frescoes by Epstein. According to May, when not entertaining, she was educated in taste by a distinguished older man she christened "the Cherub", with whom her relationship was strictly platonic.

== "Tiger Woman" ==
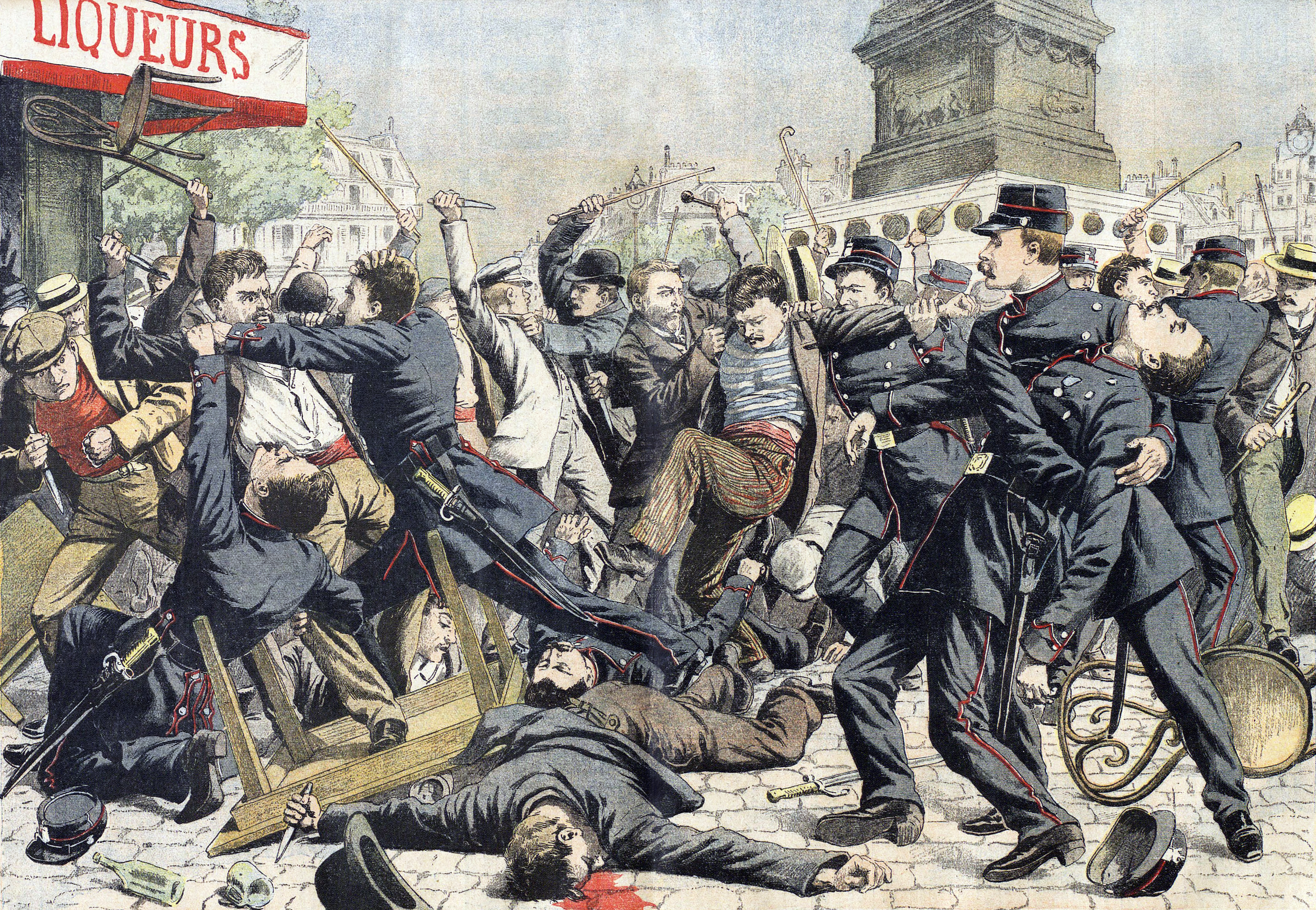
Apaches battle French police, Le Petit Journal, 14 August 1904

May gave her version of how she came to be known as the "Tiger Woman" in her 1929 autobiography of the same name. There is no independent confirmation of the story, but according to May, soon after meeting the Cherub, and before the outbreak of World War I in 1914, she became involved with a criminal known as the White Panther, a member of L'Apache Gang, whom she met in a bar. May wrote that she went with him to Paris and after arriving at the gang's lair was immediately set upon by the Panther's girl Hortense who saw May as a rival. May wrote of the moments after the Panther broke up the fight, "I must say that I was in a frightful passion ... when White Panther dragged me by the hair to my feet, In an instant my teeth had met in his wrist ... "Tigre" he muttered" and in this way May claimed to have earned the nickname "Tiger Woman".

Other sources, however, attribute the name to a tiger skin coat or outfit she wore or a party trick that involved crawling on all fours and drinking from a saucer like a cat. May herself, in the 1934 Crowley libel case, implied that the name had been made up specifically for her 1929 autobiography, Tiger Woman: My Story, saying: "I am rather feline in looks. I thought perhaps it was rather a good name for me."

== Return to London ==
By 1914, May was in London. According to Nina Hamnett, May and Lilian Shelley were the "principal supports" of the Crab Tree Club on Greek Street founded by Augustus John that year. The Crab Tree was particularly informal with customers making their own entertainment and helping themselves to food. May recalled that there was a pole from the floor to the ceiling which she often had to scamper up if she had played a trick on someone.

May writes in Tiger Woman that she was friendly with a young man called Richard who became ill and died after a canoeing accident while they were out together. She also wrote that she was later engaged to a barrister named Dick and while staying with his family in the country, she went for a stroll with a young farmer who claimed he loved her. According to May, he stumbled, and shot himself fatally in the head when his gun fired accidentally. There is no independent verification of either death however. May wrote in Tiger Woman that she returned to London almost immediately, her engagement to Dick was broken and quickly replaced by a new engagement to a former suitor, Miles Linzee Atkinson, (1888–1917) who May knew as Bunny. Atkinson was a Cambridge University graduate and university blue who May had met prior to her visit to Paris. They were married at the Marylebone Registry Office in the third quarter of 1914.

== Drug use ==
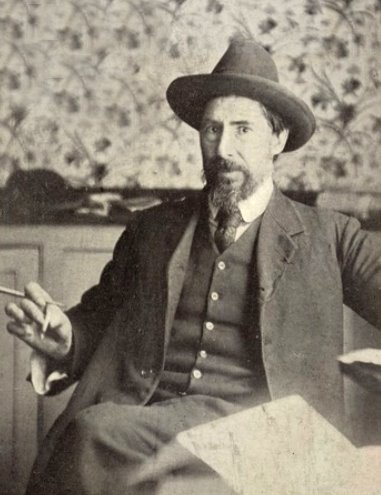
Stewart Gray, activist and hunger marcher

According to May, Atkinson was a cocaine user. A trainee doctor at a London hospital, he had access to as much cocaine as he wanted and May quickly began to use the drug herself. She would later comment that "I learnt one new thing on my honeymoon – to take drugs." May wrote that on their honeymoon they were thrown out of their hotel when the management became suspicious. On their return to London they became part of the unorthodox household of Stewart Gray (founder of the "Back to the Land" movement) in Ormonde Terrace, Primrose Hill. The house was occupied by a constantly changing group of artists and models, usually penniless. It was furnished in the most basic way possible in accordance with Gray's philosophy and was without utilities, even water.

May wrote that she and her husband attended dope parties where "all forms of drug-taking used to be indulged in". They became part of the circle of Billie Carleton and Ada Song Ping You, a Scotswoman who had married a Chinese man (Song Ping You) from whom she learned to use opium. After the war, Carleton was found dead, apparently of an overdose, and Ada Song Ping You was sentenced to five months in jail with hard labour for preparing opium for smoking and supplying it to Carleton.

Atkinson joined the Army in 1914 following the outbreak of the First World War, originally in the Motor Machine Gun Service. According to May, they took a house in Bisley, Surrey while he was training and later May rented a flat in Richmond where she got a job in a shop which she left in a panic after handling Chinese hair-nets which she had read in the newspaper had given a woman leprosy. She moved back to London. According to May, Atkinson demanded a divorce, but died in action in France (1917) before it came through though marriage records appear to show her remarrying at the end of 1916 to a man by the name of Waldron.

May's drug use escalated. By her own account, soon she was taking 100 grains of cocaine per day, and morphia too. Her cocaine habit increased to 150 grains, causing her to become paranoid. She recalled that on one occasion a "waiter brought me white coffee instead of black. Immediately I concluded that the whole world was against me."

=== Dope-Darling ===
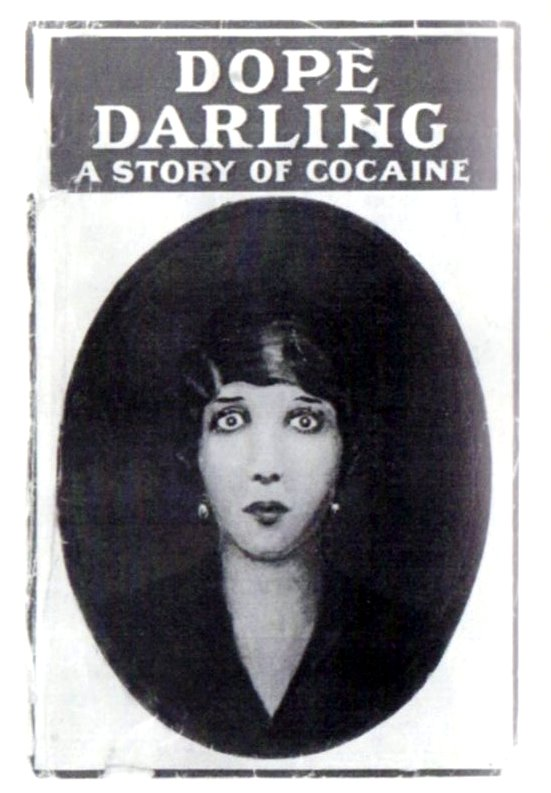
The cover of Dope-Darling: A Story of Cocaine

In 1919, "Bunny" Garnett, writing as Leda Burke, published a sensational novel titled Dope-Darling: A Story of Cocaine whose central female character "Claire" was loosely based on Betty May whom he knew well. The plot revolves around an idealistic young man "Roy" who is taken to a club near Fleet Street frequented by journalists. There he is enraptured by the singer, a sexually experienced young woman who had arrived in London aged sixteen just two years earlier, was duped into taking drugs and then into a life of prostitution. Roy marries Claire and tries to reform her but instead is drawn into drug use himself.

Garnett wrote of Claire:

She was always asked to all the parties given in the flashy Bohemian world in which she moved. No dance, gambling party, or secret doping orgy was complete without her. Under the effect of cocaine which she took more and more recklessly, she became inspired by a wild frenzy, and danced like a Bacchante, drank off a bottle of champagne, and played a thousand wild antics.

The story concludes when Roy and Claire are separated by his military service during the First World War. Claire dies and Roy finds happiness with his childhood sweetheart.

== Second marriage ==
According to Tiger Woman, sometime midway through the First World War, May met an Australian born British Army major she nicknamed Roy who was in the Royal Army Medical Corps, and they were married at the Henrietta Street registry office. Roy's real name was George Dibbs King Waldron (1886-1943); Marriage records show their marriage taking place in St. Martin district, London, during the fourth quarter of 1916. According to May, Waldron beat her if he found her using drugs, and on one occasion, returning home to find that she had attended a dope party that had lasted three days and three nights, he "took off his Sam Browne belt and gave me the severest beating with it I have ever had". She credited the beating as the start to breaking her addiction. Waldron was sent to France and according to May they divorced after she found love letters written to Waldron by a French girl.

== Harlequin Club ==
Betty May claimed to be the model for The Sphinx, Jacob Kramer, oil on canvas, c. 1919.

After the end of the First World War (1918), May sat for Jacob Epstein for the first time at his home in Guilford Street in around 1919 or 1920. The resulting bronze bust with arms crossed was displayed at the Leicester Galleries in 1920. Epstein also completed a bronze head of Betty in 1921. It was also at about this time that she sat for Jacob Kramer's The Sphinx which had been commissioned from Kramer by a Bradford manufacturer who had met May at the Harlequin Club and been much taken with her. According to May, the sittings took place at the Harlequin as Kramer was too poor to be able to afford a studio. May wrote that Kramer fell in love with her and they became engaged but were prevented from marrying by Kramer's mother who would not let him marry a non-Jew (although his sister Sarah married the non-Jewish painter William Roberts and Roberts and her mother apparently got on well). The painting was exhibited at the 1924/25 British Empire Exhibition at Wembley.

The Harlequin Club, at 55 Beak Street, off Regent Street, became a popular haunt of the poorer bohemians around this time. Betty May and her group became regulars. The club was based in the home of Yanni Papani who was also a waiter at the Café Royal. William Roberts remembered in his posthumously published (1990) memoirs the Harlequin's female customers "whose vocal talents turned the place at times into a sort of Café Chantant, when the dark-skinned Helene sang the 'Raggle-Taggle Gypsies, O!' or Gypsy Lang sang Casey Jones the engine-driver's lament; with the vivacious Betty May, called the Tiger Woman, together with Dolores and the Snake Charmer (so called from her habit of carrying around a small basket of snakes) joining in the chorus."

== Abbey of Thelema ==
In autumn 1922, May travelled to Sicily with her third husband Frederick Charles Loveday (later Raoul Loveday) whom she had married earlier that year in Oxford and who had become an acolyte of Aleister Crowley. Loveday was aged 20 or 23, had achieved a first in history from the University of Oxford, and had been published as a poet. They met Nina Hamnett in Paris en route. Hamnett later recalled in Laughing Torso that

he was very good-looking, but looked half dead ... He was very much intrigued with Crowley's views on magic. He had been very ill the year before and had had a serious operation. I had heard that the climate at Cefalu was terrible; heat, mosquitoes, and very bad food. The magical training I already knew was very arduous. I urged them not to go ... but they were determined.

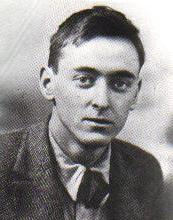
Raoul Loveday, died 1923

Crowley thought Loveday his "magical heir" but condemned the marriage, saying that Loveday had committed the "fatal folly of marrying a girl whom he had met in a sordid and filthy drinking den in Soho, called the Harlequin, which was frequented by self-styled artists and their female parasites". Although Crowley thought the marriage a mistake, he praised May, describing her as a "charming child, tender and simple of soul" but suffering from the consequences of a childhood accident that had "damaged her brain permanently so that its functions were discontinuous" and saying that she had not helped matters by taking to cocaine at age 20. Despite this, Crowley admired her for subsequently curing herself of her addiction, which he said she had done by first switching to morphia and then to alcohol.

Crowley saw his offer of a job to Loveday as a way out of their precarious existence in London which he described as "one filthy room in Fitzroy Street, a foul, frowsty, verminous den ... They were living from hand to mouth, with disaster eternally looming ahead". (They also lived for a time in Beak Street, Soho.) May confirmed in testimony at Crowley's 1934 libel trial that she was supporting them both at the time by sitting as a model for £1 per day and that they were living in one furnished back room. Loveday had little money, no profession and many debts to tradesmen from his time at Oxford. Crowley believed the job would rescue Loveday from the "vagabonds, squalid and obscene, who constituted the court of Queen Betty." In his Confessions, Crowley described, in typically censorious terms, May at work at the Harlequin Club just before she left for Italy: "In a corner was his wife, three parts drunk, on the knees of a dirty-faced loafer, pawed by a swarm of lewd hogs, breathless with lust. She gave herself greedily to their gross and bestial fingerings and was singing in an exquisite voice ... an interminable smutty song, with a ribald chorus in which they all joined".

Although relations between Crowley and May were always cool, Raoul participated enthusiastically in the magical rituals and studies that Crowley set. May took part only reluctantly in order not to be ejected from the Abbey and separated from Raoul. She did spend some time on her own with Crowley. They sometimes went rock-climbing, which was almost the only time they were on friendly terms.

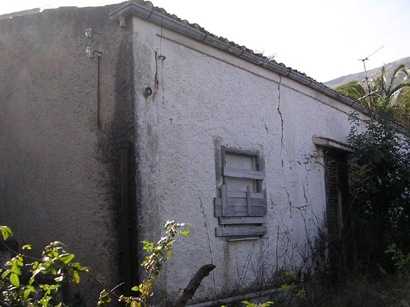
The dilapidated Abbey of Thelema in 2004

According to Tiger Woman, on one occasion May was exploring the Abbey when she came across a chest containing men's ties which were stiff from what she took to be dried blood. She asked Crowley about it and he claimed that they were the ties of Jack the Ripper who had worn a new one before each murder and who he had known and was still alive. Crowley claimed that the Ripper was a surgeon and a magician who had learned to make himself invisible. Crowley also believed that he could make himself invisible through magic.

As their stay went on, Raoul's health, never strong, worsened. He suffered a recurrence of malaria and was diagnosed with acute enteritis. According to May, he took part in a ritual in which he killed a cat and drank its blood. He died at the Abbey of Thelema on 16 February 1923, having drunk water from a stream that Crowley had warned about. May testified under oath in 1934 to the truth of the story about the cat but Crowley was equally emphatic that the incident never happened, testifying that "There was no cat, no animal, no blood, and no drinking".

Since their arrival in Sicily, May had been sending reports to the Sunday Express of activities at the Abbey which they had turned into articles. On her returned to England after the death of her husband she sold the rest of her story for an additional £500 and it appeared in the Sunday Express and John Bull. The details were instrumental in further stoking outrage about Crowley's activities, which had been growing since the publication in 1922 of his Diary of a Drug Fiend. Typical headlines about Crowley in John Bull were "The King of Depravity", "A Man we'd Like to Hang" and "The Wickedest Man in the World", the last being the soubriquet that stuck with Crowley for the rest of his life.

== Princess Waletka ==
According to Tiger Woman, soon after selling her story, May was introduced to "Princess Waletka" at the Waldorf Hotel. The princess was a Vaudeville "mind-reading" entertainer who adopted the style of a Native American. May wrote that she joined Waletka's British theatrical tour and soon after sailed with her for New York before returning to London.

== Fourth marriage ==
According to May, after her return to England, she married for the fourth time, a journalist she nicknamed Carol whose real name was Noel Mostyn Sedgwick (1902–1970). Sedgwick was an editor for The Shooting Times and Country Magazine. May wrote that they moved to live with Sedgwick's mother in the countryside where Sedgwick divided his time between field sports, writing about field sports and talking about them in the local pub.

May writes in Tiger Woman, that one day they visited a local rookery which Sedgwick thought overcrowded. He spent hours shooting the rooks and May had to break the necks of those that fell to the ground alive. She found the work disgusting. A rook-pie was made which she refused to eat. Soon after, Sedgwick fell ill with a high temperature and vomiting. May left the house after her mother-in-law accused her of poisoning Sedgwick with the meals she had prepared.

By the 1930s, she was again describing herself as divorced.

== Model and muse ==
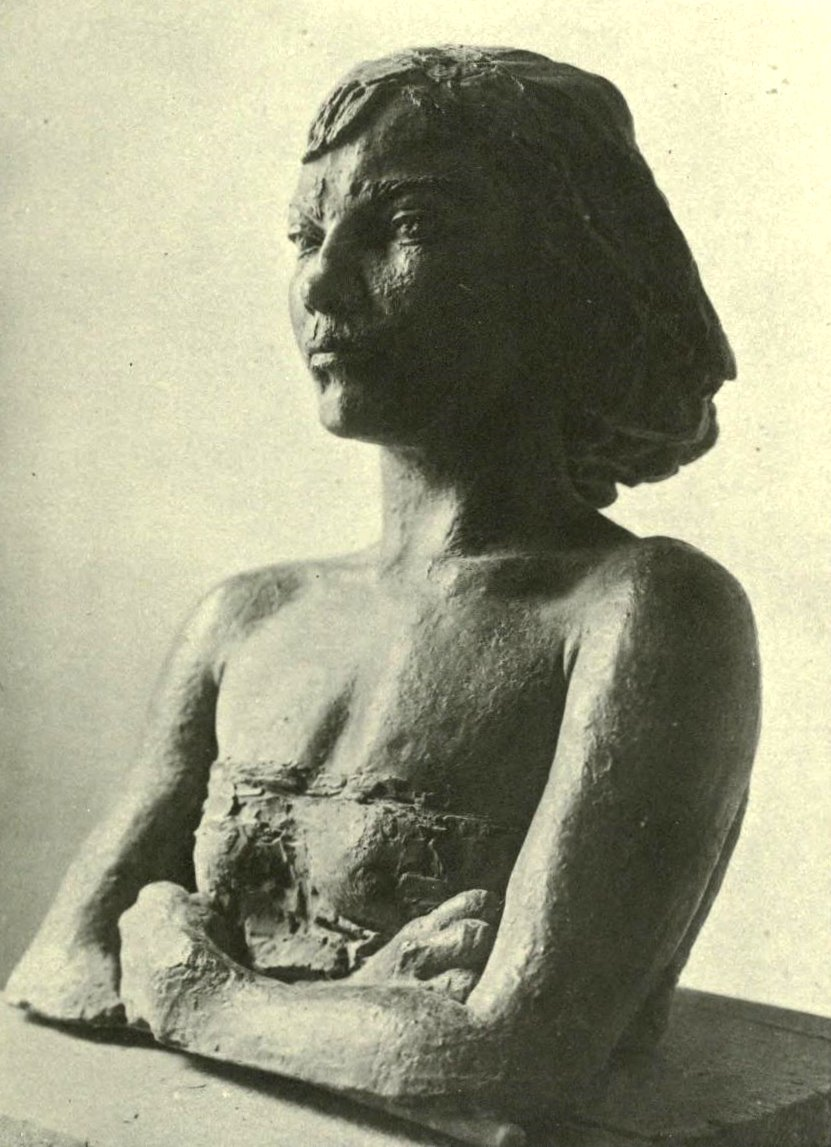
Bust of Betty May by Jacob Epstein.

May became the model for Augustus John, and the sculptors Jacob Kramer and Jacob Epstein. She was drawn by Gerald Reitlinger and Michael Sevier. She had a rival by the name of Dolores who was also of striking appearance and it was not unusual for there to be friction, and even blows, between the two. Dolores died of cancer in 1934.

About July 1928, May had a brief affair with married Australian writer Jack Lindsay, who was also seeing Elza de Locre. They were together in the Fitzroy Tavern one evening and chanced to see poet Edgell Rickword. Lindsay recalled: "I remember going over to Betty, who did not know him, and saying, 'It's Edgell Rickword, the person I most wanted to meet in England'." May soon left Lindsay for Rickword, though the two men became friends. Rickword wrote the poem "The Lousy Astrologer's Present to his Sweetheart", where the speakers are Rickword and May, which was published in the literary magazine London Aphrodite. The first verse, in the male voice, ran:

No Austin-Seven at my door
love's chariot was, but jolting trams
with butts and spittle on the floor
conveyed your peerless hams

In 1929 May, Rickword and two friends were arrested on a weekend trip to Dieppe in northern France after discovering that they did not have enough money to pay their hotel bill. They were all deported back to England. The hotel was next door to the local police station.

Poet, translator and cryptic crossword compiler for The Observer ("Torquemada") Edward Powys Mathers also wrote verse for Betty May, titling one work "Oh, That We Two Were Betty Maying".

In 1928 the Café Royal was renovated and its gilt and mirrors were replaced with a Jazz Age theme that caused it to lose some of its former atmosphere. By the 1930s, the bohemian crowd who once frequented the Café had largely decamped to North Soho, or Fitzrovia as it was beginning to be called, where they were centered on The Fitzroy, and to a lesser extent The Wheatsheaf in Rathbone Place. Dylan Thomas, a regular at both, wrote to his friend Bert Trick in 1934 that "Betty May, is as you probably know, an artist's model – who posed, though that is not perhaps the most correct word, for John, Epstein and the rest of the racketeers". He told Trick that he planned to write an article in May's name, sell it to the News of the World and then ask her to pay him with her body.

In 1933, May was living with Hugh Sykes Davis at South Hill Park Gardens in Hampstead, London. The couple entertained Malcolm Lowry and Jan Gabrial there in the autumn that year. Soon after, May and her former lover Edgell Rickword took the couple to "Kleinfled's" (The Fitzroy Tavern), The Marquis of Granby and The Plough, and finally to Smokey Joe's, "a non-alcoholic speakeasy-cum-lesbian pub".

== Autobiography ==
In 1929, Gerald Duckworth and Company published May's autobiography Tiger Woman: My Story. She promised it would be a frank account of her life but the names of many important characters were changed or missing. The quality of the writing led to suspicions that the book had been ghost-written by one of May's many journalistic and literary friends. During the 1934 Crowley stolen letters trial, May admitted that the book had been written by someone else, based partly on articles she had supplied to the newspapers, though she didn't say who the author was. Challenged about the truth of the book, she testified that "My whole early life and my latter life is very true, but there is one little thing that is untrue", adding that part of the book was written as "padding" and was not true.

The novelist Anthony Powell, then working for Duckworth, called it a "somewhat bizarre work which I was responsible for Duckworth's publishing – not without some trepidation on Balston's part". Powell recalled, "For some time she had been anxious to have certain newspaper articles (bestowing the sobriquet 'Tiger-Woman') cobbled into a book. A young journalist with whom she was then living was prepared to take this job on". According to Powell, when May asked if Jacob Epstein would allow her to dedicate the book to him, he "refused in a cross letter".

Powell mostly dealt with May's ghostwriter by letter regarding the book but May visited him several times at Duckworth. Powell found that contrary to her tigerish reputation, she was "diffident in conversation, articulating with the utmost refinement, [and] always behaved with complete decorum". On meeting Powell's publishing colleague A.G. Lewis, who was himself nervous of May, she was terrified.

Soon after publication, Aleister Crowley took Powell to lunch and expressed his dissatisfaction with Duckworth for publishing the book. Under British law, however, Crowley would only have been able to sue the Sunday Express, where most of the content was originally serialised in 1923, but too much time had passed. The book was reprinted in 2014 to promote the upcoming musical about May's life, written by Celine Hispiche.

== Aleister Crowley ==
=== Libel suit ===
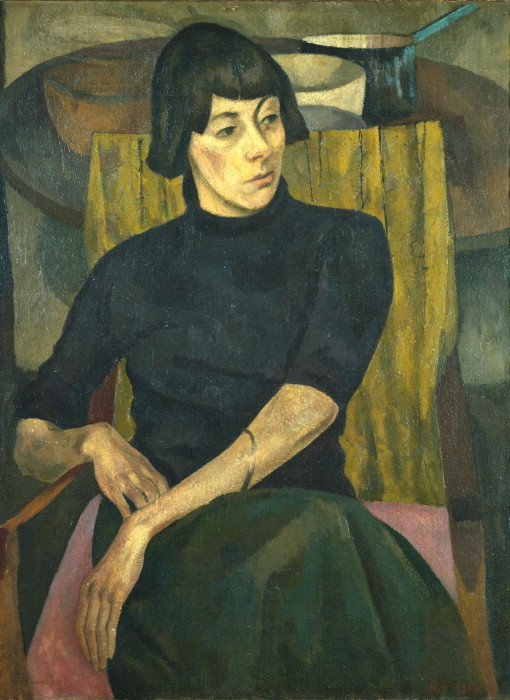
Nina Hamnett, here painted by Roger Fry in 1917, was accused of libelling Aleister Crowley.

In 1934 Betty May was the principal witness in the suit brought by Aleister Crowley against Nina Hamnett for libel in her book Laughing Torso which had alleged that a child had disappeared at the Abbey. By then, May was Mrs Betty May Sedgwick. May testified to the ritual sacrifice of a cat and that her then husband Raoul Loveday had to kill the cat and drink a cup of its blood. As a result of her evidence, May's character and truthfulness were attacked in a long cross-examination by J.P. Eddy, counsel for the plaintiff. May stated, in response to allegations of drug use, that she had taken cocaine for the first time at 18 but not after 25 and she had not "drugged" for years. Asked whether the cats in Italy were wild and destructive, May replied that she only knew two and they were both very charming.

Under cross-examination, May repeatedly faced accusations from Eddy that her testimony had been bought. He produced letters to May from the defendant's solicitors about the expenses she would receive in connection with the case. May claimed that the letters had been stolen from her with the clear implication that they had been stolen by or for Aleister Crowley. The letters were retained by the court. The case was dismissed by the judge.

=== Stolen letters ===
In June 1934, Aleister Crowley was arrested in his solicitor's office on suspicion of receiving stolen goods to the value of 7 1/2d. These were the letters belonging to Betty May dealing with the libel case and her book. At the Old Bailey trial in July that year, May testified that the letters had been stolen from her attaché case by a friend, Captain Eddie Cruze, with whom she had been living at Seymour Street in June the previous year. It emerged in evidence that Cruze had sold the letters to Crowley for £5. Cruze's whereabouts were unknown. Crowley was convicted and bound over for two years.

During the cross-examination, counsel for Crowley tried to impugn May's character, asking her if she thought it fraudulent to publish Tiger Woman as her own work when she now admitted that she was not the author. May replied that she had not thought about it. She said that part of the work was written from articles she had provided to the newspapers and it was partly true, but when pressed admitted that much of it was fabrication.

Around the same time, a popular newspaper printed a photograph with the caption "Miss Nina Hamnett, the artist and author of Laughing Torso, takes a walk in the Park with a friend". The picture, however, showed Betty May. Both May and Hamnett were able to extract £25 from the newspaper within hours of each other on the grounds that both had been libelled. A party at the Fitzroy, funded by the windfall, lasted all day.

== Murder of Douglas Bose ==
In 1936, Douglas Bose (born 1915), a writer and practitioner of black magic was murdered by book-reviewer Douglas Burton (aged 30). Bose had been living with Sylvia Williams (known as Sylvia Gough), a diamond heiress and former dancer who had appeared in The Ziegfeld Follies in New York. Now in London, she had modelled for and become the lover of Augustus John. At Burton's trial, Williams explained that she and Bose had had a stormy relationship and he once gave her a black eye. All three of them, Bose, Burton and Williams, were present at a dinner party in February 1936 at a studio in Canonbury when Burton had said that it was a mistake to give a woman a black eye. Sometime later, after dinner, Burton launched an attack on Bose with a sculptor's hammer or mallet he had picked up. Bose subsequently died from his injuries.

From other witnesses it emerged that Burton believed he would marry Betty May but that he had been very agitated when she did not keep an appointment that he believed they had. A letter was read in court from December 1935 in which Burton said "About the only thing that will evoke the female in woman is murder, bullets, knives. Betty has disappeared. Meanwhile I love her. If we were living together, I should kill her at the end of a few days". Another letter read: "My life has become an almost continuous ecstasy. The reason for all this – I am going to marry Betty. She might laugh me to scorn if she heard that proclaimed, but I should have the love of a panther." Further evidence was given of Burton's disordered mental state over a length of time and of relations which he and his twin brother both had with a Belgian woman they had met on ship as they travelled to Britain. Betty May did not give evidence at the trial. Burton was found guilty of murder but insane and ordered to be detained "during the King's pleasure".

== Later life ==
In 1955 a notice was placed in a London newspaper by her publishers, Duckworth, seeking information about her: "TIGER WOMAN – Will "BETTY MAY" or anyone who knows her whereabouts since 1934 communicate by letter with her publishers..." Just two days later, the Daily Express published a story saying that Betty May had been "found". The Express reported that she was living in a "semi-basement bed-sitter in Luton Road, Chatham" and that "After she disappeared from London she 'went north.' she said. Then for three years after the war she camped out in a beauty spot. After that to her bed-sitter in Chatham" Virginia Nicholson writes of May "resurfacing" as Betty May Bailey after the Second World War and therefore a possible fifth marriage. May lived in Strood in her later years, and died from a heart attack at Medway Maritime Hospital in Gillingham on 5 May 1980, at the age of 85.

== Musical ==
As of 2014, a musical show, Betty May – Tiger Woman versus The Beast, is in production. Based on May's life story it contains 18 original songs written by Celine Hispiche with musical arrangements by Philippe Jakko. It is being produced by DeSapinaud Productions.

== Bibliography ==
- Epstein, Jacob (1940), Let There Be Sculpture, New York: Putnam
- May, Betty (1929), Tiger Woman: My Story, London: Duckworth (published 2014), ISBN 978-0715648551
- Nicholson, Virginia (2002), Among the Bohemians: Experiments in Living 1900–1939, London: Viking, ISBN 0670889660
