= Lilian Shelley =

British entertainer

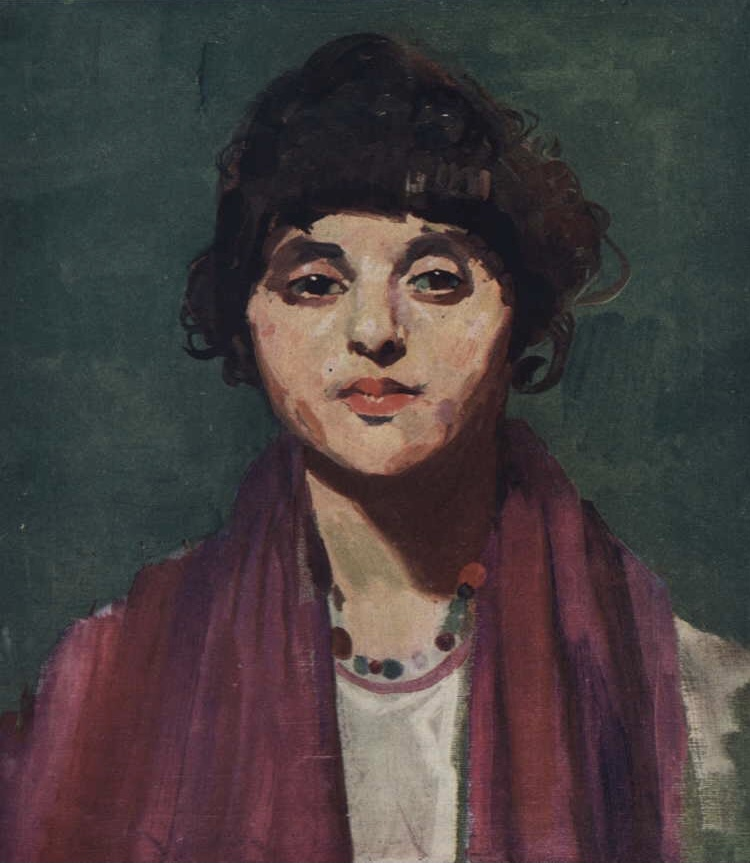
Shelley by J. P. Flanagan

Lilian Shelley (born Lilian Milsom 1892, died after 1933) was an artists' model, music hall entertainer, and cabaret singer in London in the 1910s and 1920s, known as "The Bug" or "The Pocket Edition". She posed for Jacob Epstein and Augustus John.

John's portrait of Shelley was described as one of the "star turns" in an exhibition Pictures of Women at the Wildenstein Galleries, London, in 1940.

== Early life ==
Lilian Shelley was born Lilian Milsom in a Bristol public house in 1892. She was baptized at St Barnabas Church, Bristol, on 1 July 1892, when her father, Albert Milsom, was described as a hotel proprietor, of the Gaiety Hotel, Christmas Steps. By the time her brother Albert was baptized at the same church in October 1894, the family was living at Woodwell House, St George's Road. According to later newspaper reports she had to teach herself to read and write. The 1901 United Kingdom census records the family living at 2, Christmas Steps, Bristol, with Albert Milsom, aged 34, a licensed victualler on his own account, his wife Mary, aged 32, Lilian, aged 8, and one son, Albert, aged 6. The birthplace of all four is given as Bristol. In the 1911 census, the older Albert is still living in Bristol and is listed as a public house manager, while the younger one, Shelley's brother, aged sixteen, is a publisher's reader. They are living with Shelley's grandfather, George Milsom, aged 69, described as an engineer fitter in a chocolate factory.

== Artist's model ==
Shelley got to know the painter James Dickson Innes, who came under the influence of Augustus John. Jacob Epstein later noted that he had met Shelley through John in 1910, in which year John had invited her to go with him on a tour of France, but she "had not turned up".

In 1911, Innes took Shelley to John's Welsh base at Penmachno. As far as is known, Innes did not paint Shelley, preferring landscapes, but he was such a poor figure painter that his subjects are not always identifiable. The fair-haired woman he did paint is most likely the model Euphemia Lamb. However, Augustus John did paint Shelley in 1911, showing her in a black dress, and the portrait was shown at the Alpine Club in 1917. She has been described as one of John's mistresses, and he called her "Bill". In 1934, Shelley recalled a long visit she had made to Spain with Augustus John.

Shelley also modelled for Jacob Kramer, in a work now thought to be lost.

The American art collector John Quinn remembered Shelley vividly from a spree in London in 1911, when she and Euphemia Lamb agreed to go with Quinn and Augustus John on a trip to France, but changed their minds. He later bought Epstein's bronze head for which she had been the model.

== Music hall and cabaret career ==
Shelley was a successful musical hall performer dubbed as "Crazy Lilian Shelley. The Merry, Mad, Magnetic Comedienne." She was known for "My Little Popsy-Wopsy", a popular Edwardian song, and "You Made Me Love You (I Didn't Want to Do It)" (1913) which had been popularised by Al Jolson. Shelley was represented by the Rolls-Darewski agency and appeared in London and regional shows with performers from the same stable such as American violinist Jay Whidden and George Clarke ("London's leading Dude"). In 1913/14 she toured in the revue Step This Way which appeared in Birmingham, Sheffield and Scotland, and probably elsewhere, as one of the main acts mentioned in the billing. She was one of the entertainers photographed by Walter Benington.

In the summer of 1914, Shelley sang in cabaret at the Cave of the Golden Calf in Heddon Street, founded by Madame Strindberg. The Sphere later noted that she had "… startled and thrilled her fashionable audiences by presenting what was then a completely new art to Londoners".

== Marriage ==
In 1914, Shelley married the artist John P. Flanagan in the Marylebone district of London, under her real name of Milsom. In 1916, the magazine Colour noted that its cover artist Cadet John P. Flanagan was serving at the Front in the Artists Rifles.

== Bohemian life ==
Shelley was a contemporary of the other artists' models Betty May, Euphemia Lamb, and Dolores, all of whom also posed for Epstein, and like Dolores she sang and danced at Madame Strindberg's The Cave of the Golden Calf (1912–1914). One of her jobs at the Cave was to visit the Savoy Hotel each evening to feed Madame Strindberg's monkey. According to Nina Hamnett, writing in 1932, Lilian Shelley and Betty May were the "principal supports" of the Crab Tree Club, which was started by Augustus John in 1913. There also, she would sing "Popsy-Wopsy", and David Garnett later recalled befriending her there.

Garnett's novel Dope Darling : A Story of Cocaine (1919), set during the First World War, tells the story of an affair between a young medical student and a night-club singer and drug addict called Claire Plowman. According to a biographer of Garnett, "Claire… bears a striking resemblance to Betty May, with a nod to Lillian Shelley."

In her Tiger Woman (1929), Betty May recalls Shelley as a regular at the Café Royal, where she was called "The Bug" or "The Pocket Edition", and the artist William Roberts recalled her arriving there 'flamboyant in leopard-skin coat and surrounded by an escort of admirers'.

Shelley was often seen in the company of the practical joker, Horace de Vere Cole, who maintained that a woman's nose was an indication of beauty and Shelley's could not be faulted. Many years later an article in Horizon recalled that

Lilian Milsom was a protégé of Horace Cole and was popularly known as 'Billy'. In the belief that she had a 'voice', Cole was having her trained as a singer. In due course she did appear, for a brief period, on the music-hall stage, where her performance, I thought, owed less to Art than to impudence.

Nina Hamnett described Shelley as "the craziest and most generous creature in the world", giving someone a piece of jewellery if they admired it. In 1915 M. J. Woddis described her appearance as "a Botticelli-looking person, with strangely cut black hair, which is adorned with a golden-embroidered head-band, a perfect model of an Egyptian goddess" while John Quinn wrote to Jacob Epstein in 1915 that Shelley was "a beautiful thing ... red lips and hair as black as a Turk's, stunning figure, great sense of humour".

In October 1920, Kinematograph Weekly commented that Alla Nazimova, the star of The Red Lantern, bore a remarkable resemblance to Shelley.

== Jacob Epstein figures ==
Jacob Epstein completed a head and a larger bust of Shelley. One was shown at the Grosvenor Gallery in Bond Street in 1916 and another at the Leicester Galleries in 1920. On one occasion, Shelley arrived at a gallery showing one of these works with a male friend who said to Epstein "Yes, I can see that you have depicted the vicious side of Lillian". Epstein answered that he thought the man knew Lilian better than he did. According to Epstein, the man was later "kicked to death in Cornwall by the miner father of a girl he had attempted to seduce."

== Later life and death ==
In 1923, William Collins published an autobiographical novel, Mary Bryant, a girl of the people. A novel, by Shelley. It told the story of a girl born in a Bristol slum who is led by an "indefinable yearning" to seek a more fulfilling life in London and Paris. A review of the book noted its "unusual presentation of Bohemian life". In an interview in The Pall Mall Gazette in September 1923, Shelley confirmed that the book was by her and that it detailed her astonishing career.

Shelley was still alive in September 1934, when she is recorded as a friend of Cecilia Hamilton who gave the artist Leonard Brooks "a couple of pounds" when he left London for Spain.

The exact date of her death is unknown, but according to Virginia Nicholson, "Lilian Shelley killed herself". Nick Rennison in Bohemian London (2017) says she was "... still modelling for Epstein in the early 1920s, but disappeared from view in the years to come and died, probably a suicide, in the 1930s."

== Selected depictions of Lilian Shelley ==
- Head of Lilian Shelley. Jacob Epstein.
- Bust of Lilian Shelley. Jacob Epstein, bronze, 1920.
- Lilian Shelley in Black Dress. Augustus John. (Shown at the Alpine Club, 1917)

== Gallery ==
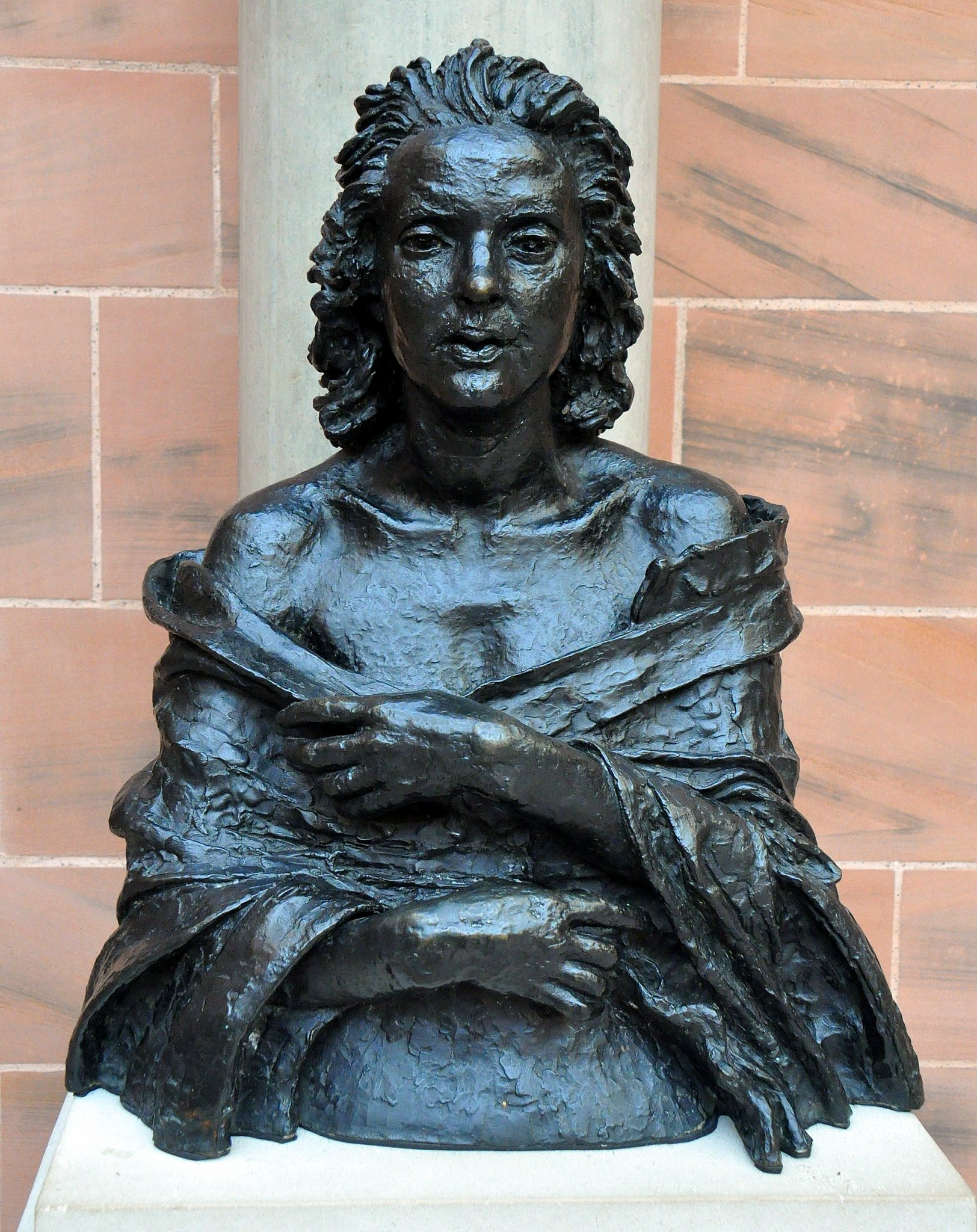
Lilian Shelley, bronze, 1920, by Sir Jacob Epstein. The Burrell Collection

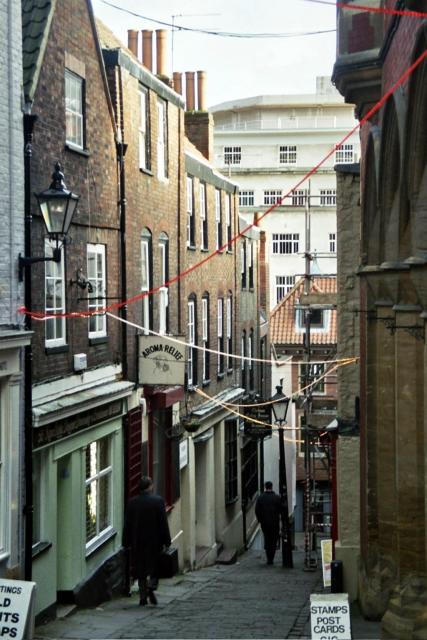
Christmas Steps, Bristol

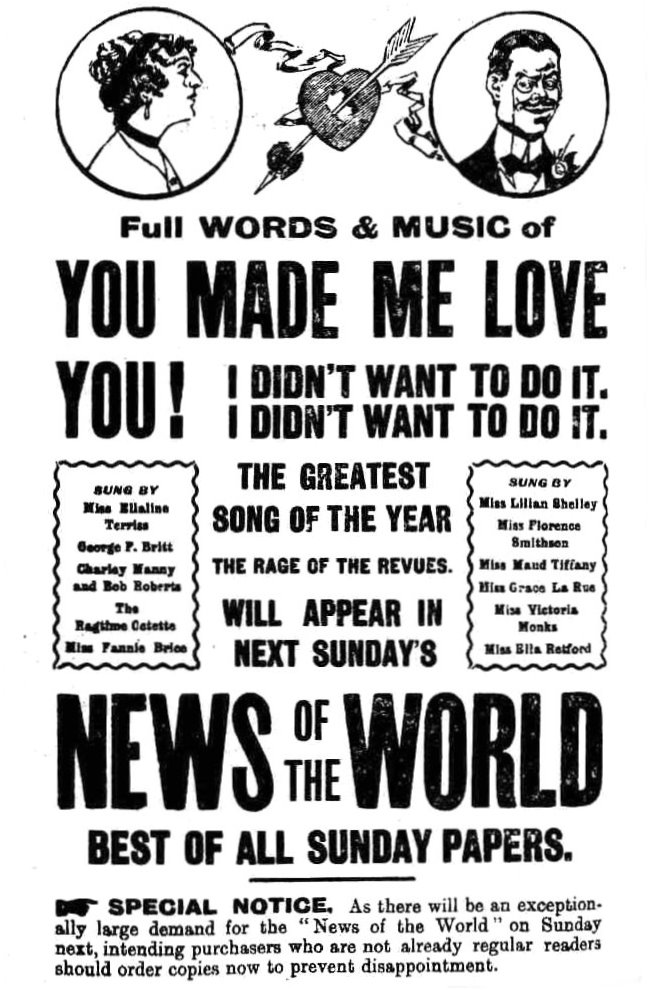
Shelley named as one of the performers of You Made Me Love You (1913)
