= Sunita Devi =

Indian art model (c. 1897–1932)

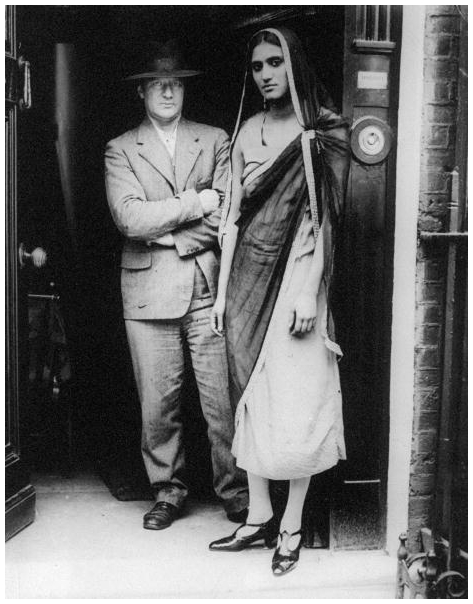
Sunita Devi and Jacob Epstein c. 1925

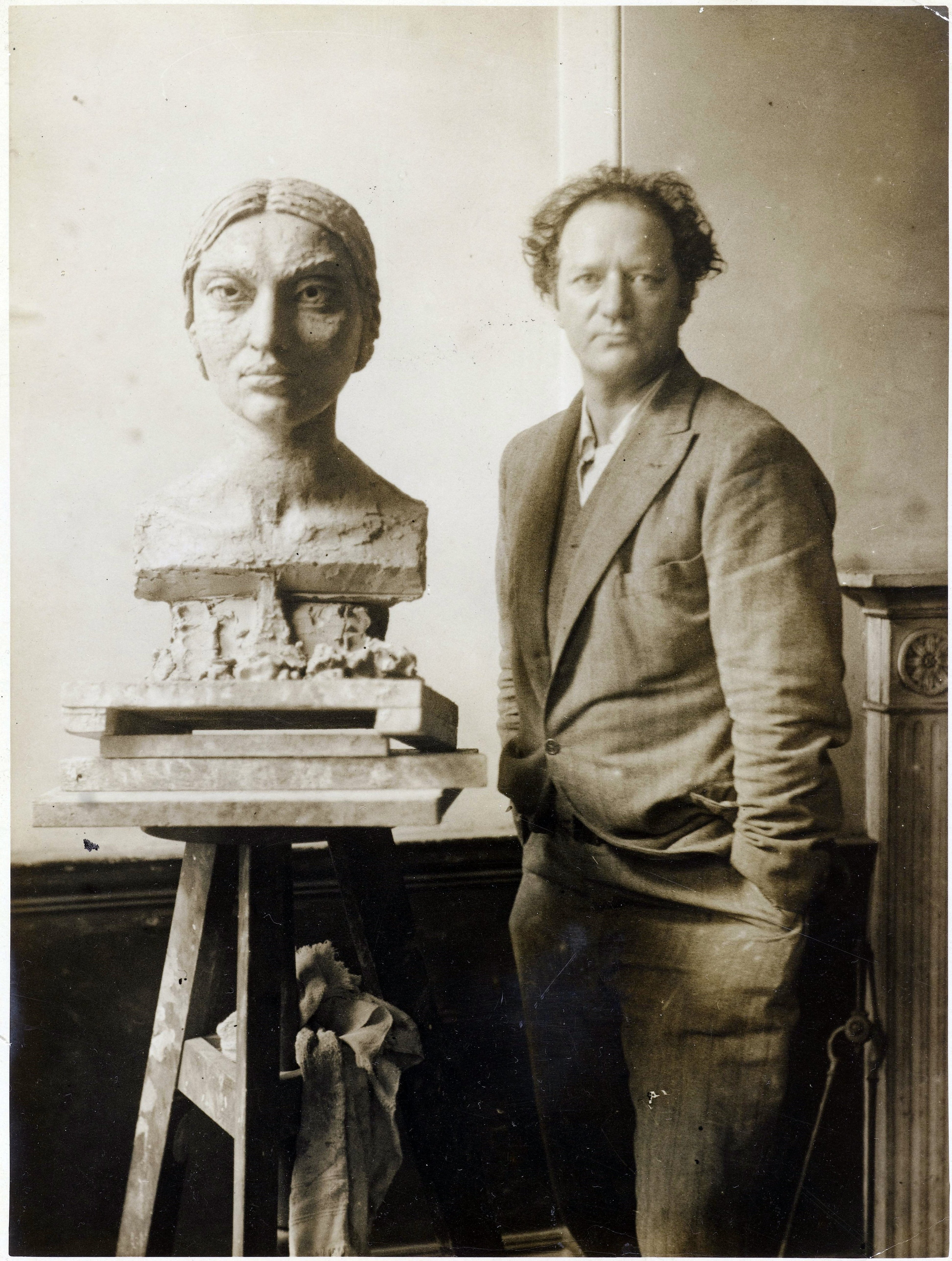
Jacob Epstein with his bust of Sunita, c. 1926.

Sunita Devi (c. 1897 – 3 November 1932), real name Armina Peerbhoy, generally known just as Sunita, was a model for the sculptor Jacob Epstein in London. Her death in India on 3 November 1932 was believed by some to be a political assassination.

== Early life ==
Originally from Kashmir, Sunita was a Muslim who married Ahmed Peerbhoy, a millionaire of Bombay, but some time in the early 1920s went to England with her son Enver and younger sister Anita Patel, who had also left her husband. The sisters joined a troupe of magicians known as the Maysculine Brothers. Sunita performed a stunt that involved sitting in a tank of water fully submerged for five minutes (with the aid of a transparent air hose). They also had a stand selling erotic trinkets at the British Empire Exhibition (1924 to 1925). Sunita developed a persona as an Indian mystic and fortune teller and became known as Princess Sunita.

== Matthew Smith ==
Sunita posed for the artist Matthew Smith from 1924. Their relationship became more than just artist and model. Smith drew her in 1924 and painted her in The Red Sari, Sunita Reclining, and The Black Sari, Sunita Wearing a Black Sari.

== Jacob Epstein ==
Jacob Epstein may have met Sunita at the British Empire Exhibition, where the exotic foreign displays intrigued him, or possibly through his friend Matthew Smith. In 1925 Epstein invited Sunita, Enver and Anita to live at his home at Guilford Street in London with the agreement of his wife Margaret. Mrs Epstein was trying to end her husband's affair with Kathleen Garman by encouraging him into affairs with other women. Dolores, who Mrs Epstein had hoped in vain would tempt her husband away from Kathleen, had recently left the house and now there were two new women that might do the job. It is unclear, however, whether Epstein had any romantic interest in either sister.

Epstein sculpted Enver's head in 1926 and 1927 (twice) and heads of Sunita three times in 1926. Sunita and Enver were the models for Epstein's sculpture of Madonna and Child (1927), though Epstein had great difficulty getting Enver to stand still, which he said was responsible for the relatively unfinished modelling of the boy in the work. Epstein thought Sunita beautiful but Joseph Duveen, on seeing Madonna and Child for the first time, asked, "Why did you not choose a beautiful model?" In addition to the sculpture, there were over 100 drawings and watercolours of Sunita, Enver, and Anita.

== Death ==
In 1931 Sunita returned to India, saying, according to the American press, "I am going to my death; I know it is so". In 1932 it was reported that she had died of "intestinal inflammation". Those who knew her outside India believed that she had been poisoned and that her closeness to participants in the Round Table Conferences had meant that she was seen as a spy.

== See also ==
- Betty May
- Lilian Shelley
