= Friedrich Strindberg =

Friedrich Strindberg, also Friedrich Strindberg-Wedekind, pseudonym Fredrik Uhlson, (21 August 1897 in Vienna – 30 March 1978 in Italy) was a Swedish-Austrian journalist and author.

He was the second child of Frida Uhl and the grandson of Friedrich Uhl. Frank Wedekind was his biological father. His mother was at the time still married to August Strindberg, who juridically accepted the boy as his son. He was born and brought up in Austria.

== Early years ==
Friedrich Strindberg grew up with his grandmother in Schloss Dornach, Saxen, Upper Austria. After volunteering in the Austrian army in the First World War, he returned to his birth town Vienna, where he in 1923 married the writer and playwright Maria Lazar. The couple had a daughter, Judith, born in 1924. Their marriage was dissolved in 1927.

Strindberg worked as a freelance journalist for the Ullstein publishing house and for various newspapers. He reported from both Mussolini´s Abyssinian campaign and the Spanish Civil War.

== Fleeing to Sweden ==
Friedrich Strindberg was an active anti-Nazi and had to flee to Sweden in 1943. August Strindberg's Swedish heirs wanted to prevent this and tried to revoke his Swedish citizenship. This could have ended fatally for Friedrich Strindberg, as his biological father Frank Wedekind incorrectly had been declared "half-Jewish" by the Nuremberg laws in Nazi Germany.

== Work in Exile ==
Reportedly Friedrich Strindberg was one of the first journalists who knew of Hitler's deportations to Concentration camps and the gas chambers. In Sweden he started writing Under jorden i Berlin (Under ground in Berlin). The novel was released under the pseudonym Fredrik Uhlson in February 1945, making it the first published fictional work about the Holocaust. The heroes of the novel are a subsidiary rabbi and his girlfriend, who at the very last moment learn the Gestapo wants to contain them, and immediately go underground. The role models of these characters are Herbert and Lotte Strauss, who themselves covered their experiences in the Third Reich in their memoir volumes. Friedrich Strindberg appears in their works as a Swedish photographer who informs the pair about the atrocities of the Nazis.

== Life in West Germany and Italy ==
In 1949 Friedrich Strindberg left Sweden and re-settled in Germany. In 1957 he was head of the text editorial office of Weltbild, in 1961 of Quick. In the mid 1960s on retirement from full-time work he moved to Italy, where he worked as a foreign correspondent for Quick and wrote the novel Wenn die Birnen Reifen which came out the year before his death.

== Legacy ==
Friedrich Strindberg is together with his second wife Utje posthumously honored as Righteous Among the Nations. His name is also immortalized on the Yad Vashem memorial in Israel.
