= Euphemia Lamb =

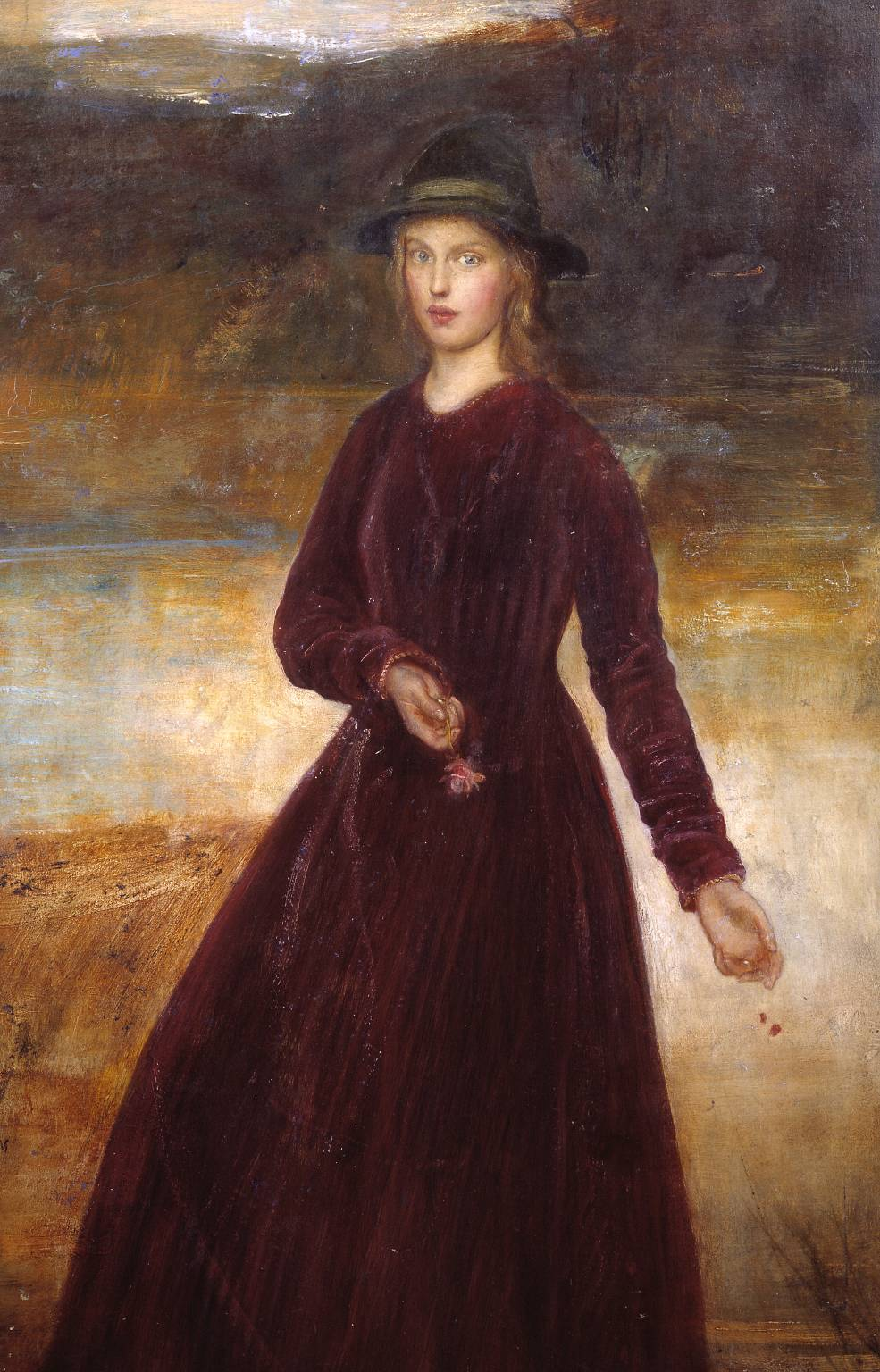
- Euphemia by Ambrose McEvoy, oil on canvas, 1909, Tate Gallery.
- Born: Annie Euphemia Forrest; 1887; Ormskirk, Lancashire, England
- Died: 1957 (aged 69–70)
- Known for: Artist's model

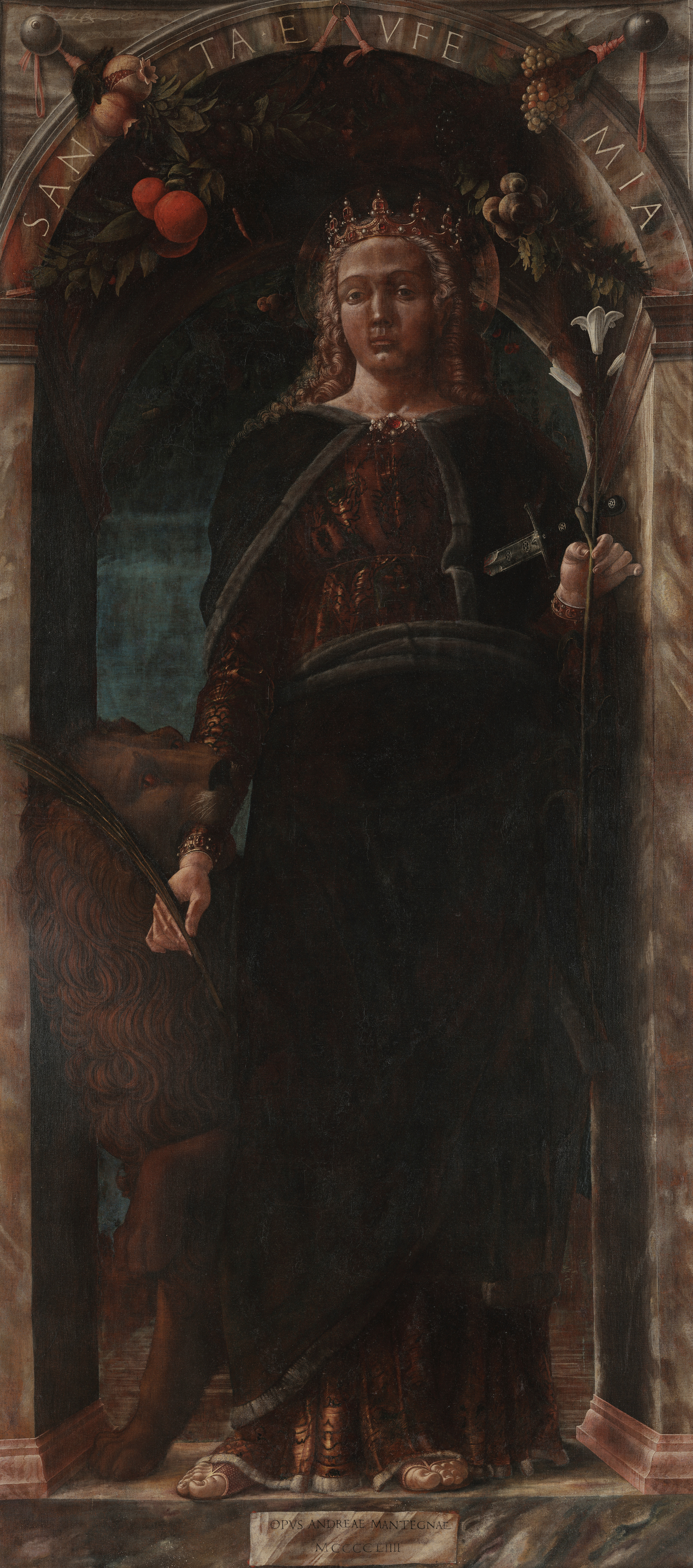
Saint Euphemia, Andrea Mantegna, tempera on canvas, 1454

Euphemia Lamb (née Annie Euphemia Forrest; 1887 – 1957) was an English artists' model and the wife of painter Henry Lamb. She modelled for Augustus John and Jacob Epstein and came to exemplify the sexual freedom of the bohemian lifestyle of the early twentieth century.

Henry Lamb called her Euphemia, by which name she was generally known. John Maynard Keynes commented that Euphemia had more of a sex life "than the rest of us put together". She was one of the lovers of the occultist Aleister Crowley.

== Early life ==
Forrest was born in 1887 in Ormskirk, Lancashire, England, as Annie Euphemia Forrest, the daughter of Arthur Forrest. She was married under the name Nina Euphemia Forrest in 1906. She claimed that she was born on a steamship bound for Bombay, but there is no independent verification of this, and her birth was registered in Lancashire. Her middle name was actually Euphemia, casting doubt on the claim that she got this name because Henry Lamb perceived in her a likeness to Saint Euphemia. She was raised in Greenheys, a poor district of Manchester known as a centre for prostitution. Her working-class accent, however, was not to everyone's taste, and Viva King, another bohemian, said of one of Jacob Epstein's busts of Euphemia, "I fancy I can hear, through the open mouth, her ugly voice".

== Henry Lamb ==
Nina Forrest met the Australian-born Henry Lamb in 1905 in Manchester, where he was at medical school. They left for London as soon as they could. Henry enrolled at the Chelsea School of Art that had recently been established by Augustus John and William Orpen and they attended the Friday Club run by Vanessa Stephen. Supposedly, Henry renamed Nina "Euphemia" because she reminded him of Saint Euphemia in the painting by Andrea Mantegna They married in May 1906 after she became pregnant, but she lost the baby due to a miscarriage.

== Artists' model ==
Euphemia was one of the models who networked at the Café Royal before the First World War, occupying a grey area between professional model and prostitute. Her contemporaries included Betty May, Dolores, and Lilian Shelley, along with many other young women. She was slim, pale, and fair-haired and apparently able to adopt any pose that might be asked of her. Her husky voice and slightly androgynous appearance meant that she could pass for a young man, which she sometimes did. Augustus John commented to Henry Lamb, "she makes an irresistible boy".

== Augustus John ==
In March 1907, Euphemia and Henry Lamb went to Paris to stay with Augustus John and Dorelia McNeill at Montparnasse. Henry had been John's pupil in London, and Euphemia modelled for John. John was fascinated by Euphemia's appearance and her sexual behaviour, and he nicknamed her "Lobelia", a name he used quite openly with her husband. Dorelia became romantically interested in Henry, which John encouraged so that he could spend more time with Euphemia, though he denied any personal romantic interest in her.

Although John prized Euphemia as a model, he did not take her seriously otherwise, regarding her behaviour as quite eccentric and her stories fanciful. On one occasion, according to Euphemia, her penchant for dressing like a man had unfortunate consequences, she and John were arrested as homosexuals and she was required to undress in custody in order to prove she was a woman. She also claimed that she had a revolver and was prepared to shoot herself and her husband, and that she had caused the death of John's first wife Ida who had died in childbirth.

Battles with Henry forced Euphemia in the direction of Duncan Grant, whose relationships were usually homosexual, but he was repulsed by the complicated love life of the group, particularly John's encouragement of Dorelia's relationship with Henry, writing to Lytton Strachey, "That Lamb family sickens me", and referring to Euphemia as "the white haired whore". By the summer of 1907, Euphemia had effectively left Henry, although they did not divorce until 1928 when Henry wished to marry Pansy Pakenham.

John continued to follow Euphemia's liaisons with interest, reporting to Henry in August that Euphemia had "made the acquaintance of a number of nations" and the following year to Dorelia that "Lobelia had 6 men in her room last night, representing the six European powers".

== Jacob Epstein ==
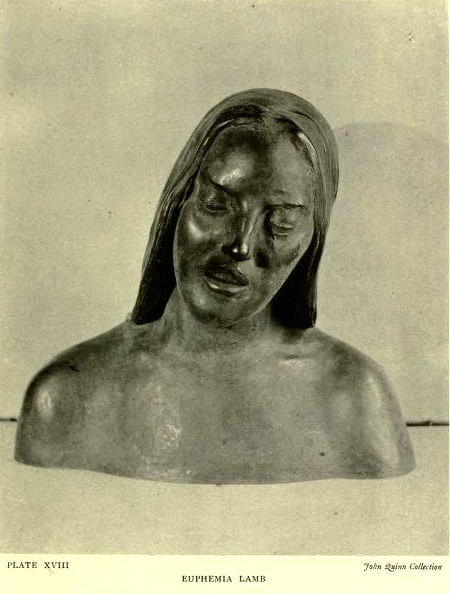
Jacob Epstein's 1908 (or 1911) bust of Euphemia Lamb, John Quinn collection

The sculptor Jacob Epstein created a number of busts of Euphemia in marble and bronze, the best known of which is the bronze bust in the Tate Gallery which the gallery dates to 1908, but which Epstein dated to 1911 in Let There Be Sculpture. Three studies of Euphemia are in the Leeds City Art Gallery.

Around 1910, Epstein completed for Lady Ottoline Morrell a garden figure of 53 inches (1,300 mm) for which Euphemia was the model. A plaster model of the work was exhibited in 1911 and a bronze of the torso completed in 1912.

== Aleister Crowley ==
In Paris, Euphemia became the lover of the occultist Aleister Crowley; in 1908 they conspired to humiliate Crowley's male lover and acolyte Victor Neuburg by convincing him that Euphemia was in love with him while Crowley pressed him into visiting a brothel, thus making him unfaithful to her. Crowley gave Euphemia the name "Dorothy" in his Confessions and described her as "incomparably beautiful ... capable of stimulating the greatest extravagances of passion".

== James Dickson Innes ==
In 1910, Euphemia met James Dickson Innes (1887–1914) at a cafe on the Boulevard du Montparnasse, and the two began an affair which was more intense for Innes than for Euphemia who never restricted her relationships to just one man. According to Euphemia, they travelled through southern France together. Innes was already suffering from the tuberculosis that eventually killed him. In 1910 or 1911, with Augustus John, he established a small artistic commune at Nant Ddu cottage in north Wales. Visitors included John and Dorelia, Derwent Lees, Ian Strang, and Euphemia, who Innes painted against the background of Arenig Fawr. It was said that when the relationship was over, Innes buried a silver casket of love letters from Euphemia on the summit of Arenig, the mountain in some way representing the scale of Innes' unrequited love for her.

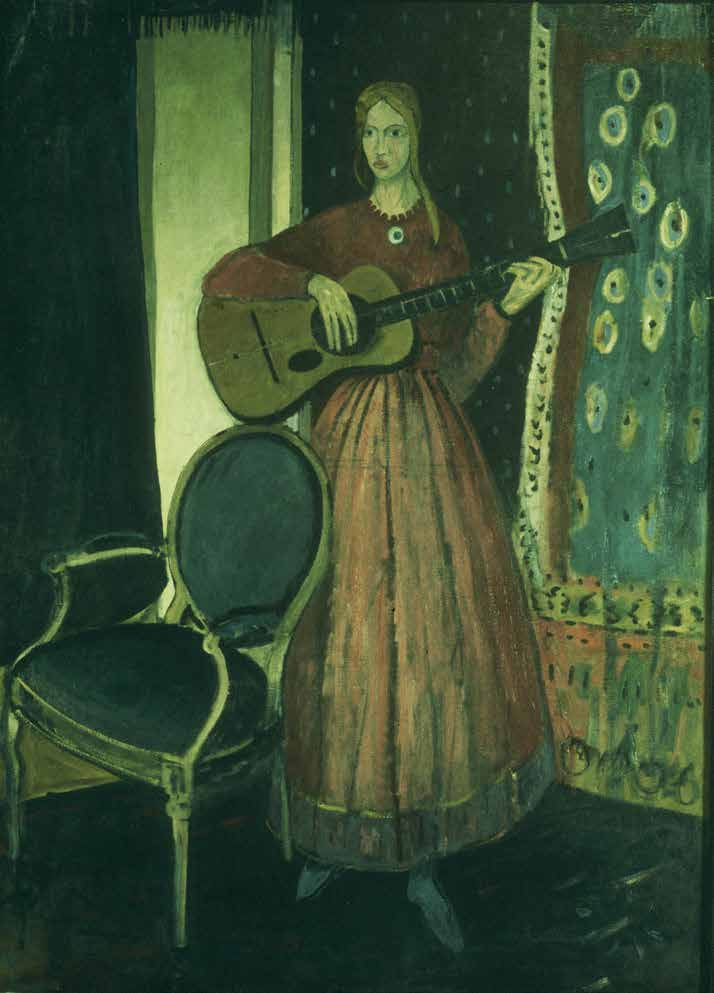
Euphemia as Girl with a Guitar, James Dickson Innes, oil on canvas, c. 1910.

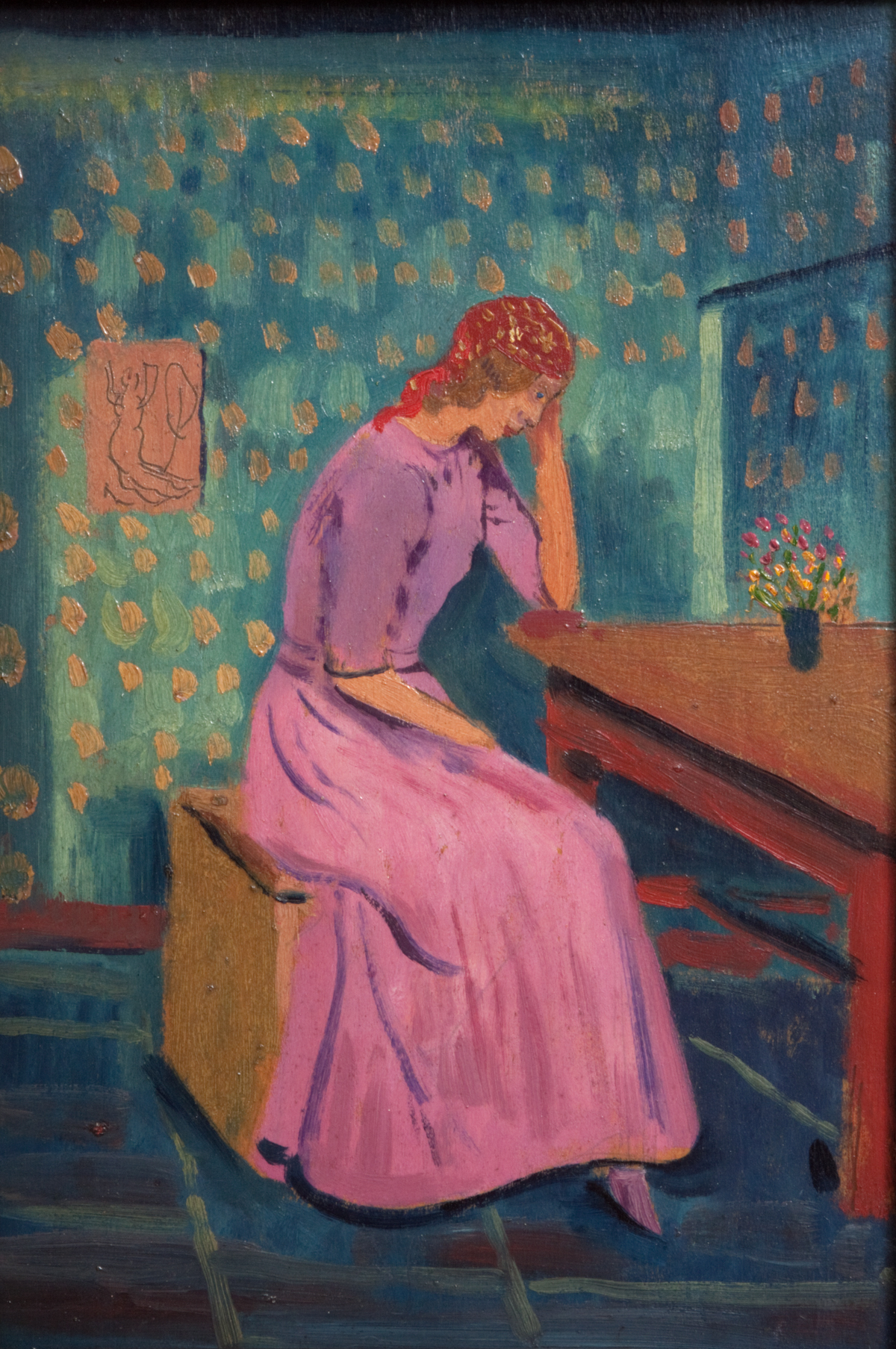
The Girl in the Cottage, James Dickson Innes, oil on panel, c. 1911.

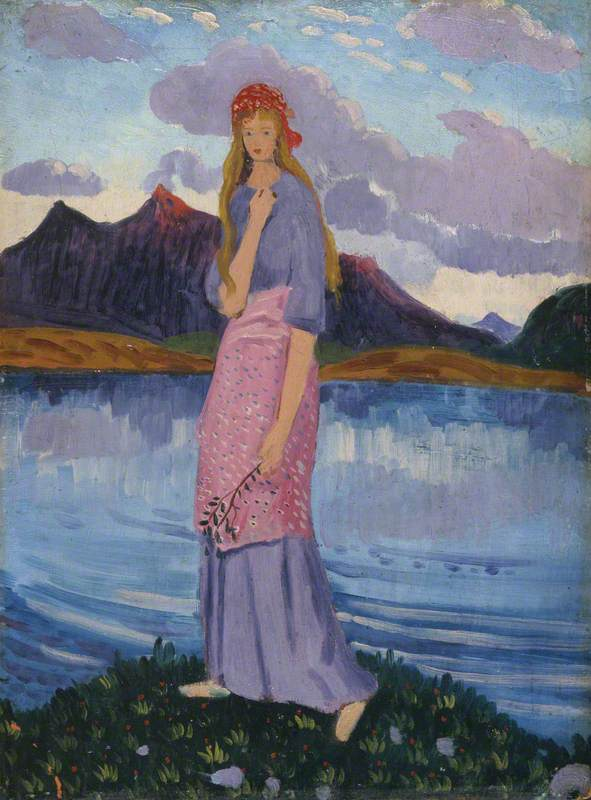
Girl Standing by a Lake, James Dickson Innes, oil on panel, 1911/12. Ex Augustus John.

== Affairs ==
Among Euphemia's other lovers were the poet Francis Macnamara (poet) and the author Henri-Pierre Roché.

== Later life ==
Little is recorded about Euphemia's later life. She was living at Stoke House in Stoke Mary Bourne, Hampshire at least by 1939, and it was her address at the time of her death and recorded in the Probate Index, which shows her effects valued at nearly 37,000 pounds. In 1934, she married the painter Edward Grove (artist), but they divorced in 1942 or 1943. Euphemia died on 26 January 1957 in hospital at Winchester.

== See also ==
- Lilian Shelley
