= Stewart Gray =

Scottish advocate, artist, and campaigner

Alexander Stewart Gray
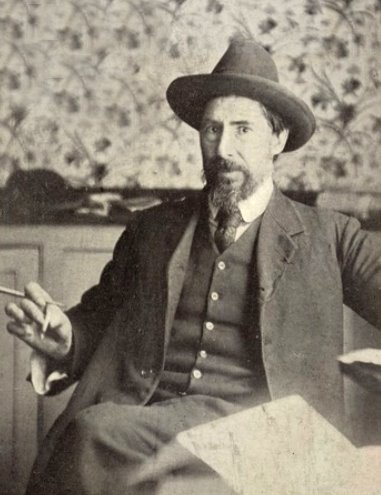
- Born: Alexander Stewart Gray; 17 May 1862; Prestonkirk, East Lothian, Scotland
- Died: 13 April 1937 (aged 74); Ashingdon, Essex, England
- Occupation: Lawyer

Alexander Stewart Gray (17 May 1862 – 13 April 1937) was a Scottish advocate, artist, and campaigner against unemployment. He led a "hunger march", fasted outside Windsor Castle, and created an artist's colony near Regent's Park.

== Early life ==
Alexander Stewart Gray (known as Stewart) was the fifth of eleven children of William Gray (1829–1909) and Helen Marshall Stewart (1835–1904), who were tenant farmers at Brownrigg Farm, North Berwick, East Lothian. His mother had her own income, but spent most of it on the children's education. Several of his sisters had good careers. Agnes Grainger Gray (1858–1940) became headmistress of Sandecotes School, Parkstone, Dorset; Jessy MacDonald Stewart Wallace (1867–1937) became an Inspector of Workshops in Islington; Charlotte Jane Andrews (1872–1942) became an established artist of the Scottish Colourist school, and painted alongside Samuel Peploe in France and Spain. The youngest child, Hugh Stewart Gray (1875–1955), married Hilda Orchardson in 1905 (the daughter of the artist Sir William Quiller Orchardson) and became a farmer in South Africa.

Alexander Stewart Gray became a solicitor in Edinburgh where he was involved in the flotation of companies on the Stock Market, including the Provost Oats Company, a well-known company at the time. He mismanaged some family finances, and his mother lost all her personal income. He abandoned his work as a solicitor - perhaps being disbarred for embezzlement - and took to politics.

== Activism ==
In the early 1900s, Gray rejected his middle class existence to campaign against unemployment and poverty. Jack Kahane, who knew him, described Gray in his Memoirs of a Booklegger (1939) as "shocked out of a comfortable life by the spectacle of starvation", a "heroic dreamer", and an eccentric who wore a sombrero and had "school-boyish and impracticable" ideas. Between 1906 and 1910 he achieved a national profile as a political activist and was seldom out of the newspapers for his various campaigns which were reported in detail by The Manchester Guardian and The Times. His activities included the seizure of public land in order for the unemployed to grow vegetables, various public protests and stunts, a hunger strike and a hunger march.

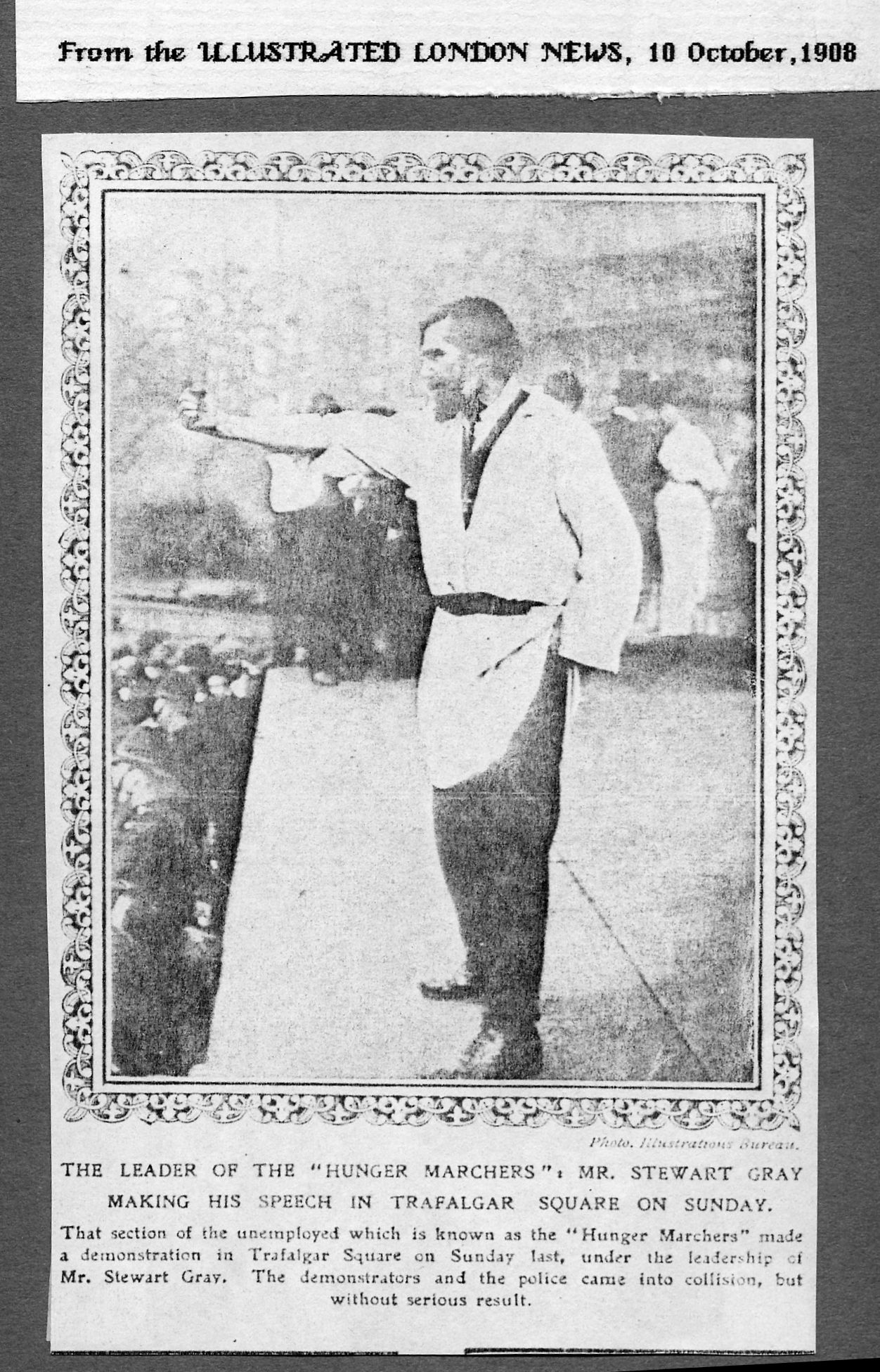
Stewart Gray leader of Hunger Marchers. Illustrated London News 10 October 1908, scanned from family album.

Gray was the originator of the "back-to-the-land movement" in the UK. The slogans associated with him were "Link Idle Land to Idle Labour; Free the Land, and you Free the People; Landlordism is Present-day SLAVERY".

== 8 Ormonde Terrace ==
Stewart Gray, and wife (centre), appear in William Roberts' The Toe Dancer, 1914.

Shortly before the start of the First World War, Gray took over 8 Ormonde Terrace in London, a largish house which overlooks Primrose Hill and is immediately to the north of Regent's Park. Gray is sometimes described as "squatting" in the house, perhaps because the facilities were so basic that it had the appearance of a squat, but according to Alice Mayes, Gray took a short lease with the help of Augustus John. John's involvement is confirmed in his letters, where he describes the idea of using 8 Ormonde Terrace as a centre for artists as a "scheme" with a "committee" of which he was asked to be the leader, a position he refused. John painted a portrait of Gray, entitled "Interpretation of Author", which was the picture of the year at the Royal Academy.

Alice Mayes was a dancer for Kosslov's Ballet Company, and later David Bomberg's first wife, and she and Bomberg were both early inhabitants of the house. Gray was a regular at the Harlequin Club and word quickly got around among the penniless bohemians of London that they could live at Ormonde Terrace for nothing, or almost nothing, and many artists and their models used the house, coming and going as they pleased, and turning it into a form of artist's colony.

Betty May and her husband Bunny lived there for six months in 1914 immediately after they married. May recalled in her autobiography Tiger Woman that the house was furnished to the minimum possible standard and that due to Gray's refusal to pay utility bills, the house was without services. Even the water had been cut off. May wrote that "The colony was divided into households, but the habit of borrowing resulted in something like what communism ought to be." According to May, Gray wore a beard to disguise the fact that he did not wear a collar, and although he was forced to wear boots around town, which he otherwise would not have done, he went without socks and bootlaces.

The sculptor Jacob Epstein attended life drawing classes there and remembered: "This refuge was without gas or electric light, so that candles were used, and it seldom had water. No room had a lock, as most of the metal work had been carried away ... Whether Stuart Gray ever received any rent was a question; but the old man, who resembled a Tolstoy gone wrong, would prowl about at night in a godfatherly fashion and look over his young charges."

The young William Roberts also lived at Ormonde Terrace, and Gray appears twice in Roberts's 1914 drawing The Toe Dancer which, according to the catalogue of Roberts's 1965 Tate Gallery retrospective, was inspired by the dances performed by Gray's wife there. Mrs Gray is the contorted figure in the centre of the drawing. The Toe Dancer is now in the Victoria and Albert Museum. In an essay published posthumously, Roberts remembered that "At the rear of the house on a level with the first floor landing was a small glass conservatory, that Stuart had filled with hay almost to the roof, on which he slept fully dressed." Augustus John described Gray as "a dear old humorist with a passion for vegetables".

Betty May wrote that the First World War broke up the colony but William Roberts remembers a man taking Gray's place and demanding that residents pay rent for the first time, causing at least Bomberg to leave.

== Family ==
Gray married Aida Forbes, a childhood friend who had often stayed at Brownrigg. He left her soon after the birth of their first child, Agness (Nansie), in 1900. He returned for a short time, but left before the birth of their second child, Dorothea Helen Forbes, in 1905.(Dorothea later became a tutor in classics at St Hugh's College, Oxford.) Aida Forbes' mother said she would maintain the family provided Aida never saw Stewart again. They were divorced. Jack Kahane reports in his memoir that when he knew Gray during his hunger march days (1906–10), Gray was separated from his wife who lived in Cannes in "luxurious circumstances". This "wife" was presumably a second marriage, or a mistress. It is unclear whether the "wife" pictured in the William Roberts drawing of 1914, The Toe Dancer, is the same person.

== Later life ==
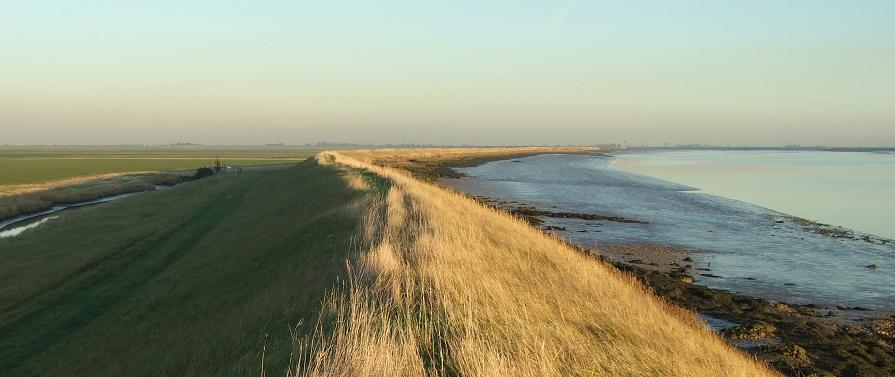
View of Wallasea Island.

Virginia Nicholson writes that after Ormonde Terrace, Gray lived and painted in Kathleen Hale's basement and converted to spiritualism. Hale had been Augustus John's secretary after moving to London in 1917 and probably met Gray through John. While still in London, Gray would visit the Harlequin Club and offer to draw customers' portraits for pennies.

According to Jacob Epstein in Let There be Sculpture, under the guidance of Bomberg, Gray "became a painter, gathering his materials where he could and painting on old bits of rag. But he had no talent and finally went off to become "king" of some Utopian colony on an island where he reared another family." The island was Wallasea, near Burnham-on-Crouch, Essex, where Gray lived in a cottage whose walls and ceilings he had painted with frescoes. His work attracted the attention of Augustus John. Even now, Wallasea is noted for its isolation.

Gray died in Ashingdon, near Rochford, Essex, on 13 April 1937. He was buried in pauper's grave, but the Gray family and others raised money for a tombstone.

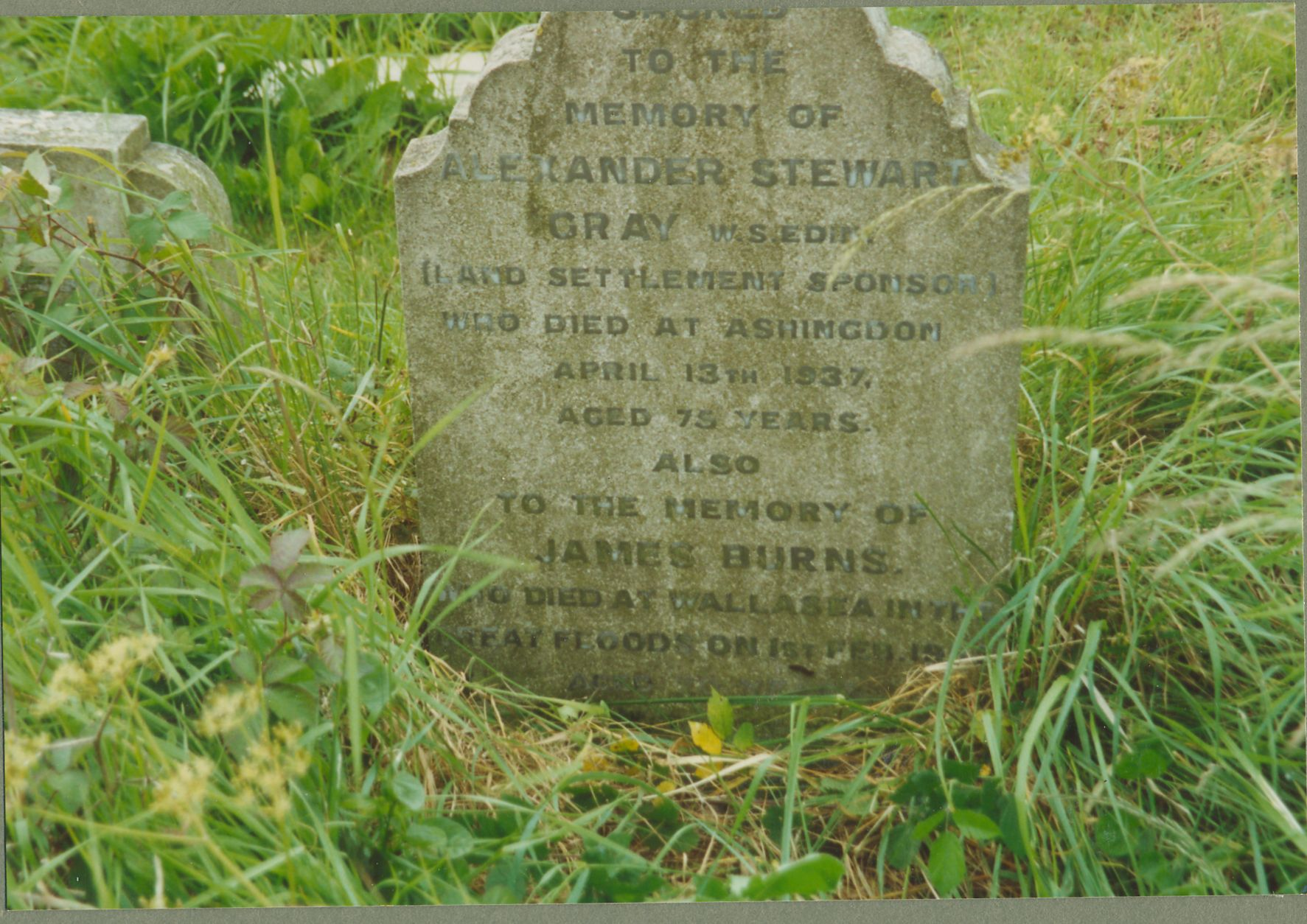
Photograph of the grave of Stewart Gray at Ashingdon, scanned from family album.
