= James Dickson Innes =

British painter (1887–1914)

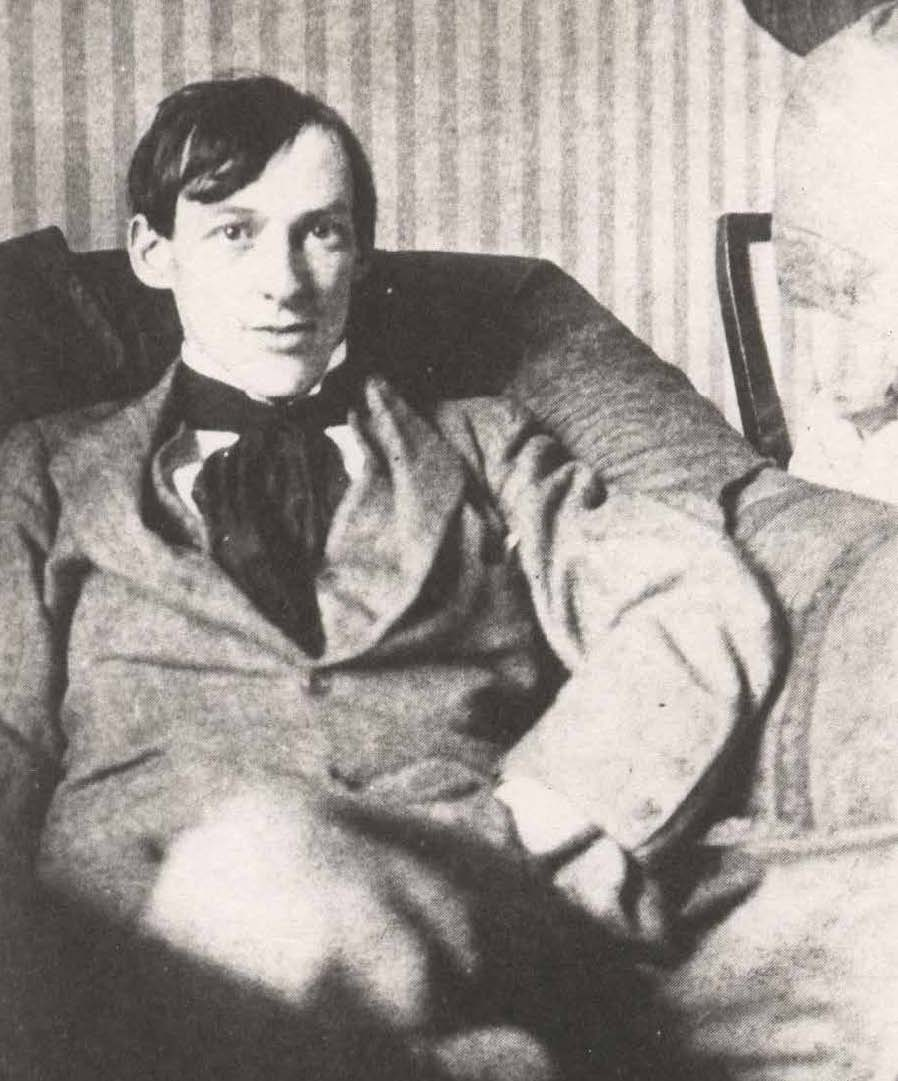
- Born: 27 February 1887; Llanelli, Carmarthenshire, Wales
- Died: 22 August 1914 (aged 27); Swanley, Kent, United Kingdom
- Occupation: Painter
- Years active: 1904–1914

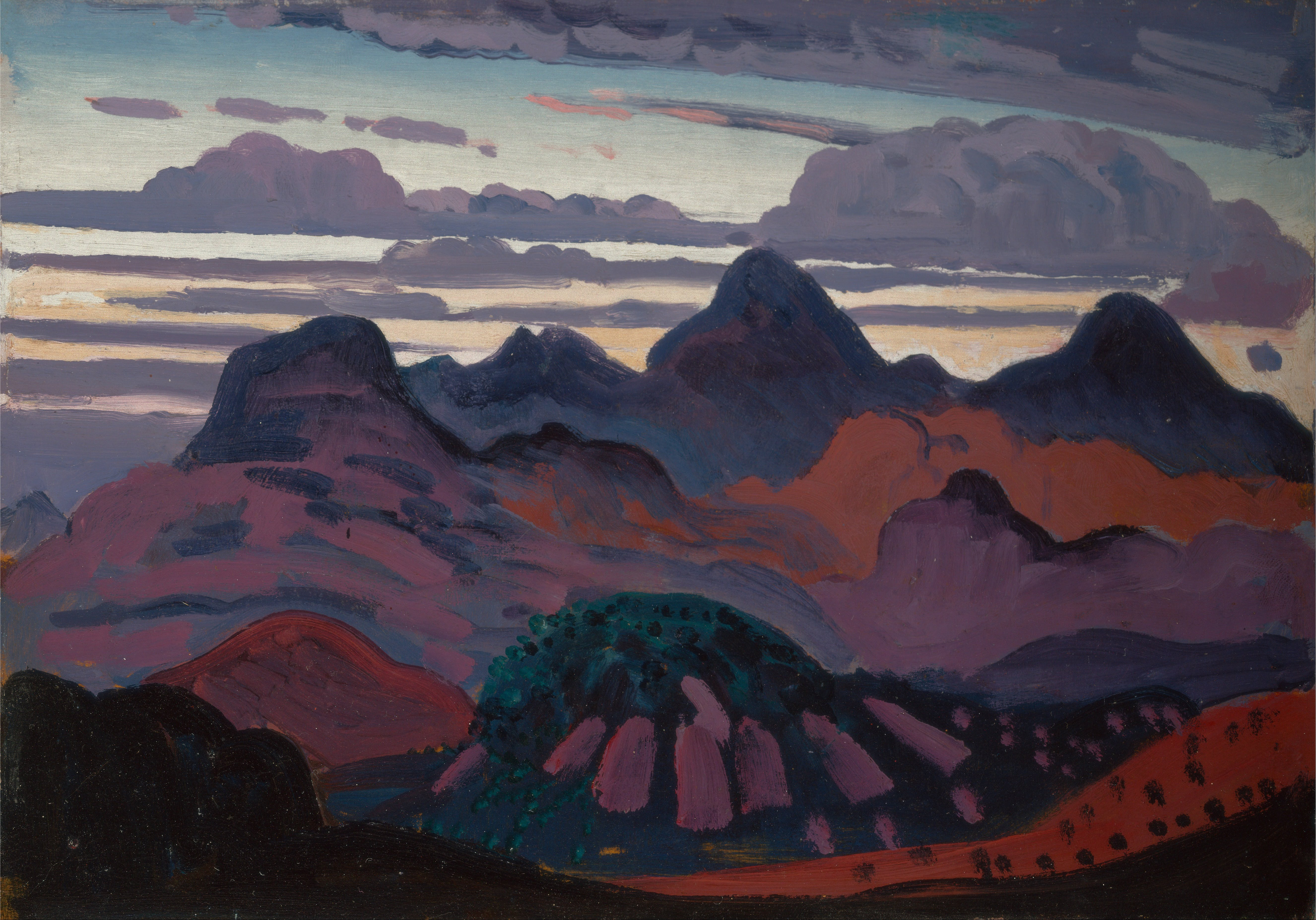
The Moelwyns from Llan Ffestiniog (1912 or 1913)

James Dickson Innes (27 February 1887 – 22 August 1914) was a Welsh painter, mainly of mountain landscapes but occasionally of figure subjects. He worked in both oils and watercolours.

== Style ==
Of his style, art historian David Fraser Jenkins wrote: "Like that of the fauves in France and the expressionists in Germany, the style of his work is primitive: it is child-like in technique and is associated with the landscape of remote places."

== Biography ==
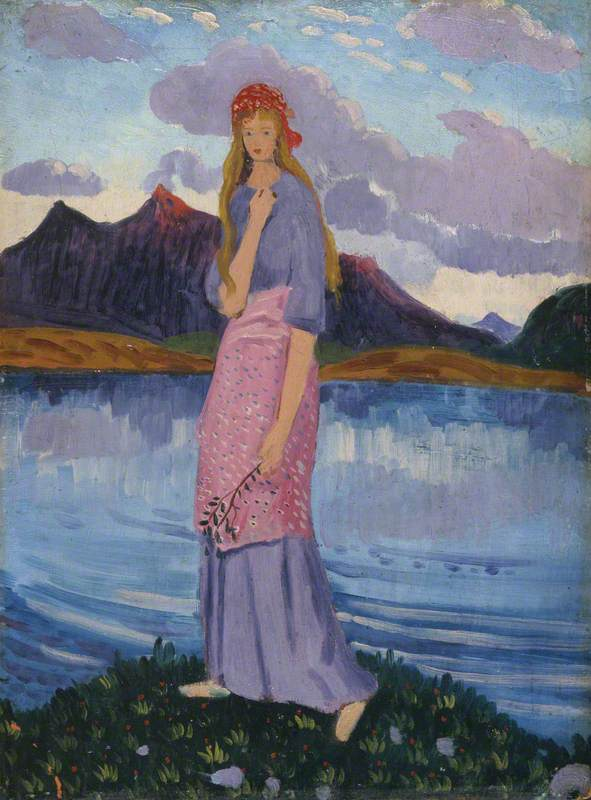
Girl Standing by a Lake, oil on panel, 1911/12. Possibly depicting Euphemia Lamb.

James Dickson Innes was born on 27 February 1887 in Llanelli, in south Wales. His father, John Innes, who had come from Scotland, was an historian and had an interest in a local brass and copper works; his mother was of Catalan descent. He had two brothers, Alfred and Jack.

His parents sent him to be educated at Christ College, Brecon. Afterwards he studied at the Carmarthen School of Art (1904–05), from where he won a scholarship to the Slade School of Art in London (1905–1908). His teachers at the Slade included Henry Tonks and P. Wilson Steer.

From 1907 he exhibited with the New English Art Club; and in 1911 he became a member of the Camden Town Group. The Camden Town Group included Walter Sickert who was an influence on Innes's art, and Augustus John with whom Innes became friends.

In 1911 Innes had a two-man exhibition with Eric Gill at the Chenil Gallery, London: "Sculptures by Mr Eric Gill and Landscapes by Mr J. D. Innes", Innes also exhibited in the influential Armory Show in New York City, Chicago and Boston. The Welsh politician and philanthropist Winifred Coombe Tennant (1874–1956) was an important patron of his work.

In 1911 and 1912 he spent some time painting with Augustus John around Arenig Fawr in the Arenig valley in North Wales; John describes him thus in his memoirs, Chiaroscuro:

He himself cut an arresting figure: a Quaker hat, a coloured silk scarf, and a long black overcoat, set off features of a slightly cadaverous cast, with glittering black eyes, a wide sardonic mouth, a prominent nose and a large bony forehead, invaded by streaks of thin black hair. He carried an ebony cane with a gold top, and spoke with a heavy English accent, which had been imposed on an agreeable Welsh sub-stratum.

Much of his work was done overseas, mainly in France (1908–1913), notably at Collioure, but also in Spain (1913) and Morocco (1913) – foreign travel having been prescribed after he was diagnosed with tuberculosis. On 22 August 1914, at the age of twenty-seven, he died of the disease at a nursing home in Swanley, Kent.

== Legacy ==
Innes was unusual for a British artist of that time, because of his bold painting style, more attuned to the French Post-Impressionists. It has been argued his unusual style led the way for British artists such as David Hockney.

In 2014 an exhibition of Innes' works was staged at the National Museum of Wales, Cardiff.

== Select works ==
- The Seine at Caudebec (1908)
- Thunder in the Mountains (1910)
- The Waterfall (1910) (Tate Gallery, London)
- Moorland Landscape with Sunset, Collioure (c. 1910) (Winnipeg Art Gallery)
- The Cathedral at Elne (1911) (National Museum Cardiff)
- Tryweryn Valley (1911) (Parc Howard Museum, Llanelli)
- Bala Lake (1911)
- Ranunculus (1912) (Walker Art Gallery, Liverpool)
- Arenig, North Wales (1913) (Tate Gallery, London)
- Arenig, North Wales (1913) (Casa Cuseni, Taormina Fine Art Museum)
- Inkwell and Pens (Museum of Modern Art Wales, Machynlleth)

== Media ==
In 2011 Innes and Augustus John's fascination with painting Arenig Fawr and the Arenig valley was the subject of a BBC Four documentary titled The Mountain That Had to Be Painted.
