= Guilford Street =

Street in Bloomsbury, London

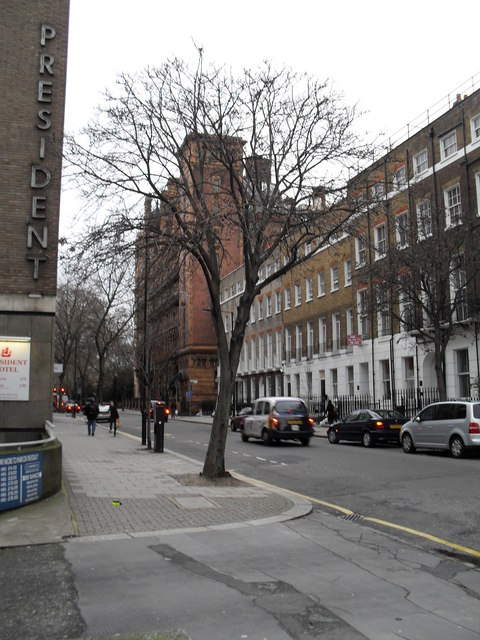
- Looking west along Guilford Street
- Length: 0.4 mi (0.64 km)
- Postal code: WC1W
- Coordinates: 51°31′22″N 0°07′21″W
- West end: A4200; Russell Square
- East end: Gray's Inn Road

Guilford Street is a road in Bloomsbury in central London, England, designated the B502. From Russell Square it extends east-northeast to Gray's Inn Road. Note that it is not spelt the same way as Guildford in Surrey. It is, in fact, named after Frederick North, Lord North, a former Prime Minister, who was also 2nd Earl of Guilford (sic).

The nearest tube station is Russell Square.

== Environment ==
The street contains the rear entrance to Goodenough College, an international residential centre for postgraduates studying or training in London.

It has the main entrance to Coram's Fields, a park containing extensive facilities for children and teenagers. Unusually access is reserved for those under 16; adults are only allowed entry if accompanying a child.

On the south side is a major hospital complex including the National Hospital for Neurology and Neurosurgery, the nationally famous Great Ormond Street Hospital for children, the Princess Royal Nurses' Home, the UCL Institute of Child Health and the UCL Institute of Neurology.

On the junction with Russell Square is the Hotel Russell. The Hotel Russell was built in 1898 by the architect Charles Fitzroy Doll and opened in 1900. It is distinctively clad in decorative thé-au-lait ("tea with milk") terracotta and was based on the Château de Madrid near the Bois de Boulogne in Paris.

Its restaurant, which was originally named after the architect but is now called Neptune, is said to be almost identical to the RMS Titanic's dining room, which he designed.

Wing Commander F. F. E. Yeo-Thomas GC, MC & Bar (1902-1964), an SOE agent during the Second World War, known by the Gestapo as 'The White Rabbit', lived on Guilford Street. His former home is marked by a blue plaque.

Guilford Street is the home of Arthur Rowe, the protagonist in Graham Greene's novel "The Ministry of Fear." The house on Guilford Street is where he administers a mercy killing of his ill wife, survives the blitz, and stores a very unusual cake that is central to the plot of this spy thriller.
