= Frida Uhl =

Austrian writer and translator

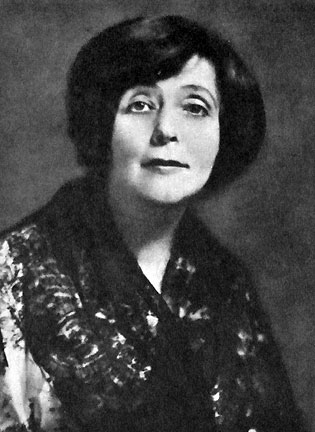

Maria Friederike Cornelia "Frida" Strindberg (née Uhl; 4 April 1872 – 28 June 1943) was an Austrian writer and translator, who was closely associated with many important figures in 20th-century literature.

== Life and career ==
Uhl was the daughter of Friedrich Uhl, editor of the Wiener Zeitung, and Maria Uhl (née Rieschl), a Catholic. She met Swedish playwright August Strindberg in early 1893, when she was only 20; they soon married and she at once tried to organize a production of his work in England, and took his financial affairs in hand. They had a daughter, Kerstin. Strindberg did not approve of the active role Frida was taking in his business affairs, and the marriage ended in divorce in 1895.

German playwright Frank Wedekind was the father of Frida's second child Friedrich. She sent her children to be cared for by her parents. With a later lover, the poet Hanns Heinz Ewers, she started the first German cabaret in 1900. She was closely involved with several writers of the Young Vienna movement, such as the poet Peter Altenberg for whom she organized a subscription, and the journalist Karl Kraus, whom she convinced to sponsor a reading of Wedekind's Pandora's Box.

Her affair with the writer Werner von Oesteren was particularly stormy. She threatened him on two separate occasions with a revolver. Details of this relationship were made public in 1905 when she sued him for harassing a detective she had hired to follow him.

In 1908 she fired a gun in a Viennese hotel on New Year's Day. It is unclear whether this was a suicide attempt; she had recently written a number of suicide notes. The event caused a great scandal as Karl, 5th Prince Fugger von Babenhausen was a guest at the party. She fled to London.

On 26 June 1912, she opened The Cave of the Golden Calf, a nightclub decorated by Wyndham Lewis, Charles Ginner, and Spencer Gore. Ezra Pound complimented her on her acumen. Other frequent guests of the establishment included Katherine Mansfield, Ford Madox Ford, and Augustus John.

In 1914, she left for the United States, where she quickly secured a job with Fox Film.

In 1933–1934, Uhl published the work Strindberg and His Second Wife under the pseudonym Frida Strindberg, articulating her version of the marriage between her and August Strindberg. The translation into Swedish was by Karin Boye, with whom Uhl collaborated in Berlin.

In 1937, she published the memoir Marriage with Genius.

She spent her last years in her family's summer residence at Mondsee and died there at the age of 71 in 1943.
