= The Cave of the Golden Calf =

Night club in London, England

Coordinates: 51.5107°N 0.1395°W

The Cave of the Golden Calf was opened in 1912 and soon developed notoriety.

The Cave of the Golden Calf was a night club in London. In existence for only two years immediately before the First World War, it epitomised decadence, and still inspires cultural events. Its name is a reference to the Golden Calf of the Biblical story, a symbol of impermissible worship.

== Description ==
It opened in an underground location in the basements from 3 to 9 Heddon Street, near Regent Street, in 1912 and became a haunt for the wealthy and aristocratic classes, as well as bohemian artists in search of a European-style cabaret. Its creator Frida Strindberg set it up as an avant-garde and artistic venture.

It introduced London to new concepts of nightlife and provided a solid model for future nightclubs. Philip Hoare, in his book Oscar Wilde's Last Stand, provided the following description:

Up in Regent Street young men wearing tight suits and nail varnish were sipping creme de menthe in the Cafe Royal, while down a dark cul-de-sac lurked a new and devilish sort of place where Futurists cavorted: a 'night club' profanely named 'The Cave of the Golden Calf'. Vague rumours had reached her that nowadays, the backstreets harboured all manner of such places, attended by members of the social elite. Such intimations confirmed all the suspicions of her class. At the root of these evils lay the name of Oscar Wilde, still unspoken in polite households. He may have been dead for more than a decade, but Wilde's decadence endured.

The club is also compared with the parties of The Coterie, a group of young aristocrats and intellectuals associated with the Cambridge Souls:

Their hedonism was not confined to private parties. In 1912, Madame Strindberg [...] leased a draper's basement in Heddon Street, a cul-de-sac behind Regent Street, and created the Cave of the Golden Calf. This 'low-ceilinged nightclub, appropriately sunk under the pavement', was decorated by Spencer Gore in Russian Ballet-inspired murals, with contributions by Jacob Epstein and Wyndham Lewis; Eric Gill designed the club's motif, a phallic Golden Calf, symbol of biblical dissipation and idolatry. Here the cult of Wilde could continue to worship. The club's self-advertised aim was to be 'a place given up to gaiety', its art-subversive interiors 'brazenly expressive of the libertarian pleasure principle ...' [...]

Ezra Pound complimented Strindberg on her acumen. Other notable visitors to the establishment included Katherine Mansfield, Ford Madox Ford, Augustus John and Wyndham Lewis.

== Legacy ==
The Cave went bankrupt in 1914, but its name lived on, and recently inspired a show at the Edinburgh Fringe and the 2010 Commemoration Ball at New College, Oxford. The building became a post office and can be seen in the background of the cover of David Bowie's album The Rise and Fall of Ziggy Stardust and the Spiders from Mars. The site is now occupied by a restaurant, Heddon Street Kitchen.
