= List of sculptures by Jacob Epstein =

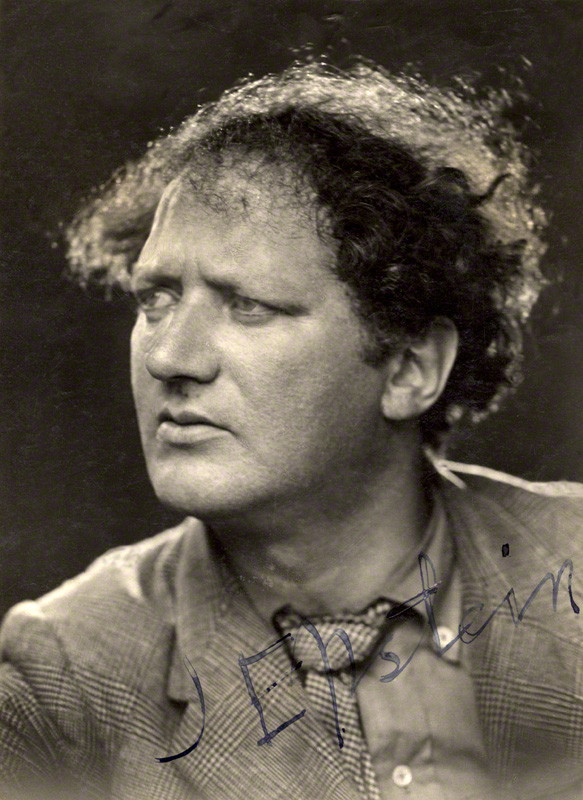
Epstein, 1921, photo by George Charles Beresford

This is a list of public sculptures by Jacob Epstein. This list only includes works held in public collections, such as museums and art galleries, in public spaces or in buildings and venues open to the public. It does not include works held only in private collections.

Throughout his career Epstein was a prolific sculptor of portrait heads and busts. He sculpted a variety of subjects including models and friends and family, as well as public figures of his time such as Winston Churchill, Albert Einstein, George Bernard Shaw and Joseph Conrad.

Many of Epstein's early large-scale public commissions, such as the Ages of Man statues in London and the tomb of Oscar Wilde in Paris, along with his exhibition pieces, were met with outrage and controversy. As a consequence, he received few public or architectural commissions from the 1930s until the 1950s. The rebuilding of Britain after the Second World War created a demand for the monumental figurative sculptures that Epstein excelled in and the last decade of his life was a period of intense activity with substantial public commissions. Several of his large exhibition works which had also provoked controversy, notably Jacob and the Angel and Adam, were initially acquired by the owners of amusement parks and freak-shows where they were displayed behind curtains and warning signs. The majority of those works did not enter any public collections or galleries until after Epstein's death in 1959.

== 1900 to 1909 ==
| Image | Title / subject | Location and coordinates | Date | Type | Material | Dimensions | Designation | Wikidata | Notes |
|---|---|---|---|---|---|---|---|---|---|
| More images | Baby Awake | The New Art Gallery Walsall | 1902-04 | Head | Bronze | 12.7cm | | | Six bronze casts in two versions. Plaster version in Mishkan Museum of Art, Israel |
| | Baby Asleep | National Galleries Scotland; The New Art Gallery Walsall; Leeds Art Gallery; Bristol Museum and Art Gallery | 1902-04 | Head | Bronze | 13.2 x 9.8 x 14.8cm | | Q76630325 | 23 casts. Plaster version in Israel Museum, Jerusalem |
| | Head of an Infant | National Gallery of Victoria | 1902-03 | Head | Bronze | 28.1 x 10.6 x 14.5cm | | | |
| | Head of a Baby | Manchester Art Gallery | 1902-04 | Head | Bronze | 13.5 x 10cm | | | |
| More images | Romilly John | Ben Uri Gallery & Museum, Fitzwilliam Museum, Fogg Museum, National Gallery of Canada, Museum Boijmans van Beuningen; The New Art Gallery Walsall | 1907 | Head | Gilded bronze | 30 x 16 x 21.5cm | | | Nine casts. Plaster version in Israel Museum |
| | Italian Peasant Women | Ingram Collection of Modern British Art | 1907 | Head | Bronze | 33cm | | | Two casts. Plaster version in Syracuse University |
| More images | The Ages of Man | Former British Medical Association headquarters, now Zimbabwe House, London | 1907-08 | 18 statues in niches | Portland stone | Each 210-215cm tall | | | Destroyed in part in 1937 with some fragments in the National Gallery of Canada collection. Plaster casts of two figures, New-Born and Maternity are in the Israel Museum, Jerusalem. |
| | The Severed Head | Metropolitan Museum of Art | 1907-08 | Head | Stone | 43.2 x 26 x 21.6cm | | | |
| More images | First Portrait of Euphemia Lamb | Tate Britain, Birmingham Museums and Art Gallery, Mishkan Museum of Art | 1908 | Bust | Bronze | 375 x 400 x 203mm | | Q76627327 | Eight casts. Plaster version, Israel Museum |
| More images | Nan | Tate Britain, Queensland Art Gallery | 1909 | Bust | Bronze | 445 x 381 x 229mm | | | Modelled by Nan Condron. Two versions plus plaster version in Mishkan Museum of Art |
| More images | Mary McEvoy | Victoria and Albert Museum on loan from Tate Britain, National Gallery of Victoria, Leeds Art Gallery | 1909 | Bust | Bronze | 419 x 394 x 229mm | | | Three casts. Plaster version in Mishkan Museum of Art |
| | Mary McEvoy / Mrs Ambrose McEvoy | Johannesburg Art Gallery | 1909 | Bust | Marble | 48cm | | | |
| | Fountain figure (Euphemia Lamb) | MAMCO, Geneva | 1908-10 | Statue | Marble | 134.5cm tall | | | Commissioned by Lady Ottoline Morrell for her garden |

== 1910 to 1914 ==
| Image | Title / subject | Location and coordinates | Date | Type | Material | Dimensions | Designation | Wikidata | Notes |
|---|---|---|---|---|---|---|---|---|---|
| More images | Sun Goddess, Crouching | Victoria and Albert Museum on loan from Nottingham Castle Museum | 1909-10 | Statue | Limestone | 37.5cm | | | |
| More images | Sun worshipper | The Café, Holland Park, London | 1910 | Relief panel | Limestone | 190 x 54cm | | | |
| More images | Sun God | Tate Britain | 1910 | Relief | Hopton Wood Stone | 2134 x 1980 x 355mm | | | On long-term loan from the Metropolitan Museum of Art |
| More images | Rom | National Museum Cardiff | 1910 | Sculpture | Limestone | 85 x 31 x 31cm | | | Portrait of Romilly John;- Inscription by Eric Gill |
| More images | Mrs Emily Chadbourne | Tate Britain | 1910 | Bust | Alabaster | 455 x 260 x 290mm | | Q141754010 | |
| | Maternity | Leeds Art Gallery | 1910 | Statue | Hopton Wood Stone | 206cm tall | | | |
| | Lady Gregory | Hugh Lane Gallery, Leeds Art Gallery | 1910 | Bust | Bronze | 38cm | | | Commissioned by Hugh Lane |
| | Mrs Marjorie Clifton | Mishkan Museum of Art | 1911 | Bust | Plaster | | | | Bronze cast in a private collection |
| | Second portrait of Euphemia Lamb | Museum of the City of New York | 1911 | Half-length figure | Plaster | | | | Four bronze casts |
| More images | Gertrude (The Bather) | Ben Uri Gallery & Museum, Carrick Hill, South Australia | 1911 | Half-figure | Bronze | 96cm high | | | Also known as Gertrude in a Bathing Cap, edition of two |
| | Nan Seated | MoMA New York | 1911 | Sculpture | Bronze | 47 x 33 x 14.9cm | | | Seven casts |
| More images | Nan The Dreamer | Fitzwilliam Museum, The New Art Gallery Walsall, Bradford Art Gallery, Birmingham Museum and Art Gallery, Cleveland Museum of Art | 1911 | Sculpture of reclining figure | Bronze | 31 x 28.5 x 36.3cm | | | Modelled by Nan Condron; Edition of six casts plus a plaster version in the Mishkan Museum of Art |
| | Nan (the Dreamer) | Bradford Art Gallery, Detroit Institute of Art, Fitzwilliam Museum | 1911 | Bust | Bronze | 14 x 15 x 9cm | | | Modelled by Nan Condron, five casts, plaster model in the Ashmolean Museum |
| More images | Head of a Women with Closed Eyes / The Sleeper | Fitzwilliam Museum | 1911 | Miniature bust on pedestal | Bronze & marble | 9.4(6.4) x 16.2 x 6.3(3.8)cm | | | Modelled by Nan Condron; Edition of three casts |
| | Mother and Child | Carrick Hill, South Australia | 1911 | Statue | Bronze | 167.6cm tall | | | Three casts. Plaster version in Mishkan Museum of Art |
| | Oscar Wilde's tomb | Père Lachaise Cemetery, Paris | 1911–12 | Sculpture | Stone | | | Q12432989 | |
| | Sunflower | National Gallery of Victoria | 1912-13 | Sculpture | Stone | 58.7 x 27.5 x 20.4cm | | | |
| More images | Self-portrait / Self-portrait with Storm Cap | National Portrait Gallery, London | 1912 | Bust | Bronze, cast 1957 | 502 x 270mm | | | 1912 plaster in Israel Museum |
| | Female Figure in Flenite | Tate Britain | 1913 | Sculpture | Serpentine stone | 457 x 95 x 121mm plus base | | | |
| | Birth | Art Gallery of Ontario | 1913 | Carved panel | Stone | 30.6 x 26.6 x 10.2cm | | | |
| | Figure in Flenite | Minneapolis Institute of Art | 1913 | Sculpture | Serpentine stone | 60.9cm | | | |
| More images | Rock Drill | 1973 reconstruction in Birmingham Museum & Art Gallery | 1913–14 | Sculpture | Plaster & metal | 205 x 141.5cm | | Q13274870 | Original version dismantled by Epstein in 1916 |
| | Mother and Child | MoMA New York | 1913 | Two heads | Marble | 43.8 x 43.1 x 10.2cm | | | |
| | Venus - First version | Baltimore Museum of Art | 1913 | Statue | Marble | 123.2 x 40.6 x 29.8cm | | | |
| | Doves (First Version) | Israel Museum | 1913 | Sculpture | Parian marble | 47 x 72 x 32cm | | Q76625676 | |
| | Doves (First Version) | Hirshhorn Museum | 1914 | Sculpture | Parian marble | 34.7 x 50.3 x 18.5cm | | | |
| More images | Doves (Second Version) | Tate Britain | 1914-15 | Sculpture | Parian marble | 648 x 787 x 343mm | | | |

== 1915 to 1919 ==
| Image | Title / subject | Location and coordinates | Date | Type | Material | Dimensions | Designation | Wikidata | Notes |
|---|---|---|---|---|---|---|---|---|---|
| | Hilda Hamblay | Mishkan Museum of Art | 1915 | Bust | Plaster | | | | Two bronze casts |
| | Elizabeth Scott-Ellis | Museum of the City of New York | 1915 | Bust | Plaster | | | | Bronze cast, possibly lost or in a private collection |
| | First Portrait of Lilian Shelley | Montreal Museum of Fine Arts | 1915 | Head | Bronze | 32.5cm | | | Three casts |
| | Admiral of the Fleet, Lord Fisher of Kilverstone | Imperial War Museum, National Gallery of Canada | 1915 | Bust | Bronze | 290 x 469 x 338mm | | Q76627716 | Five casts in two versions plus plaster casts in Israel Museum and National Maritime Museum |
| | Mask of Billie Gordon | National Gallery of Canada | 1915 | Mask | Bronze | 26.8 x 18.6 x 20.4cm | | | |
| | The Duchess of Hamilton | Hirshhorn Museum | 1915 | Half-figure | Bronze | 63.7 x 53.5 x 27.3cm | | | |
| More images | Torso in Metal from 'The Rock Drill' | Tate Britain, MoMA New York, Auckland Art Gallery, National Gallery of Canada | 1915 | Sculpture | Bronze or gunmetal | 705 x 584 x 445mm | | Q21743265 | Plaster cast in Israel Museum |
| More images | Portrait of Iris Beerbohn Tree | Tate Britain | 1915 | Head | Patinated bronze | 348 x 290 x 228mm | | | At least six casts created |
| | Second Portrait / Mask of Mrs Epstein | Auckland Art Gallery, Buffalo AKG Art Museum, Manchester Art Gallery | 1916 | Mask | Bronze | 241mm | | | Two versions, with or without earrings, in nine casts plus plaster version at Mishkan Museum of Art |
| More images | W. H. Davies | National Portrait Gallery, London, Newport Museum and Art Gallery | 1916 | Head | Bronze | 311mm high | | | Three casts |
| More images | Augustus John | National Portrait Gallery, London, National Museum Cardiff | 1916 | Bust | Bronze | 350 x 270mm | | | Eleven casts plus plaster in Israel Museum |
| | T.E. Hulme | Israel Museum | 1916 | Head | Plaster | 32 x 18 x 25cm | | Q76626042 | At least one bronze cast |
| More images | Bust of Meum Stewart | Arts Council Collection, The New Art Gallery Walsall, Manchester Art Gallery | 1916-18 | Bust | Bronze | 42.5 x 39.4 x 26.7cm | | | |
| | Second Portrait of Meum (Head) | Fogg Museum, Art Gallery of New South Wales | 1916 | Head | Bronze | 32.5cm | | | Six bronze casts;- plaster version at Mishkan Museum of Art |
| | Meum Lindsell-Stewart | National Gallery of Art, Washington | 1916-18 | Bust | Painted plaster | 43.5 x 40 x 31cm | | | |
| | Fourth Portrait of Meum / Meum with a Fan | Burrell Collection | 1916-18 | Half-figure | Bronze | 871mm | | | |
| | The Tin Hat | Imperial War Museum, Israel Museum | 1916 | Bust | Bronze | 290 x 335 x 280mm | | | Four casts, plaster version at Mishkan Museum of Art |
| | First Portrait of Bernard van Dieren | Detroit Institute of Art | 1916 | Bust | Plaster | 33.6 x 19.7 x 23cm | | | Plaster version;-University of Hull, three bronze casts |
| | James Muirhead Bone | The McManus | 1916 | Head | Bronze | 26 x 18 x 23cm | | | Four casts, plaster version in Israel Museum |
| | Venus - Second Version | Yale University Art Gallery | 1917 | Statue | Marble | 235.6 x 43.2 x 82.6cm | | | |
| | An American Soldier | Imperial War Museum, National Gallery of Art, Washington, Metropolitan Museum of Art | 1917 | Bust | Bronze | 39.9 x 26.8 x 24.3cm | | | |
| | Gladys Deacon, later Duchess of Marlborough | Israel Museum | 1917 | Bust | Plaster | 69 x 42 x 27cm | | Q76628051 | One bronze cast. |
| | Second portrait of Bernard van Dieren | Mishkan Museum of Art | 1917 | Head | Plaster | | | | One bronze cast |
| More images | Bronze Head | Watford Museum | c. 1917 | Head | Bronze | | | | Also known as Strand Head |
| | Fifth Portrait of Mrs Jacob Epstein (in a mantilla) | Laing Art Gallery, Yeshiva University Museum | 1918 | Bust | Bronze | 38cm | | Q76629695 | Seven casts in different versions, plaster in Israel Museum |
| | Marchesa Casati | Allen Memorial Art Museum, Philadelphia Museum of Art, Beecroft Art Gallery | 1918 | Head | Bronze | 29.3cm | | | Eight casts, plaster version at Mishkan Museum of Art |
| | Gabrielle Soene | Israel Museum | 1918-19 | Bust | Plaster | 55 x 40 x 22cm | | | |
| | Sergeant David Ferguson Hunter | Imperial War Museum | 1919 | Bust | Bronze | 325 x 587 x 470mm | | | |
| More images | Portrait of Hélène | Fitzwilliam Museum | 1919 | Bust | Bronze | 53.4cm | | | Modelled by Hélène Yelin, a singer. Four casts |
| | Noneen (Head of a Girl) | Ashmolean Museum | 1919 | Bust | Bronze with brown petina | 33.7cm | | | |
| | The Risen Christ | National Galleries Scotland | 1917-19 | Sculpture | Bronze | 218.5 x 54.5 x 56cm | | | |
| | Hands of the Risen Christ | The New Art Gallery Walsall | 1919 | Sculpture | Bronze | | | | |
| | Clare Sheridan | Rye Art Gallery | 1919 | Bust | Bronze | 57 x 40 x 20cm | | | Two casts |
| | Betty May | Manchester Art Gallery | 1919 | Head | Bronze | 35.5 x 21cm | | | Plaster;- Museum of the City of New York |

== 1920 to 1924 ==
| Image | Title / subject | Location and coordinates | Date | Type | Material | Dimensions | Designation | Wikidata | Notes |
|---|---|---|---|---|---|---|---|---|---|
| More images | Fourth Portrait of Peggy Jean (asleep) | Carrick Hill, The Hepworth Wakefield, Bolton Museum, Doncaster Museum and Art Gallery, The New Art Gallery Walsall | 1920 | Half-figure | Bronze | 26cm | | | Thirteen casts, plaster at Israel Museum |
| | Self-portrait with a Beard | Nottingham Castle Museum, Hull University, Los Angeles County Museum of Art | 1920 | Head | Bronze | 38.1cm | | | Seven casts, plaster version at Mishkan Museum of Art |
| More images | Second Portrait of Lilian Shelley | Burrell Collection | 1920 | Half-figure | Bronze | 705 x 580 x 380mm | | | |
| More images | Study of a Cat | The New Art Gallery Walsall | 1920 | Sculpture | Bronze | 17 x 30cm | | | Two casts |
| | Seventh Portrait of Peggy Jean (pouting) | Bradford Art Gallery | 1920-21 | Half-figure | Bronze | | | | Two casts |
| | Ninth Portrait of Peggy-Jean (laughing, at 2 years, 9 months) | Ashmolean Museum, Leeds Art Gallery, Memphis Brooks Museum of Art | 1921 | Head | Bronze | 22 x 24 x 20cm | | | Thirteen casts, plaster at Israel Museum |
| More images | First Portrait of Miriam Plichte | Glasgow Museum Resource Centre, The New Art Gallery Walsall | 1921 | Bust | Bronze | 39cm | | | Two casts |
| | Second Portrait of Miriam Plichte | Montreal Museum of Fine Arts | 1921 | Half-figure | Bronze | 61.5cm | | | Eight casts |
| More images | First Portrait of Kathleen | Tate Britain, Yale University Art Gallery, New Art Gallery Walsall, Fogg Museum, Manchester Art Gallery | 1921 | Bust | Bronze | 470 x 470 x 305mm | | | Twelve casts, plaster in the Phoenix Art Museum |
| | Second portrait of Kathleen | Mishkan Museum of Art | 1922 | Bust | Plaster | | | | Five bronze casts |
| More images | Jacob Kramer | Tate Britain, Ben Uri Gallery & Museum, Skirball Cultural Center | 1921 | Bust | Bronze | 65.5 x 53 x 30cm | | | Five casts, plaster at Mishkan Museum of Art |
| | The Girl from Senegal | The Whitworth, Buffalo AKG Art Museum, Fogg Museum, Artarmon Galleries | 1921-23 | Half-figure | Bronze | 559 x 460 x 337mm | | | Modelled by Madeleine Bechet, eight casts |
| | Old Smith, the Matchseller | Hirshhorn Museum | c. 1922 | Head | Bronze | 37.1 x 20.6 x 27.3cm | | | Three casts |
| | The Weeping Women | Leicester Museum and Art Gallery , Cleveland Museum of Art | 1922 | Half-figure with raised arms | Bronze | | | | Three casts |
| | Maquette for the Hudson Memorial | Mishkan Museum of Art | 1922-23 | Sculpture, rejected design | Plaster | 32.5 x 44cm | | | Two bronze casts |
| | Hans Kindler | Mildred Lane Kemper Art Museum | 1922–30 | Head | Plaster | | | | |
| | R.B. Cunninghame Graham | National Portrait Gallery, London, Aberdeen Art Gallery, Glasgow Museums Resource Centre, National Galleries Scotland; Manchester Art Gallery | 1923 | Head | Bronze | 468 x 265mm | | | Ten casts |
| | Old Pinager | Aberdeen Art Gallery, Mildred Lane Kemper Art Museum | 1923 | Bust | Bronze | 42 x 35 x 48cm | | | Plaster version in the Mishkan Museum of Art |
| | Old Pinager's Hands | The New Art Gallery Walsall | 1923 | Sculpture | Bronze | | | | |
| | Delores | Fitzwilliam Museum, Manchester Art Gallery | 1923 | Bust | Bronze | 38.3 x 38.9 x 27.4cm | | | Six casts in two versions |
| More images | Angel Torso | Glynn Vivian Art Gallery | Plaster 1923, bronze after 1959 | Sculpture | Bronze | | | | A plaster figure from 1923 that remained in Epstein's studio and was cast in bronze after his death, when the head, modelled in 1923 by Ferosa Rastoumji was also added. |
| | Charles Spencer-Churchill, 9th Duke of Marlborough | Blenheim Palace | 1923-25 | Half-figure | Bronze | 104.2cm | | | Portrait head in plaster in the Israel Museum, plaster model of hands in the Mishkan Museum of Art |
| | Delores (Reclining Study) | Israel Museum | 1923 | Prone figure | Bronze | 32.5 x 64 x 28cm | | | |
| | Dr. Adolph S. Oko | Mishkan Museum of Art | 1923 | Bust | Plaster | | | | Two bronze casts |
| | The Seraph (Marie Collins) | Bowdoin College, Maine | 1924 | Bust | Plaster | | | | Six bronzes |
| More images | Joseph Conrad | Hirshhorn Museum, National Portrait Gallery, London, Philadelphia Museum of Art | 1924 | Head | Bronze | 41.0 x 30.8 x 28.5cm | | | Nine casts |
| | Joseph Conrad | Manchester Art Gallery, Birmingham Museum and Art Gallery, Jewish Museum (Manhattan) | 1924 | Bust | Bronze | 48.2cm | | | Six casts plus plaster at Mishkan Museum of Art |
| | Professor Samuel Alexander | University of Manchester, Ben Uri Gallery & Museum | 1924 | Bust | Bronze | 51 x 57 x 37cm | | | Two casts |
| | Jacob Epstein of Baltimore | Baltimore Museum of Art | 1924 | Bust | Bronze | 52.7 x 57.2 x 30.5cm | | | |
| | David Erskine of Linlathen | The McManus | 1924 | Bust | Bronze | 58.5cm | | | |
| More images | Rima, W. H. Hudson Memorial | Hyde Park, London | 1924–25 | Relief | Stone | 116 x 183cm | Grade II | Q26525156 | Inscriptions cut by Eric Gill |

== 1925 to 1929 ==
| Image | Title / subject | Location and coordinates | Date | Type | Material | Dimensions | Designation | Wikidata | Notes |
|---|---|---|---|---|---|---|---|---|---|
| More images | Sybil Thorndike | National Portrait Gallery, London, Garrick Club, Doncaster Museum and Art Gallery | 1925 | Bust | Bronze | 500 x 620mm | | | Three casts |
| | First Portrait of Sunita | Private collection | 1925 | Bust | Bronze | 48.9cm | | | One bronze cast sold at Christies in 1973 |
| More images | Second Portrait of Sunita | Manchester Art Gallery | 1925 | Bust | Bronze | 55.9 x 56cm | | | |
| | Pearl Oko | Israel Museum | 1926 | Head | Bronze | 36 x 18 x 25cm | | Q76629133 | Plaster at Mishkan Museum of Art |
| More images | The Visitation | Tate Britain, Hirshhorn Museum, Queensland Art Gallery; Museo de Bellas Artes (Caracas) | 1926 | Statue | Bronze | 171 x 47 x 47cm | | Q56696120 | Eight casts, plaster model at Israel Museum |
| | Ramsay MacDonald | Palace of Westminster, National Galleries Scotland; Glasgow Museums Resource Centre | 1926 | Bust | Bronze | 49 x 25 x 28cm | | | Four casts plus a plaster version in Aberdeen Art Gallery |
| | Second Portrait of Oriel Ross | The Whitworth | 1926 | Bust | Bronze | 408 x 282 x 242mm | | | Four casts |
| More images | C.P Scott | Manchester Art Gallery, Guardian News and Media Archive, London | 1926 | Bust | Bronze | 58cm | | | |
| More images | Rabindranath Tagore | The New Art Gallery Walsall, Birmingham Museum and Art Gallery, Salford Museum and Art Gallery, Herbert Art Gallery, British High Commission, New Delhi from the Government Art Collection, Rabindra Bhavana Museum, National Gallery of Victoria | 1926 | Bust | Bronze | 51cm high | | | Sixteen casts, plaster at Mishkan Museum of Art |
| | Moshe Oyved (Edward Good) | Israel Museum | 1926 | Bust | Bronze | 41 x 25 x 28cm | | Q76629408 | |
| More images | Sunita and Enver / Heads for New York Madonna and Child | The New Art Gallery Walsall, Detroit Institute of Arts | 1926-27 | Two heads | Bronze | 48.2cm and 29.2cm | | | Seven casts |
| | Anita (Miriam Patel) | Buffalo AKG Art Museum | 1926 | Bust | Plaster | 53.3cm high | | | Two bronze casts |
| | Third portrait of Sunita | Israel Museum | 1926 | Bust with necklace | Plaster | 58.3cm | | Q76626548 | One bronze cast, Museum of African Art, Washington |
| | Professor Franz Boas | Cornell University | 1927 | Bust | Plaster | | | | Two bronze casts in private collections |
| More images | Madonna and Child | Riverside Church, New York City | 1927 | Seated sculpture group | Bronze | Life-size | | | Donated to the Riverside Church in 1960 by Sally Ryan, plaster in the Israel Museum |
| | John Dewey | National Gallery of Art, Columbia University | 1927 | Bust | Bronze | 55.9cm | | | |
| | Zeda (Pasha) | Bolton Museum, Art Gallery of Ontario | 1927 | Bust | Bronze | 68.5cm | | | |
| More images | Paul Robeson | MoMA New York, Touchstones Rochdale, York Art Gallery, Smith College Museum of Art | 1928 | Head | Bronze | 34.5 x 21.5 x 29.5cm | | Q76628064 | 19 casts, plaster at Israel Museum |
| | Maquette for Night | Mishkan Museum of Art | 1928 | Sculpture | Plaster | 35.5cm high | | | Four bronze casts in private collections |
| More images | Day | 55 Broadway, St. James', London | 1928-29 | Carved sculpture | Portland stone | 275 x 275 x 100cm | | | |
| More images | Night | 55 Broadway, St. James', London | 1928-29 | Carved sculpture | Portland stone | 275 x 275 x 100cm | | | |
| | The Sick Child (Tweltfth portrait of Peggy Jean) | The Whitworth | 1928 | Sculpture | Bronze | 362 x 507 x 572mm | | | Five casts plus plaster in the Israel Museum |
| More images | Mrs Godfrey Phillips | Tate Britain | 1928 | Bust | Bronze | 457 x 432 x 248mm | | | Six casts plus plaster model at Des Moines Art Center |
| | First portrait of Mrs Betty Joel (with necklace) | Dunedin Public Art Gallery | 1928 | Bust | Bronze | | | | Two casts |
| | Sir William Cotts | Dumfries Museum | 1929 | Bust | Bronze | 58cm | | | |
| More images | Genesis | The Whitworth | 1929-31 | Sculpture | Seravezza marble | 1625 x 838 x 787mm | | | |
| | First portrait of Lydia | Mishkan Museum of Art | 1929-30 | Bust | Plaster | 52cm | | | Seven bronze casts in private collections |

== 1930 to 1934 ==
| Image | Title / subject | Location and coordinates | Date | Type | Material | Dimensions | Designation | Wikidata | Notes |
|---|---|---|---|---|---|---|---|---|---|
| | Mary Blandford | Leicester Museum and Art Gallery | 1930-31 | Head | Bronze | 37.5cm | | | Five casts |
| More images | Rebecca | Museum of Reading | 1930 | Bust | Bronze | 56 x 37 x 26cm | | | |
| | Head of Joan Greenwood as a Child | Fitzwilliam Museum | 1930 | Head | Bronze | 43.5cm high | | | Edition of ten casts, plaster version in Art Gallery of Ontario |
| | The beautiful jewess (La belle juive) | Art Gallery of South Australia | 1930 | Head | Bronze | 55 x 46 x 27cm | | | |
| | Israfel (Sunita) | Walker Art Gallery | 1930 | Bust | Bronze | 53.3cm | | | |
| More images | Esther | Tate Britain | 1930 | Bust | Bronze | 533 x 635 x 254mm | | | |
| | Oriel | Aberdeen Art Gallery | 1931 | Bust | Bronze | 56 x 42 x 29cm | | | |
| | Third Portrait of Oriel Ross | Fitzwilliam Museum | 1931 | Bust | Bronze with golden patina | 66cm high | | | Plaster at Mishkan Museum of Art |
| | Mrs Sonia Heath | Walker Art Gallery, Keele University | 1931 | Bust | Bronze | 57cm | | | |
| | Paul Robeson, Junior | Sheffield City Art Gallery | 1931 | Bust | Bronze | 42cm | | | |
| | Professor Lucy Martin Donnelly | Bryn Mawr College | 1931 | Bust with arms | Bronze | 55.9cm | | | |
| More images | Lydia (Second Portrait of Lydia) | Ben Uri Gallery & Museum | 1931 | Half-figure | Bronze | 48 x 40 x 20cm | | | |
| More images | Primeval Gods | Tate Britain | 1931-33 | Relief | Hopton Wood Stone | 2134 x 1980 x 355mm | | | Carved on reverse of Sun God |
| | Malcolm Bendon | Israel Museum | 1931 | Bust | Plaster | | | | One bronze cast |
| | Emlyn Williams | Israel Museum | 1932 | Bust | Plaster | 47 x 32 x 25cm | | Q76630323 | One bronze cast |
| | Women Possessed (Elemental Figure) | National Gallery of Australia | 1932 | Prone sculpture | Hopton Wood Stone | 102.2 x 33.3 x 45.1cm | | | |
| | Rose | Leeds Art Gallery | 1932 | Bust | Bronze | 37.5cm | | | Two casts known |
| | Fourth Portrait of Kathleen (laughing) | Maidstone Museum | 1932 | Bust | Bronze | 38.5cm | | | Four casts in two versions |
| | Ahmed | Ulster Museum | 1932 | Bust | Bronze | 49.5cm | | | |
| | First Portrait of Isobel | Iziko South African National Gallery, Des Moines Art Center | 1932-33 | Bust | Bronze | 53.2cm | | | Seven casts, plaster in National Gallery of Victoria |
| | Second Portrait of Isobel | Ferens Art Gallery | 1932-33 | Half-figure | Bronze | 70.6cm | | | Five casts known |
| More images | Second Portrait of Isabel Nicholas | The New Art Gallery Walsall | 1933 | Half-figure | Plaster | 70.6cm | | | Previously in the collection of the Museum of Modern Art, New York |
| More images | First Portrait of Roma of Barbados | Fitzwilliam Museum | 1932 | Head | Bronze | 35.5cm high | | | Modelled by Roma Olive Martin, Three casts |
| | First Portrait of Louise | Stedelijk Museum Amsterdam | 1932 | Head | Bronze with gold patina | 50.8cm | | | Three casts, plaster at Museo de Bellas Artes (Caracas) |
| | Mrs Sarah Oyved | Israel Museum | 1932 | Bust | Bronze | 43cm | | Q76627800 | |
| More images | Albert Einstein | Hirshhorn Museum, National Galleries Scotland, Ben Uri Gallery & Museum, Fitzwilliam Museum, Carrick Hill, Des Moines Art Center, National Gallery of Victoria, Science Museum, London, Tate Britain | 1933 | Bust | Bronze | 52.5 x 29.7 x 26.5cm | | Q76628262 | 35 casts known, plaster model at Israel Museum |
| | Michael Balcon | National Portrait Gallery, London | 1933 | Bust | Bronze | 410 x 330mm | | | |
| | Tiger King (Man of Arran) | Walker Art Gallery, Hugh Lane Gallery | 1933 | Head | Bronze | 44.5cm | | | Eight casts, plaster at Hull University |
| | Third Portrait of Lydia (Laughing) | University of Aberdeen, Leeds Art Gallery, Bolton Museum | 1933 | Head | Bronze | 410 x 240 x 270mm | | | Six casts |
| More images | Robert Flaherty | The New Art Gallery Walsall | 1933 | Head | Plaster | 31.7cm | | | Previously in the collection of the Museum of Modern Art, New York; a bronze cast also exists. |
| | Lord Beaverbrook | Beaverbrook Art Gallery | 1933 | Head | Bronze | 26cm | | | Two casts, plaster at Mishkan Museum of Art |
| | Hugh Walpole | Keswick Museum | 1934 | Bust | Bronze | 40 x 17 x 23cm | | | Plaster at University of Sussex |
| | Herbert Chapman | Highbury Square, London | 1934 | Bust | Bronze | | Grade II listing | | Two casts, made in 2006, at the Emirates Stadium and at the Kirklees Stadium. |
| | Second Portrait of Ramsay MacDonald | National Portrait Gallery, London, National Galleries Scotland | 1934 | Bust | Bronze | 61cm high | | | |
| | First Portrait of George Bernard Shaw | Carrick Hill, National Gallery of Art, Washington, Harry Ransom Centre | 1934 | Bust | Bronze | 64.2cm | | | Five casts, plaster at Israel Museum |
| More images | Second Portrait of George Bernard Shaw | National Portrait Gallery, London, Queensland Art Gallery, Aberdeen Art Gallery, Glasgow Museums, National Gallery of Canada, Fogg Museum, Metropolitan Museum of Art | 1934 | Head | Bronze | 42.5 x 26.5 x 27cm | | | 25 casts |
| More images | Chaim Azriel Weizmann | National Portrait Gallery, London, Tel Aviv Museum, Mount Holyoke College Art Museum, Manchester University | 1934 | Bust | Bronze | 45 x 62 x 28cm | | | Nineteen casts, plaster at Israel Museum |
| More images | Olive | Watford Museum | 1934 | Head | Bronze | 34.8cm | | | Nine casts |
| | Hiram Halle | Israel Museum | 1934 | Bust | Plaster | 45 x 30 x 27cm | | | One bronze cast |
| | Third Portrait of Bernard van Dieren | Towneley Hall Art Gallery and Museum | 1934-35 | Bust | Bronze | 46.5cm | | | |

== 1935 to 1939 ==
| Image | Title / subject | Location and coordinates | Date | Type | Material | Dimensions | Designation | Wikidata | Notes |
|---|---|---|---|---|---|---|---|---|---|
| More images | Fifth Portrait of Kathleen | Bristol Museum and Art Gallery, The Lightbox | 1935 | Half-figure | Bronze | 79 x 52 x 39cm | | | Four casts, plaster in Israel Museum |
| | Nianda (Neander) | Hayward Bequest at Carrick Hill | 1935 | Half-figure | Bronze | 39.3cm | | | Three casts |
| | Sir Alec Martin | Hugh Lane Gallery | 1935 | Half-figure | Bronze | 63 x 61 x 37cm | | | |
| | First portrait of Jackie | Museum of the City of New York | 1935 | Bust with arms | Plaster | 30.5cm | | | Four bronze casts |
| More images | Jackie - A Babe | The New Art Gallery Walsall | 1935 | Half-figure | Bronze | | | | |
| | Sir Frank Fletcher | Charterhouse School | 1935 | Bust | Bronze | 61cm | | | Two casts |
| | Fifteenth Portrait of Peggy Jean | Gallery Oldham | 1935 | Bust | Bronze | | | | Two casts |
| | William Henry Collins | Middlesex Hospital, Royal College of Surgeons | 1935 | Bust | Bronze | 58cm | | | |
| More images | Ecce Homo | Coventry Cathedral | Carved 1935, installed 1969 | Carved monolith on pedestal | Subiaco marble | c. 3m tall | | | |
| More images | Shulamite Women (Arab Girl) | Ben Uri Gallery & Museum | 1935 | Half-figure | Bronze | 52cm | | | Two casts plus a head only version exist |
| | Mona Stewart | Mishkan Museum of Art | 1935 | Bust | Plaster | 63.5cm | | | Seven bronze casts |
| More images | Emperior Haile Selassie | The New Art Gallery Walsall | 1936 | Half-figure | Plaster | 121.8cm | | | Two bronze casts made; Plaster cast previously in the Museum of Modern Art, New York |
| | J. B. Priestley | Harry Ransom Center, Texas | 1936 | Bust | Bronze | 76.2cm | | | |
| | Elsa (Graves) | Leeds City Art Gallery | 1936 | Bust | Bronze | 36cm | | | Three casts, plaster at Albright-Knox Art Gallery |
| | Canon Charles Bernard Mortlock | St Vedast Foster Lane, London | 1936 | Portrait relief | Stone | | | | |
| | Tanya | National Gallery of Victoria | 1936 | Bust | Plaster | 57.1cm | | | Four bronze casts in private collections |
| | Consummatum Est | National Galleries Scotland | 1936-37 | Prone sculpture | Alabaster | 61 x 223.5 x 81cm | | | |
| More images | Sally Ryan | The New Art Gallery Walsall | 1937 | Bust | Bronze | 39cm | | | Two casts |
| | Pola Nerenska | Memphis Brooks Museum of Art | 1937 | Head | Bronze | 38cm | | | Five casts, plaster National Gallery of Victoria |
| More images | Second Portrait of Jackie with Curls | The New Art Gallery Walsall | 1937 | Head | Bronze | 24.9cm | | | |
| | Second Portrait of Louise (Berenice) | Sheffield Galleries and Museums Trust | 1937 | Bust | Bronze | 55cm tall | | | Two casts, plaster at Museo de Bellas Artes (Caracas) |
| | First Portrait of Norman Hornstein (The Young Communist) | Bolton Museum | 1937 | Bust | Bronze | 45.7cm | | | Five casts |
| | The Burial of Abel | Watford Museum | 1938 | Sculpture group | Bronze with green patina | | | | Three casts |
| | Adam and Eve | Watford Museum | 1938 | Two figure sculpture group | Bronze | 11.5cm | | | Four casts |
| | Marie Tracey | National Galleries Scotland | 1938 | Bust | Bronze | 40.8 x 20.5 x 34.3cm | | | Four casts, plaster at Goddard College, Vermont |
| | Betty Cecil | National Galleries Scotland | 1938 | Half-figure | Bronze | 52.7 x 42 x 34.5cm | | | Three casts |
| | Ellen Ballon | McGill University | 1938 | Half-figure | Bronze | 60 x 56 x 67cm | | | |
| | Third Portrait of Leda (with outstretched arms) | Glasgow Museums, Nottingham Castle Museum | 1939 | Bust | Bronze | 21.5cm | | | Two casts |
| | Third Portrait of Leda at Six Months | Israel Museum | 1939 | Head | Plaster | 13 x 14 x15cm | | Q91913615 | |
| | Adam | Harewood House | 1939 | Sculpture | Alabaster | 218.5cm high, base 66 x 81.3cm | | | |
| | Lisa Sainsbury | Sainsbury Centre for Visual Arts | 1939 | Bust | Bronze | 455 x 220 x 220mm | | | |
| | Third Portrait of Jackie (Ragamuffin) | Israel Museum | 1939 | Head | Plaster | 23 x 18 x 20cm | | Q61717871 | |

== 1940 to 1944 ==
| Image | Title / subject | Location and coordinates | Date | Type | Material | Dimensions | Designation | Wikidata | Notes |
|---|---|---|---|---|---|---|---|---|---|
| | Leda | Glasgow Museums Resource Centre | c. 1940 | Half-figure | Bronze | 270 x 385 x 320mm | | | A portrait of Epstein's grandchild at six months of age |
| | Fourth Portrait of Leda (with coxcomb) | Portsmouth City Museum, Bolton Museum | 1940 | Head | Bronze | 20.4cm | | | Ten casts |
| More images | Fourth Portrait of Leda (with coxcomb) | The New Art Gallery Walsall | 1940 | Head | Plaster | 20.4cm | | | Previously held by the Museum of Modern Art, New York |
| More images | Jacob and the Angel | Tate Britain | 1940-41 | Sculpture | Alabaster | 2140 x 1100 x 920mm | | | |
| | I. M. Maisky | Imperial War Museum | 1941 | Head | Bronze | 205 x 255 x 195mm | | Q76626850 | Six casts, plus plaster, dated 1938, in Israel Museum |
| | First Portrait of Deirdre (with arms) | Bolton Museum, Carrick Hill, South Australia | 1941 | Half-figure | Bronze | 62.3cm | | | Six casts, plaster in Israel Museum |
| | Second Portrait of Deirdre (In a Slip) | Ingram Collection of Modern British Art, Knightshayes Court, The Box, Plymouth, Beaverbrook Art Gallery | 1941-42 | Half-figure | Bronze with brown petina | 54.6cm | | | Seven casts, plaster cast in National Gallery of Victoria |
| | Chia Pi | National Museum Cardiff | 1941 | Bust | Bronze | 61cm | | | Five casts |
| | Third Portrait of Deirdre (Leaning forward) | Lady Lever Art Gallery, Winnipeg Art Gallery, Crawford Art Gallery | 1942 | Bust | Bronze with green patina | 41cm | | | Eight casts |
| | Ian (Ossian) | Auckland Art Gallery, Jewish Museum (Manhattan) | 1942 | Half-figure;- baby with arms | Bronze | 406mm | | | Five casts, plaster in Museo de Bellas Artes (Caracas) |
| | Girl with Gardenias (Kathleen) | Aberdeen Art Gallery | 1942 | Statue | Bronze | 190cm tall | | | |
| More images | Saint Francis | The New Art Gallery Walsall | 1942 | Head | Bronze | 31cm | | | |
| | Dr W.G. Whittaker | Music Department, Newcastle University | 1942 | Head | Bronze | 31.1cm tall | | | |
| | Study for Slave Hold | Bolton Museum | 1941 | Two half-figures with raised arms | Bronze | 114.3cm | | | |
| | Robert Sainsbury | Sainsbury Centre for Visual Arts | 1942 | Head | Bronze | 30.5cm | | | |
| | Alexander Margulies | Ben Uri Gallery & Museum | 1942 | Bust | Bronze | 41.9 x 31 x 25cm | | | |
| | Hewlett Johnson | Beaney House of Art and Knowledge | 1942 | Bust | Bronze | | | | |
| | Air Chief Marshal Sir Charles Portal | Imperial War Museum | 1942-43 | Head | Bronze | 240 x 450 x 188mm | | | Commissioned by the War Artists' Advisory Committee |
| | Major-General Sir Alan Cunningham | Imperial War Museum | 1942 | Head | Bronze | 275 x 596 x 610mm | | | Commissioned by the War Artists' Advisory Committee |
| More images | The Rt. Hon. Ernest Bevin | Tate Britain | 1943 | Head | Bronze | 260 x 216 x 248mm | | | Commissioned by the War Artists' Advisory Committee; two casts plus plaster in Israel Museum |
| | Philip Sayers | W. Irving Gallery, New York City | 1943 | Bust | Bronze | 60cm | | | |
| | Nude Study A (Betty Peters) | MoMA, New York | 1943-45 | Prone statue | Bronze | 72.4cm length | | | Six casts plus plaster at Mishkan Museum of Art |
| | Nude Study B (Betty Peters) | MoMA, New York | 1943-45 | Prone statue | Bronze | 58.4cm length | | | Four casts |
| | Two Hands and an Arm | The New Art Gallery Walsall | 1943-45 | Sculpture | Bronze | | | | Modelled by Betty Peters |
| | Yehudi Menuhin | Te Papa, Wellington | 1943 | Head | Bronze | 260 x 470 x 202mm | | | Twelve casts, plaster at The New Art Gallery Walsall, formerly at the Jewish Museum (Manhattan) |
| | Lucifer | Birmingham Museum and Art Gallery | 1944–45 | Statue | Bronze | 3.15m tall, 1.93m wingspan | | | |
| | Princess Nadejada de Braganza | Centre Pompidou | 1944 | Bust | Bronze, green patina | 61cm high | | | Plaster, National Gallery of Victoria |
| More images | First Portrait of Esther (with long hair) | The New Art Gallery Walsall | 1944 | Bust | Bronze, gark green patina | 47cm | | Q76629549 | Three casts, plaster at Mishkan Museum of Art |
| More images | First Portrait of Kitty (with curls) / Head of Kitty with Curls | Huddersfield Art Gallery, The New Art Gallery Walsall | 1944 | Head | Bronze | 38 x 39 x 36cm | | | Eleven casts plus plaster in Israel Museum |
| | Fifth Portrait of Leda (pouting) / Head of Leda | Auckland Art Gallery, Manchester Art Gallery | 1944 | Head | Bronze | 260 x 220 x 280mm | | | Nine casts, plaster at Mishkan Museum of Art |
| | Girl from Baku | Nottingham Castle Museum | 1944 | Half-figure | Bronze | 56.5cm | | | Ten casts |

== 1945 to 1949 ==
| Image | Title / subject | Location and coordinates | Date | Type | Material | Dimensions | Designation | Wikidata | Notes |
|---|---|---|---|---|---|---|---|---|---|
| | Field Marshal Archibald Wavell | Imperial War Museum | 1945 | Bust | Bronze | 300 x 470 x 440mm | | | |
| More images | John Anderson, 1st Viscount Waverley | Imperial War Museum, All Saints Church, Westdean; Port of London Authority | 1945 | Bust | Bronze | 245 x 380 x 190mm | | | Three casts |
| | Mexican Girl | Hayward Bequest at Carrick Hill | 1945-46 | Half-figure | Bronze | | | | |
| | Dame Myra Hess | Royal Academy of Music | 1946 | Half-figure | Bronze | 630 x 520mm | | | |
| | Winston Churchill | Imperial War Museum, Hirshhorn Museum, Iziko South African National Gallery, Churchill College, Cambridge, Carrick Hill, Pompidou Centre, The White House from the Government Art Collection, Gallery Oldham | 1946 | Bust | Bronze | 40.2 x 19.7 x 24cm with base | | Q28843749 | 27 casts, plus plaster at Israel Museum |
| More images | First portrait of Pandit Nehru | The New Art Gallery Walsall | 1946 | Bust | Plaster | 29.5cm | | | Plaster version previously held by Museum of Modern Art, New York; bronze cast in Derby Museum and Art Gallery |
| | Neptune | National Museum Cardiff | 1946 | Group sculpture | Bronze | 34cm | | | Four casts |
| | Ronald Duncan | Ronald Duncan Literary Foundation | 1946 | Head | Bronze | 25.4cm | | | Six casts |
| | Ymiel Oyved | Israel Museum | 1946 | Half-figure | Bronze | 38cm | | Q76626778 | Five casts |
| | Frederick H. Silberman | Johannesburg Art Gallery | 1946 | Head | Bronze | 26cm | | | |
| | Anthony in a Balaclava Helmet | Mishkan Museum of Art | 1947 | Bust | Plaster | 33cm | | | One bronze cast |
| | Lord Lindsay of Birker | Balliol College, Oxford | 1947 | Head | Bronze | 54cm | | | Plaster at Keele University |
| More images | Second Portrait of Kitty | Birmingham Museum and Art Gallery, The New Art Gallery Walsall | 1947-49 | Head | Bronze | 31.8cm | | | Seven casts, plaster at Phoenix Art Museum |
| | Lazarus | Chapel of New College, Oxford | 1947–48 | Statue | Hopton Wood Stone | 2.5m | | | |
| | Helen Esterman | Winnipeg Art Gallery | c. 1948 | Bust | Bronze | 39.7 x 33.1 x 25.7cm | | | |
| More images | Second portrait of Pandit Nehru | National Portrait Gallery, London, Art Gallery of South Australia | 1948-49 | Bust | Bronze | 40 x 45 x 20cm | | | Three casts |
| | Franklin Dyall | Garrick Club, London | 1948 | Half-figure | Bronze | 53cm | | | |
| | Isaac L. Myers | Memphis Brooks Museum of Art | 1948 | Head | Bronze | 33 x 17 x 21cm | | | |
| | Peter Laughing | Mishkan Museum of Art | 1948 | Bust | Plaster | 30.5cm | | | Four bronzes cast |
| | Second portrait of Joan Greenwood | Hull University | 1948 | Bust | Plaster | 38cm | | | Four bronze casts in private collections |
| | Second portrait of Esther | Jewish Museum, New York | 1948 | Bust | Plaster | 47cm | | | Two bronze casts |
| | Seventh portrait of Kathleen (with shawl) | Israel Museum | 1948 | Half-length figure | Plaster | 73 x 55 x 39cm | | | Three bronze casts |
| | Ernest Bloch | Israel Museum | 1948-49 | Bust | Plaster | 40 x 24 x 25cm | | Q76629590 | One bronze cast |
| | Princess Menen | National Gallery of Art, Washington | 1948-49 | Bust | Bronze | 54.3 x 53.3 x 32.7cm | | | |
| | Princess Desta | Tel Aviv Museum | 1948-49 | Bust | Bronze | 53.3cm | | | |
| | Lucian Freud | National Portrait Gallery, London | 1949 | Bust | Bronze | 510 x 210mm | | | Eight bronze casts, also a 1947 plaster model, with arms, at Allen Memorial Art Museum |
| More images | Ann Freud | Tate Britain, Yeshiva University Museum | 1949-50 | Head | Bronze | 280 x 190 x 203mm | | Q76626938 | Five casts, plaster version at Israel Museum, Jersulam |
| More images | Third portrait of Esther / Esther with Flower | Queensland Art Gallery, The New Art Gallery Walsall | 1949 | Half-figure | Bronze | 60.5 x 45 x 28cm | | | Six casts, plaster in Israel Museum |
| | Judith Margulies | Israel Museum | 1949 | Half-figure of a child | Plaster | 20.3cm | | Q76630135 | Two bronze casts |
| | Siobham | Museo de Bellas Artes (Caracas) | 1949 | Bust of a child | Plaster | 33cm | | | |
| | Master Stewart, (Babe with arms) | Israel Museum | 1949 | Half-figure of a child | Plaster | 27 X 20 X 16cm | | Q76626117 | Two bronzes in different versions |
| More images | Roland Joffé | The New Art Gallery Walsall | 1949-50 | Head | Bronze, gold patina | 21cm | | | Plaster at Mishkan Museum of Art |
| | Victor | Leeds City Art Gallery, Kelvingrove Museum | 1949 | Head on base | Bronze & stone | 250 x 170 x 200mm | | Q76625885 | Edition of 15 casts, plaster at Israel Museum |
| | Youth Advances | Manchester Art Gallery | 1949-50 | Statue | Bronze | 208cm tall | | | Commissioned for the 1951 Festival of Britain |

== 1950 to 1954 ==
| Image | Title / subject | Location and coordinates | Date | Type | Material | Dimensions | Designation | Wikidata | Notes |
|---|---|---|---|---|---|---|---|---|---|
| More images | Woman Removing Her Dress | Roper's Gardens, Chelsea Embankment, London | Carved c. 1950, unveiled June 1973 | Relief | Portland stone | 144 x 108 x 20cm | | | |
| | Gwen, Lady Melchett of Landford | Mishkan Museum of Art | 1950 | Head | Plaster | 30cm | | | Two bronze casts |
| | Lord Samuel | Reform Club, London | 1950 | Bust | Bronze | | | | |
| More images | Patrick Blackett | Sussex University | 1950 | Bust | Plaster | | | Q124360608 | 1950 bronze cast, location unknown; 1997 bronze cast, Imperial College, London |
| | Ralph Vaughan Williams | National Portrait Gallery, London, Arts Council England collection, Manchester Art Gallery; York University | 1950 | Bust | Bronze with green patina | 39.5 x 25 x 29cm | | Q107863579 | 17 known casts, plaster at Israel Museum |
| | Marcella Barzetti | Israel Museum | 1950 | Head | Plaster | 29 x 25 x 24cm | | Q76625846 | |
| | Louis Colville Gray Clarke | Fitzwilliam Museum | 1951 | Bust | Bronze with green patina | 53.2cm high | | | |
| | Robert Rhodes | National Gallery of Victoria | 1951 | Head of a child | Plaster | 39.4cm | | | Five bronze casts |
| More images | Somerset Maugham | Hirshhorn Museum, Tate Britain | 1951 | Bust | Bronze | 39cm high | | | Seven bronze casts; plaster at the Phoenix Art Museum |
| More images | Maquette for Madonna and Child | Hirshhorn Museum, Auckland Art Gallery, The New Art Gallery Walsall, Arts Council Collection, Vatican Museums | 1951 | Sculpture | Lead with brass wire | 34.2 x 14.9 x 6.7cm | | | Six known casts, |
| | Christ Figure | Hirshhorn Museum | c. 1951 | Sculpture | Lead | 65.2 x 22 x 9.4cm | | | |
| | Alic Halford Smith | New College, Oxford | 1951-52 | Bust | Bronze | 61cm high | | | |
| | Maquette for Social Consciousness | Birmingham Museum and Art Gallery | 1951-53 | Sculpture group | Bronze | 35.5cm | | | |
| More images | Social Consciousness | University of Pennsylvania | 1951-53 | Sculpture group | Bronze | | | | Previously located outside The Art Museum of Philadelphia. |
| | Set of four door handles | Convent of the Holy Child Jesus, Cavendish Square, Coventry Cathedral | 1952 | Door handles | Bronze | | | | Five sets known to exist |
| | Portland Mason | Bury Art Museum | 1952 | Head | Bronze | 34cm | | | |
| | Dame Hilda Lloyd | Medical School, Birmingham University | 1952 | Bust | Bronze | 56cm | | | |
| | Mark Joffe | Watford Museum | 1952 | Head | Bronze | 30cm | | | |
| More images | Madonna and Child | Dean's Mews, Cavendish Square, London | 1952 | Architectural sculpture | Lead | 3.9 x 1.4m | | | Architect Louis Osman |
| | First Portrait of Annabel Freud (with bonnet) | Hirshhorn Museum, The New Art Gallery Walsall | 1952 | Head | Bronze | 18 x 15 x 16cm | | | Four casts including one without a bonnet and a plaster version in the Israel Museum |
| More images | Anne and Annabel Freud (The Sisters) | The New Art Gallery Walsall | 1952 | Two heads | Bronze | 19cm high | | | |
| More images | T. S. Eliot | Hirshhorn Museum, The New Art Gallery Walsall | 1952-53 | Bust | Bronze | 46.0 x 45.3 x 35.4cm | | | Six casts, original plaster model in the National Portrait Gallery, London |
| | Sholem Asch | Ben Uri Gallery & Museum, Cleveland Museum of Art, Israel Museum | 1953 | Head | Bronze | 50 x 22.5 x 32cm | | | Six casts plus plaster at Mishkan Museum of Art |
| | Sir Stafford Cripps | St Paul's Cathedral, London | 1953 | Half-figure on pedestal | Bronze | | | | Inscription carved by David McFall |
| | Professor James Walter MacLeod | School of Medicine, Leeds University | 1953 | Head | Bronze | 33cm high | | | |
| | Mai Zetterling | Los Angeles County Museum of Art | 1953 | Bust | Bronze | 53.3cm tall | | | |
| | Lord Bertrand Russell | Hirshhorn Museum, British High Commission, Dar es Salaam from Government Art Collection | 1953 | Head | Bronze with green patina | 42cm | | | Four casts;- plaster at Israel Museum |
| More images | Frisky, the Sculptor's Dog | The New Art Gallery Walsall | 1953 | Sculpture | Bronze | | | | |
| | Dr Elias Avery Lowe | Morgan Library & Museum, Metropolitan Museum of Art | 1953-54 | Bust | Bronze | 61.9 x 20.3 x 17.8cm | | | Three casts |
| | Field Marshal Jan Christian Smuts | Israel Museum | 1953-55 | Head | Bronze | 51 x 33 x 42cm | | | |
| | Dr J.J. Mallon | Toynbee Hall, London | 1954 | Bust | Bronze | 42cm high | | | Two casts |
| More images | Christ in Majesty | Llandaff Cathedral, Cardiff | 1954-55 | Sculpture | Aluminium | 5.5m high | | | |

== 1955 to 1959 ==
| Image | Title / subject | Location and coordinates | Date | Type | Material | Dimensions | Designation | Wikidata | Notes |
|---|---|---|---|---|---|---|---|---|---|
| | Franklin Medal | | 1955, presented 1956 | Medal | Bronze | | | | Medal with images of Benjamin Franklin and Prometheus |
| | Ludwig Loewy | National Galleries Scotland | 1955 | Bust | Bronze | 67.5 x 76.5 x 34.5cm | | | Six casts made for Loewy family members |
| | Marquette for a Trade Union Congress war memorial | Bolton Museum, Ashmolean Museum | 1955 | Sculpture | Bronze | 54.5 x 29.5cm | | | |
| More images | Rosalyn Tureck | The New Art Gallery Walsall | 1956 | Head | Plaster | 28cm tall | | | Plaster previously held by the Museum of Modern Art, New York; bronze cast in Philadelphia Museum of Art |
| | The Hon. Robert Hesketh | The New Art Gallery Walsall | 1956 | Bust of a child | Bronze | 45cm | | | Two bronze casts; plaster cast in Israel Museum |
| More images | Liverpool Resurgent | Former Lewis's department store, Ranelagh Street, Liverpool | 1956 | Statue | Bronze | 5.4m tall | Grade II | Q42852357 | |
| More images | Children Fighting, Baby in a Pram & Children Playing | Former Lewis's department store, Ranelagh Street, Liverpool | 1956 | Three relief panels | Ciment fondu | 101 x 183cm each | Grade II | | |
| | Sir James Gray | Department of Zoology, Cambridge University | 1956 | Bust | Bronze | 63.5cm tall | | | |
| More images | Statue of Jan Smuts | Parliament Square, London | 1956 | Statue on pedestal | Bronze & granite | | Grade II listing | Q20785576 | |
| | Marquette for Saint Michael and the Devil | Wesley House, Cambridge | 1956 | Sculpture group | Terracotta / bronze | | | | Plaster at Mishkan Museum of Art |
| | Third Portrait of Kitty (with short hair) | Queensland Art Gallery | 1957 | Bust | Bronze | 57.5 x 43 x 35cm with pedestal | | | Plaster at Mishkan Museum of Art |
| | Virginia, Marchioness of Bath | Longleat House | 1957 | Bust | Bronze | 57cm high | | | |
| | Sir Wilfrid Le Gros Clark FRS | School of Human Anatomy, Oxford University | 1957 | Bust | Bronze with green patina | 40cm high | | | Plaster at Cornell University |
| | Maria Donska | Atkinson Art Gallery and Library | 1957 | Head | Bronze | 42cm high | | | |
| | Otto Klemperer | Government Art Collection | 1957 | Head | Bronze | 37.5 x 22 x 29cm | | | Four casts;- Plaster version at the Israel Museum |
| More images | William Blake | Westminster Abbey, London | 1957 | Bust | Bronze | 54 x 67 x 37cm | | | Plaster version at Israel Museum |
| | Lady Lebel Phipps | Israel Museum | 1957 | Half-figure | Plaster | 50 x 44 x 37cm | | | |
| | Dean John Lowe | Christ Church, Oxford | 1957 | Bust | Bronze | 61cm high | | | Plaster version held by National Gallery of Canada |
| More images | Bishop Edward Sydney Woods | Lichfield Cathedral | 1958 | Half-figure | Bronze | 91.4 x 99cm | | | Plaster version in the National Gallery of Victoria |
| | Professor Charles Mclnnes | Bristol Museum & Art Gallery | 1958 | Head | Bronze | 38.0cm | | | |
| | William Haley | Broadcasting House, London | 1958 | Bust | Bronze | 63.0cm | | | |
| More images | St Michael's Victory over the Devil | Coventry Cathedral | 1958 | Wall mounted sculpture group | Bronze | | | Q27436668 | |
| More images | Trade Union Victims of Two World Wars - The Spirit of Trade Unionism | Congress House, London | 1958 | Sculpture | Stone | 300 x 150 x 120cm | Grade II* | | |
| More images | Basil Spence | RIBA Architectural Study Room, Victoria and Albert Museum | c. 1958 | Bust | Bronze | | | | Plaster cast, University of Sussex |
| | David Lloyd George | National Museum Cardiff | 1958-59 | Bust | Plaster | 65 x 87.5 x 51.4cm | | | |
| | Lady Sophia Cavendish | Israel Museum | 1959 | Half-figure of a child | Plaster | 43 x 34 x 32cm | | Q76626302 | |
| | Sir Russell Brain | Royal College of Physicians, London, New College, Oxford | 1959 | Bust | Bronze | 73.7cm | | | |
| | Archbishop Geoffrey Francis Fisher | Lambeth Palace, London | 1959 | Bust | Bronze | 63.5cm | | | |
| | David Lloyd George | Beaverbrook Art Gallery, The New Art Gallery Walsall | 1959 | Head | Bronze | 63.5cm | | | |
| | Princess Margaret, Countess of Snowdon | Keele University | 1959 | Half-statue | Bronze | 92cm | | | |
| | The Artist's Hand | Winnipeg Art Gallery | 1959 | Sculpture | Bronze | 15 x 18.7 x 14.5cm | | | Edition of six casts |
| | Christ in Majesty | Riverside Church, New York City | Erected after 1959 | Sculpture | Gilded plaster | | | | This is the plaster model from which the Llandaff Cathedral figure was cast |
| More images | The Rush of Green | Edinburgh Gate, Hyde Park, London | 1959, unveiled 1961 | Sculpture group | Bronze | | Grade II | Q21714480 | Also known as Pan or The Bowater House Group |
