= List of people from the Borough of Woking =

This is a list of famous or notable people born in, or associated with, the Borough of Woking in England, who have a Wikipedia page.

Woking is a town and borough in Surrey, around 23 mi (37 km) southwest of central London. In addition to the town of Woking, the borough also includes the settlements of Brookwood, Knaphill, Pyrford, Byfleet and West Byfleet.

The first surviving record of the settlement is from Domesday Book of 1086, in which the manor appears as Wochinges. The "monastery at Wocchingas" is mentioned in a c. 1200 copy of an early 8th-century letter from Pope Constantine to Hedda, Abbot of Bermondsey and Woking. (Note: There is some doubt as to the accuracy and authenticity of Medieval copies of earlier Anglo-Saxon documents.)

== List of notable people ==
| Image | Name | Residence Period | Notes |
|---|---|---|---|
| — | Michael Axworthy | - | Academic, historian and commentator with special interest in Iran |
| — | Arthur Balfour, 1st Earl of Balfour | 1929 to death | Politician, Prime Minister 1902-05, author of Balfour Declaration; lived at Fisher's Hill, Hook Heath Road |
| Gerald Balfour 2nd Earl of Balfour | Gerald Balfour 2nd Earl of Balfour | – | Politician, lived at Fisher's Hill, Hook Heath Road |
| — | Elizabeth Balfour, Countess of Balfour | | Politician, suffragette, lived at Fisher's Hill, Hook Heath Road |
| Lady Margaret Beaufort | Lady Margaret Beaufort | – | Mother of King Henry VII, lived in Woking Palace for 5 years |
| — | Sir Alec Bedser | – | Surrey County and England Cricketer |
| — | Eric Bedser | – | Surrey County Cricketer |
| Richard Benson | Richard Benson | – | Singer and guitarist born at Woking |
| George Bernard Shaw | George Bernard Shaw | 1901–1903 | playwright, critic, political activist |
| — | Martin Birch | – | Rock music producer/engineer for Deep Purple, Black Sabbath, Iron Maiden (1948) |
| — | John Braine | – | Novelist |
| — | Thomas Breakwell | – | First Englishman to be a convert to the Baháʼí Faith |
| — | Rick Buckler | – | drummer with The Jam, (1955) |
| — | Sonya Butt | 1940–1943 | WW2 Special Operations Executive agent |
| James Cracknell | James Cracknell | – | Olympic rower, from Pyrford |
| Claire Darke | Claire Darke | – | The 161st Mayor of Wolverhampton, grew up in Woking |
| Peter Davison | Peter Davison | – | actor, former lead in Doctor Who attended The Winston Churchill School (Woking) |
| Ron Dennis | Ron Dennis | – | CEO/Chairman of the McLaren Group |
| Susie Dent | Susie Dent | – | a lexicographer and the dictionary expert on Countdown |
| Emilia Dilke | Emilia Dilke | – | art historian, feminist and trade unionist, lived at Pyrford Rough |
| Ben Charles Edwards | Ben Charles Edwards | – | photographer/filmmaker |
| Bruce Foxton | Bruce Foxton | – | bass player with The Jam, (1955) |
| John Paul Getty | John Paul Getty | – | Lived in Sutton Green |
| Robert Freke Gould | Robert Freke Gould | | Soldier, barrister and historian of Freemasonry |
| — | Derek Griffiths | – | children's entertainer, born in Woking |
| Rupert Guinness, 2nd Earl of Iveagh | Rupert Guinness, 2nd Earl of Iveagh | 1906–1967 | businessman, lived at Pyrford |
| Lady Emma Hamilton | Lady Emma Hamilton | – | lover of Horatio Nelson. Hamilton lived in Pyrford |
| Harry Hill | Harry Hill | – | comedian, was born in Woking (1964) |
| — | Bob Hiller | – | former England international rugby union player, was born in Woking (1942) |
| — | Brian Hooper | – | Olympic pole vaulter |
| — | Marmaduke Hussey, Baron Hussey of North Bradley | – | newspaper executive, was born at Worplesdon Hill (1923) |
| Chris Ingram | Chris Ingram | | Businessman, Entrepreneur and Former Chairman of Woking F.C. |
| Graham Willmott | Graham Willmott | | Better known as Albert Jack, bestselling author from Winston Churchill School |
| — | Jentina | – | rapper |
| Kazuo Ishiguro | Kazuo Ishiguro | – | novelist, attended Woking County Grammar School |
| Adelina de Lara | Adelina de Lara | – | concert pianist, lived and worked in Woking. |
| — | Rowland Lee | – | composer, pianist, conductor and music arranger born in Woking (1960), attended Sheerwater Secondary School, Woking Boys Grammar School and Woking VI Form College. |
| Sean Lock | Sean Lock | – | comedian, was born in Woking (1963) |
| — | Peter Lord | – | co-founder of Aardman Animations, attended Woking Grammar school |
| Liz Lynne | Liz Lynne | – | Liberal Democrat politician |
| — | Tom Mison | – | actor |
| — | Iain Morris | – | Co-Writer of The Inbetweeners, born in Woking |
| — | Robert Ogilvie | - | England footballer, captain of Clapham Rovers team who won 1880 FA Cup Final, died at Golf Cottage, St John's (1938) |
| Ian Ogilvy | Ian Ogilvy | – | actor, 1943 |
| Rick Parfitt | Rick Parfitt | – | guitarist for Status Quo went to school in Sheerwater and had family in the area, |
| Francis Henry Salvin | Francis Henry Salvin | – | naturalist and writer, lived at Sutton Place and Whitmoor House |
| Delia Smith | Delia Smith | – | best-selling cook was born in Woking |
| Ethel Smyth | Ethel Smyth | – | composer and the first woman suffragette |
| The Spice Girls | The Spice Girls | – | pop group, started their careers at a Knaphill studio |
| David Sproxton | David Sproxton | – | co-founder of Aardman Animations, attended Woking Grammar school |
| — | Laurretta Summerscales | – | Ballerina, principal dancer with Bayerisches Staatsballett in Munich and formerly with the English National Ballet, grew up in Woking |
| Alan Turing | Alan Turing | – | mathematician, Cremated at Woking Crematorium |
| — | Sam Underwood | – | actor |
| — | Tony Wakeford | – | neo-folk musician, co-founder of Death in June, founder and vocalist of Sol Invictus, & L'Orchestre Noir |
| Paul Weller | Paul Weller | – | guitarist and singer-songwriter, The Style Council, The Jam. "Town Called Malice", which was written by Paul Weller and recorded by his band, The Jam, is about Woking. The song reached No. 1 in the UK Charts. |
| H. G. Wells | H. G. Wells | 1895-1898 | author who used the town as a setting for his novel The War of the Worlds and was staying in the town when he wrote it. A large sculpture of a (Wellsian) Martian Fighting Machine (above) was installed in the town centre to commemorate Woking's links with the story. |
| Matt Willis | Matt Willis | – | musician, singer-songwriter, television presenter and actor, who was a founding member of pop rock band Busted and was the winner of I'm A Celebrity... in 2006, lived in Woking and attended Woking High School |
| — | Ken Wood | – | founded the Kenwood company in Woking |

== Bibliography ==
- Crosby, Alan (2003). Woking. Chichester: Phillimore. ISBN 978-1-86-077262-7.
- de Gray Birch, Walter, ed. (2012). Cartularium Saxonium. Vol. I. doi:10.1017/CBO9781139177313. ISBN 978-1-13-917731-3.
- Field, Marion (2012). Woking : A history and celebration. Salisbury: Francis Frith. ISBN 978-1-84-589667-6.
- Gover, J.E.B; Mawer, A.; Stenton, F.M. (1969). The place-names of Surrey. Cambridge: Cambridge University Press.
