= Oscar Wilde's tomb =

Tomb in Père Lachaise Cemetery, Paris, France

- The tomb in 2009 (pre-barrier)
- Artist: Jacob Epstein
- Year: August 1914
- Type: Carving
- Medium: Hopton Wood Stone
- Subject: Winged sphinx figure
- Weight: 20 t (44,000 lb) (original block)
- Location: Père Lachaise Cemetery, Paris, France; 48.861889°N 2.398139°E

Oscar Wilde's tomb is located in Père Lachaise Cemetery, Paris, France. It took nine to ten months to complete by the sculptor Jacob Epstein, with an accompanying plinth by Charles Holden and an inscription carved by Joseph Cribb. As of the 50th anniversary of Wilde's death, the tomb also contains the ashes of Robert Ross, Wilde's lover and literary executor.

== Commission ==
In 1908, Oscar Wilde's literary executor Robert Ross chose Jacob Epstein for the commission of the tomb at a cost of £2,000 (equivalent to about £208,000 in 2025), which had been anonymously donated for this purpose. Later, in a publication of letters between Ada Leverson and Ross in 1930, Letters to the Sphinx, the anonymous donor was revealed to be Helen Carew, with financial assistance from novelist Stephen Hudson (Sydney Schiff). This was only Epstein's second commission, his first being the sculpture for the Holden-designed British Medical Association building in The Strand; these had been severely criticised for being too sexualised for public consumption. However, Epstein retained some noteworthy supporters within the Wilde circle, such as William Rothenstein.

== About the tomb ==
The choice of Oscar Wilde's monument created controversy. Wilde's supporters would have liked for the monument to derive in some way from Wilde's works, such as The Young King, by invoking homoerotica with figures of forlorn Greek youths, whereas Wilde's detractors believed he was deserving of no monument at all. One can see the influences of Wilde's works in Epstein's original sketches for the tomb, which feature two young men, heads downcast in an image of grief and sorrow upon an empty stone stele. However, Epstein has said of his sketches of the tomb that he "was dissatisfied and scrapped quite completed work."

It has been suggested that the change in design plans are due to Epstein's new focus on Wilde's poem The Sphinx. However, a number of influences began to play on Epstein around this period, including that of fellow sculptor Eric Gill. The two artists were deeply interested in what they saw as the more primal sexuality of Indian and Egyptian art, as opposed to British art. Pennington refers to this period in Epstein's work as the Sun Temple period and claims that, having been unable to follow this path with some of his works in Britain, Epstein transferred his new passion onto the Wilde tomb.

The monument began as a 20-tonne (44,000 lb) block of Hopton Wood Stone in Derbyshire, England, unveiled to the London press in June 1912. Epstein devised a vast winged figure, a messenger swiftly moving with horizontal wings, giving the feeling of forward flight; the conception was purely symbolical, the conception of a poet as a messenger, but many people tried to read into it a portrait of Oscar Wilde.

In the original sketches, the influences have been linked to the winged Assyrian bulls in the British Museum. The small angel figure behind the ear of the Sphinx may have been a deliberate reference by Epstein to the verse in Wilde's poem The Sphinx: "sing me all your memories". Upon the headdress there are five figures, one with a crucifix, perhaps symbolising the martyrdom of Oscar Wilde; this may be a recurring theme—Epstein may have chosen the Sphinx with a crucified figure upon the headdress in reference to the sensual life choice of Wilde thinly veiled by his Catholicism. In Epstein's original sketchings there is a list of ten sins, however none are recognisable clearly on the final monument apart from the Egyptian-like helmet haircuts on the women.

On the finished stone monument, the small angel behind the ear has been removed and replaced by an elaborate headdress, the crucified figure and the phallic sphinx have been removed, and in their place is a personification of fame being trumpeted. This may have been Epstein landing on a less sentimental, carved and angular alternative.

Whilst transporting the monument to the cemetery in France from his Cheyne Walk studios in London, Epstein ran into trouble with the police – having rejected its status as a work of art, French customs placed a punishing import duty of £120 (equivalent to about £11,970 in 2025) on the monument for the value of the stone. Once the bill was paid (it has been suggested that Robert Ross had borrowed the funds from Ada Leverson), the monument was covered with tarpaulin due to the Parisian officials' reaction to the monument's nudity. Epstein returned to the cemetery one evening and found that the testicles on the statue had been covered by plaster, as the size of the testicles was considered unusual. The monument was under police surveillance and Epstein found he could only continue his work upon it after bribing a police officer to look away, but the work was sporadic and the tarpaulin was replaced at night. Eventually, as compromise, under Robert Ross' instruction, a bronze plaque similar to the shape of a butterfly was placed upon the testicles of the monument and it was unveiled in early August 1914 by the occultist and poet Aleister Crowley. Epstein was furious that his work had been altered without his consent and refused to attend the unveiling. A few weeks later, Aleister Crowley approached Epstein in a café in Paris, and around his neck was a bronze butterfly – he informed Epstein that his work was now on display as he intended.

The testicles were removed in an act of vandalism in 1961. It is said that the cemetery manager used them as a paperweight. They are now missing. In 2000, Leon Johnson, a multimedia artist, installed a silver prosthesis to replace them.

The tomb with modern glass barrier

The epitaph is a verse from The Ballad of Reading Gaol:

And alien tears will fill for him
Pity's long-broken urn,
For his mourners will be outcast men,
And outcasts always mourn.

=== Kissing the tomb ===
Today, the monument is viewed by thousands of visitors every year. A tradition developed whereby visitors would kiss the tomb after applying lipstick to their mouth, thereby leaving a "print" of their kiss. The stone has also been covered in graffiti, almost exclusively letters of love to the author, but this is not as damaging as the lipstick kisses. Lipstick contains animal fat, which sinks into the stone and causes permanent damage. Cleaning operations to remove the lipstick grease have caused the stone to become more porous. It is therefore even harder to clean in subsequent attempts, necessitating more drastic and surface-damaging procedures. A fine of €9,000 was created to deter fans, but as many of them were tourists who could leave before being brought to court this did little to stop the practice. In 2011, the creation of a glass barrier was begun, to make the monument "kiss-proof". It was completed in 2014. However, it only covers the lower half of the tomb. As Ireland's Office of Public Works considers the tomb an Irish monument overseas, it has paid for the cleaning and the barrier.

The act of kissing the tomb has inspired a varied response from Oscar Wilde's supporters. Wilde's grandson Merlin Holland, who is partially responsible for the tomb's upkeep, has said on the subject that "Unthinking vulgar people have defaced the tomb forever." The producer Marc Overton, who views Wilde as a personal hero, has been quoted saying he found the lipstick kisses disgusting. On the other side of this discussion, the architectural historian Lisa Marie has called this an act of devotion and a "fitting monument to a great decadent and aesthete." Two years after the barrier was erected, Stephen Fry mentioned the practice of kissing Oscar Wilde's tomb in a speech on Wilde given at the Jaipur Literature Festival:

Here's this man who believed when he died that his name would be toxic for generations to come. For hundreds of years his work wouldn't be read. He would stand for nothing but perversion. Utter disgust of a society that couldn't bear people like him.....His tomb in Père Lachaise Cemetery, in Paris. It had to be restored because the polished stone of its surface had corroded through kissing. Thousand and thousands. .... Wouldn't it be allowed once to just wake him up for five minutes just to tell him that, then he can go back to sleep again?

== Sketches ==
A number of Epstein's sketches for the work have survived, some in private collections and some in galleries, including a profile of the side view in the Garman Ryan Collection at The New Art Gallery Walsall.

== See also ==
- List of sculptures by Jacob Epstein
