= Rosemary Rutherford =

British artist (1912-1970)

- Born: 1 September 1912; Kings Norton, England
- Died: 20 June 1972 (aged 59); Lambeth, London
- Education: Slade School of Fine Art
- Known for: Painting, stained-glass artist

Rosemary Ellen Rutherford (1 September 1912—20 June 1972) was a British artist notable for her paintings and stained glass designs.

== Biography ==
Rutherford was born at Kings Norton in Worcestershire and spent part of her childhood in Broomfield near Chelmsford where her father, who was originally from County Down, was a church rector. Rutherford subsequently studied at the Slade School of Fine Art in London and then took a teaching post in Colchester.

During World War II, Rutherford was a volunteer with the Red Cross undertaking a variety of duties, including driving a mobile canteen to military sites. She also worked as a nurse with a Voluntary Aid Detachment, VAD, unit attached to the Royal Navy. She received a drawing permit from the War Artists' Advisory Committee to record the work of her fellow VAD nurses and their patients.

After the war, Rutherford spent some time helping Cedric Morris and Arthur Lett-Haines in running the East Anglian School of Painting and Drawing. She established a studio at Walsham le Willows, where her brother was the local vicar, and designed a number of stained glass windows for churches in Essex and Suffolk while continuing to paint still-life and figure pictures. She exhibited paintings at the Royal Academy on at least two occasions, in 1937 and 1947, with the New English Art Club and was elected a member of the Art Workers Guild in 1970. Rutherford died at Lambeth in London in 1972 and a memorial exhibition was held at The Minories gallery in Colchester the same year. Several British public collections hold examples of her work including the National Maritime Museum, the Ingram Collection of Modern British Art and the Imperial War Museum in London.
