= Gage Earle Freeman =

English clergyman (1820–1903)

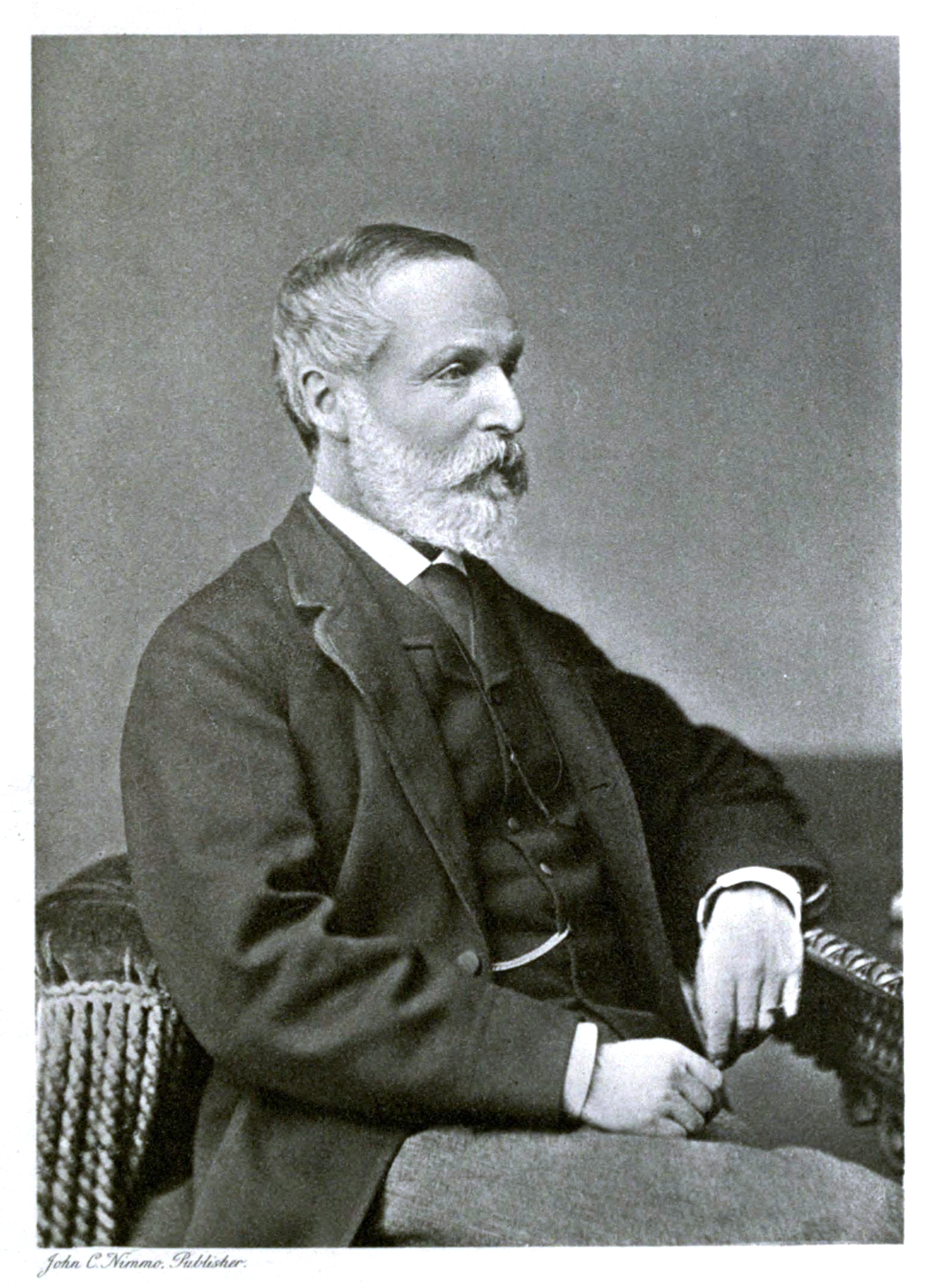
- Gage Earle Freeman, 1881 photograph
- Born: 3 June 1820; Tamworth, Staffordshire
- Died: 15 December 1903 (aged 83); Askham
- Education: St John's College, Cambridge
- Occupation: vicar
- Known for: hawking

Gage Earle Freeman (1820–1903) was an English clergyman, known as a writer on falconry.

== Life ==
Born on 3 June 1820 at Tamworth, Staffordshire, was son of Capt. Charles Earle Freeman of the 69th Regiment by his wife Mary Parsons. After private education he was admitted a pensioner at St John's College, Cambridge, on 8 July 1840, and graduated B.A. in 1845, proceeding M.A. in 1850.

Ordained deacon in 1846 and priest in 1847, Freeman held a curacy at Geddington, Northamptonshire, from 1846 to 1854, and the perpetual cure of Emmanuel Church, Bolton-le-Moors, from 1854 to 1856. He was then incumbent of Macclesfield Forest with Clough, Cheshire, till 1889, when he became vicar of Askham, near Penrith, and private chaplain to the Earl of Lonsdale. This living he held for the rest of his life.

Freeman died at the vicarage, Askham, on 15 December 1903, and was buried at Macclesfield Forest Chapel.

== Hawking ==
Freeman was a devotee of hawking, introduced to the sport by William Brodrick of Belford, Northumberland (later of Chudleigh). In Northamptonshire he enjoyed his first experience with a kestrel-hawk, equipped with a hood of home manufacture, and he afterwards flew sparrowhawks, merlins and peregrine falcons at pigeons and larks.

In his isolated Cheshire parish, Freeman hawked grouse with peregrines on Buxton Moor; also at Swythamley, the property of his friend, Philip Brocklehurst of Swythamley Park, Staffordshire. Next to peregrines, Freeman preferred goshawks, with which he killed hares and rabbits, with or without ferrets. Lord Lilford praised Freeman's influence on English falconers.

== Works ==
To The Field, Freeman contributed articles on falconry for a quarter of a century, as "Peregrine", and on them he based two books:

- Falconry; its Claims, History, and Practice (1859), written with Francis Henry Salvin; Freeman had the main share in this handbook for beginners, with plates by Joseph Wolf;
- Practical Falconry; and how I became a Falconer (1869), more discursive.

Freeman contributed the section on "Falcons and Falconry" to Lord Lilford on Birds (ed. A. Trevor-Battye, 1903); and had an essay printed in connection with falconry and the opening of Alexandra Park, London (1871).

In later life Freeman wrote four Seatonian Prizes for his poems: The Transfiguration (1882), Jericho (1888), Damascus (1893), and The Broad and the Narrow Way (1894). He also published Five Christmas Poems (1860, reprinted from The Field, with additions, and Mount Carmel, a Story of English Life (1867).

== Family ==
Freeman was twice married:

1. On 5 January 1848 to Christiana (died 1886), daughter of John Slade of Little Lever, Bolton-le-Moors, with whom he had eight sons and two daughters;
2. In April 1891 to Mary, daughter of Francis William Ashton, cotton-spinner and calico printer, of Hyde, Cheshire, who survived him.

== Notes ==
Attribution

This article incorporates text from a publication now in the public domain: Lee, Sidney, ed. (1912). "Freeman, Gage Earle". Dictionary of National Biography (2nd supplement). Vol. 12. London: Smith, Elder & Co.
