= Chris Ingram =

British businessman, entrepreneur and art collector (born 1943)

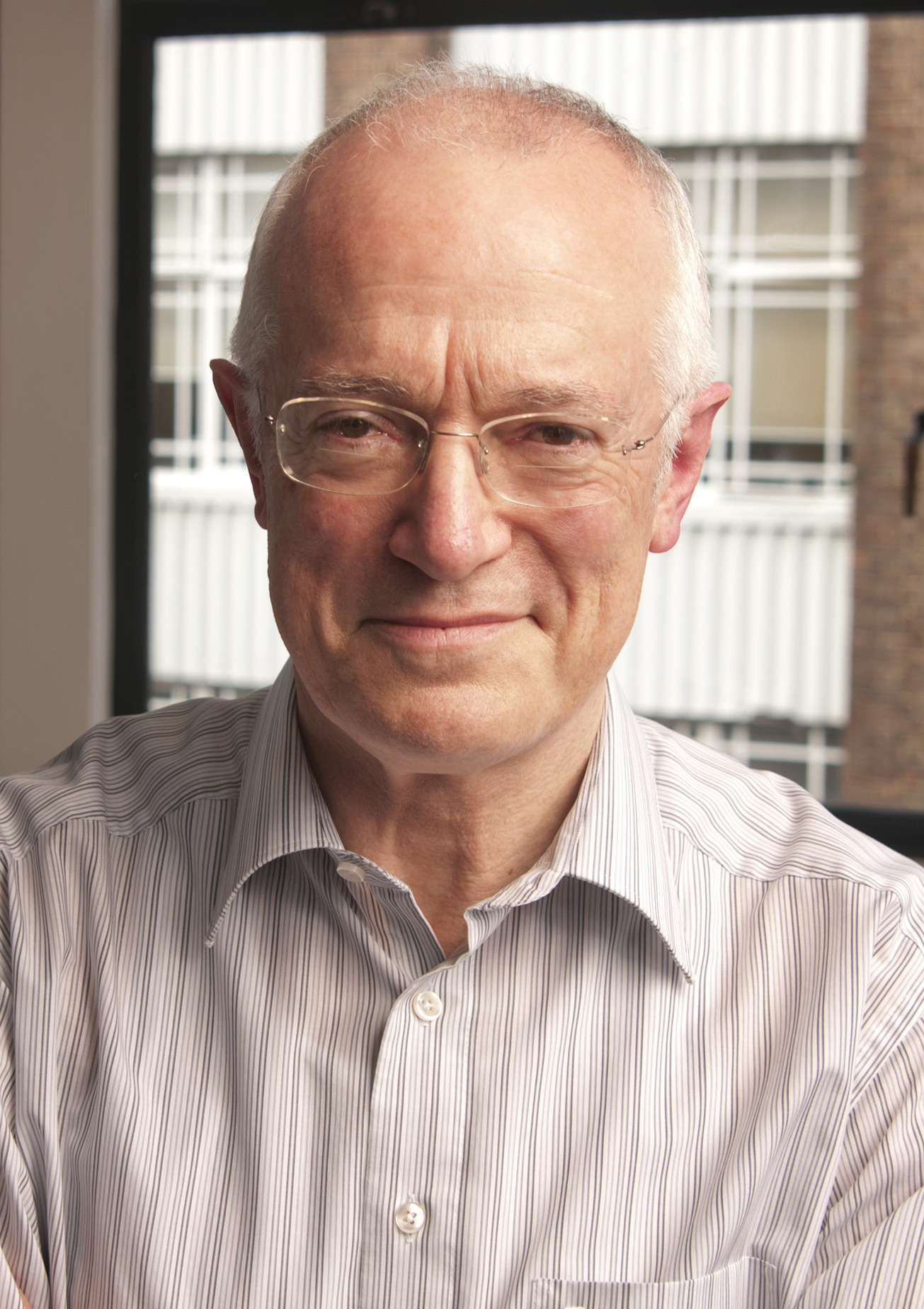
- Born: 9 June 1943 (age 83); Woking, Surrey, England
- Occupation: Media entrepreneur
- Website: ingramenterprise.com

Chris Ingram (born 9 June 1943) is a British businessman, entrepreneur and art collector with strong benevolent links to Woking.

== Early life ==
Chris Ingram is one of four children and the only son born to Thomas and Gladys Ingram. His father was a Police Inspector in the Surrey Constabulary which, at that time, involved many relocations around West Surrey.

He attended Woking Grammar School; having obtained six O'Levels of mediocre grades, he left sixth form abruptly after only six months to become a messenger boy at a London advertising agency.

== Advertising career ==
Ingram started his advertising career in 1960, aged 16 at Pictorial Publicity. Six months later, after the agency was taken over by John Pearce and Ronnie Dickenson, Collett Dickenson Pearce ("CPD") was formed. CPD rapidly became world-famous for its creative advertising. The media department in which Ingram then worked as a junior was a service department to the main creative agency.

Ingram then moved between several advertising agencies (including Greenlys where he met his wife, Janet).

In 1964 he joined KMP, one of the hot agencies of the 1960s. The freedom and encouragement of the principals resulted in his becoming a board director aged 26 years. KMP was floated on the London Stock Exchange in 1969 and subsequently embarked on a hasty acquisition spree. At Ingram's prompting, the by-then group of ad agencies (KIMPHER) formed a stand-alone media company, 'The Media Department', in 1972, which was to be the forerunner of the modern media agency, splitting for the first time, the media and creative functions of the full-service advertising agency.

The KIMPHER Group was badly hit by the three-day week and Ingram left in 1976 to start Chris Ingram Associates (CIA). After a shaky start, when there was very limited demand for the concept of a specialist media agency, the company later gained traction and expanded rapidly through the 1980s. CIA floated on the Stock Exchange in 1989. A series of rapid acquisitions commenced in 1993 to create a European network of agencies reflecting the emerging 'Single Market'.

During this period the idea of a stand-alone media company became gradually accepted as the norm. The Financial Times((')) analysis in 2000 of the previous decade showed that CIA was the world's best performing advertising stock of the 1990s.

Ingram was judged 'London Entrepreneur of the Year' in 2000 in the Ernst & Young awards and later, Business Services UK Winner.

By now CIA (with a holding company, Tempus) was employing 2,600 people in 67 offices across 29 countries with a turnover of $3 billion. However, the company was not truly global and in 1998 all the major agencies had decided to join the trend of the separation of creative from media, resulting in the appearance of much larger competitors in the market.

Meantime, WPP was progressively increasing its stake in the publicly quoted Tempus, and by 2001 it was approaching 25%.

The board of Tempus took the covert decision to sell the company. After a period of courtship, Havas, which also had an incomplete global network, made a bid based on a multiple of 34 pre-tax profits. A battle ensued between WPP and Havas which ended abruptly following the terrorist attacks of 9/11. Havas withdrew immediately, leaving WPP's bid as the only one.

A series of historic appeals was made by WPP, who claimed a material adverse change (called 'a MAC Attack' in the Financial Times at that time). After two appeals to the Stock Exchange, WPP was forced to follow through with its bid, netting £432 million cash for Tempus shareholders on 6 November 2001.

== Life after CIA ==
Ingram re-entered the advertising and marketing sector in 2003 with The Ingram Partnership, a strategic brand consultancy that was positioned to be "the McKinsey of Marketing" with a series of high-profile hirings. Despite achieving considerable publicity and client plaudits, the venture was not a success. Losses accumulated and Ingram closed the London office in 2007. He retained a 30% interest in the New York office and sold the Hong Kong office back to one of the founders.

In parallel with the launch of The Ingram Partnership, Ingram set up a very small investment fund, Genesis Investments, financed from the sale of CIA with his son Jonathan, to make eight to ten investments of approx £0.5m each in companies in the media sector.

The last investment was in Decision Technologies Limited (whose main brand is Consumer Choices), a price comparison site. At the same time Jonathan Ingram joined as COO. This company was judged to be No. 24 in the Sunday Times TechTrack100 of 2011.

Ingram set up Ingram Enterprise in 2007 to advise, support and invest in small businesses. These range from micro businesses in East Africa to emerging businesses in London and New York, whether start-ups or those transitioning from small to medium-sized.

From 2009 to 2013 he was chairman of Sports Revolution, a UK-based sports media and marketing agency. In 2009, Ingram bought out the majority shareholder, Pi Capital. The business expanded rapidly to add consultancy and in-stadia digital media. In September 2012, Steve Lansdown (co-founder of Hargreaves Lansdown and owner of Bristol City Football Club), acquired a significant minority through his investment vehicle, STIG.

In 2014, Ingram became an Enterprise Fellow of The Prince's Trust

== London Business School ==
Although not an alumnus, Ingram is closely involved with the Innovation and Entrepreneurship Faculty at London Business School where he is a major donor. Recently he has joined the Deloitte Institute of Innovation and Entrepreneurship at The School.

In its original guise as the Foundation for Entrepreneurial Management, Ingram was involved from the outset and eventually served as Acting chairman. He provided the seed funding for a joint venture between the University of Arts and London Business School: The Centre for Creative Business. This was a HEFCE funded initiative to bring business skills to the creative industry. He served as chairman on this joint venture from 2007 to 2008 and was made an Honorary Fellow in 2007.

== Woking Football Club ==
Ingram became chairman of his boyhood club Woking F.C. in 2002, saving the club from administration. He still continues, as chairman of the holding company, to try to secure Woking's long-term financial stability through redevelopment of the ground.

== Art ==
Ingram started to collect art seriously in 2000 and soon after that he chose to specialise in Modern British Art. It was after the sale of Tempus to WPP on 6 November 2001, that he was able to rapidly boost his collection.

The collection expanded into his office space at The Ingram Partnership (2003–2007) and when the company closed, the collection ended up in storage at Christies in Nine Elms. Coincidentally, Woking Borough Council asked him to help fund a new gallery and museum which prompted the idea to base the collection at a public place for the public's benefit.

The new gallery was named The Lightbox which won the Art Fund prize in 2008 and now houses the majority of the 450 piece Ingram Collection with a regular programme of free exhibitions. Ingram is keen that as many people as possible enjoy the collection and encourages an active loan programme, the key pieces of sculpture in The Ingram Collection were exhibited at Sotheby's in January 2011. A further 17 pieces were also loaned to the Royal College of Arts for their 175th Anniversary Show in October 2012.

The collection is now actively used in the community, helping schools, prisons and mental health organisations.
