= David Remfry =

English painter (born 1942)

David Remfry MBE RA RWS
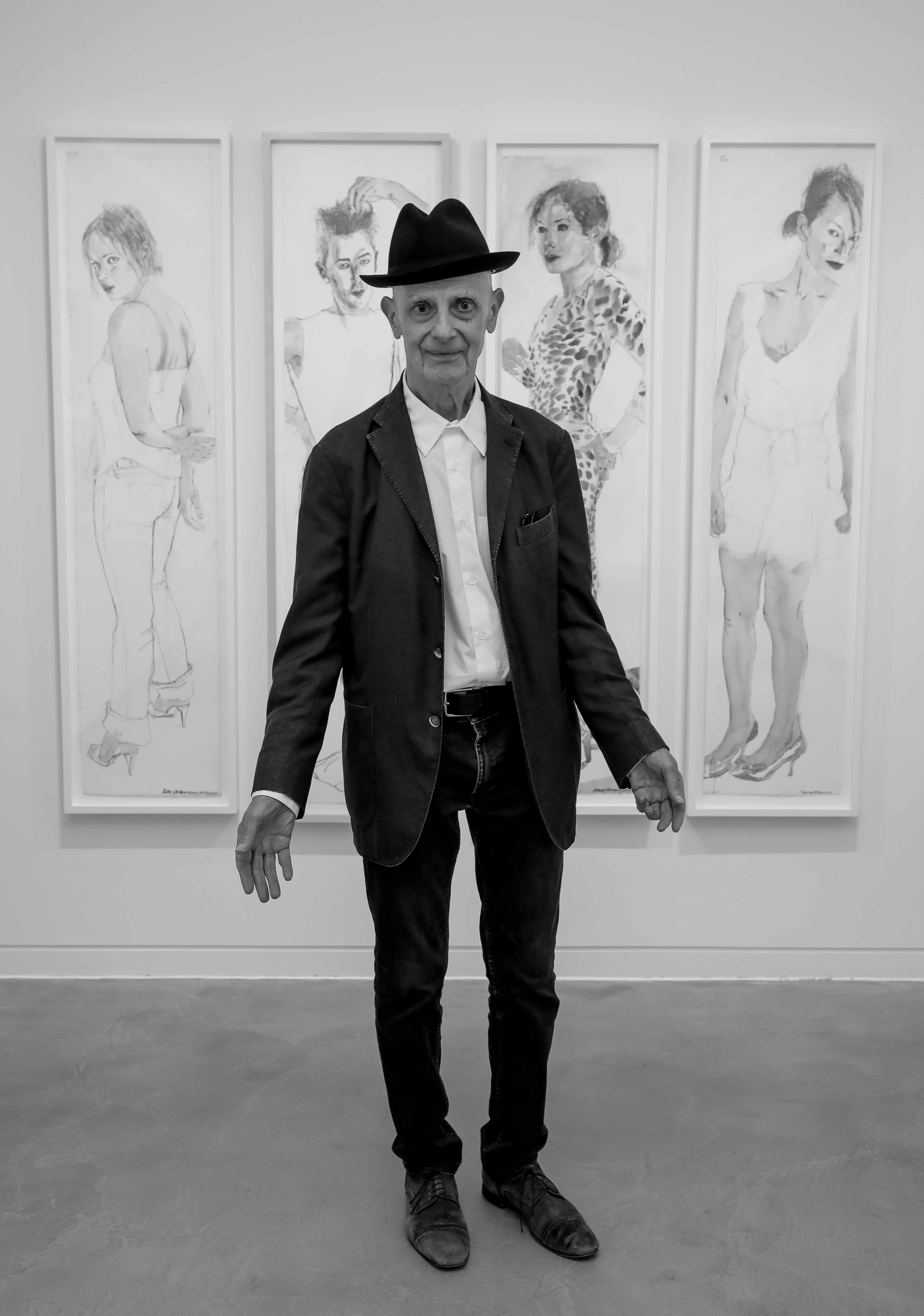
- Born: July 1942 (age 84); Worthing, West Sussex, England
- Education: Hull College of Arts and Crafts (1959–64)
- Known for: Drawing; oil painting; watercolour
- Website: davidremfry.com

David Remfry MBE RA RWS (born 1942 in Worthing, England) is a British painter and curator. He served as the Eranda Professor of Drawing at the Royal Academy Schools from 2016 to 2018 and as a competition judge for the Royal Academy of Arts Charles Wollaston Award in 2021. In 2023 he coordinated the Royal Academy of Arts Summer Exhibition. A retrospective of Remfry’s work, curated by Dr Gerardine Mulcahy-Parker, was planned for 2025 at Beverley Art Gallery, East Riding.

== Career ==
Remfry moved to Hull aged five and attended Hull College of Art from 1959 to 1964 before moving to London. His first solo show was in London at the Grafton Gallery in 1973 and in the United States at the Ankrum Gallery, Los Angeles in 1980. He has exhibited since then at galleries in London, Holland, New York, Los Angeles and Florida. In 2002 Alanna Heiss curated a show of his work at MoMA PS1, New York. Other exhibitions include the Boca Raton Museum of Art, 1999 and 2002 Butler Institute of American Art, 2003, Ohio, and the Museum of Art - DeLand, 2017 Orlando.

Solo museum shows in the UK include the Usher Gallery, Lincoln (2023), Rugby Art Gallery and Museum, Rugby (2023), the inaugural exhibition at the new Royal Watercolour Society Gallery in Whitcomb Street, London (2022), The Lightbox, Woking (2020-21), Pallant House Gallery, Chichester (2015), the Fitzwilliam Museum, Cambridge (2005), Ferens Art Gallery, Hull, (1975 and 2005), Middlesbrough Art Gallery, the National Portrait Gallery (1992) and the Victoria and Albert Museum, London (2003). The National Portrait Gallery commissioned Remfry to paint Sir John Gielgud in 1981 and also acquired his watercolor of Jean Muir.

== Awards ==
Remfry was elected a member of the Royal Watercolour Society in 1987. In 2001 he was awarded the M.B.E. for services to British Art in America by Queen Elizabeth II. In 2006 he was elected a Member of the Royal Academy of Arts, London and in 2007 he was invited to receive Honorary Doctorate of Arts by the University of Lincoln. Remfry was awarded the Hugh Casson Drawing Prize at the 2010 Summer Exhibition and was Professor of Drawing at the Royal Academy Schools from 2016 to 2018.

== New York City ==
In 1994 Remfry was offered an exhibition at the Tatistcheff Gallery on 57th Street. He moved to the Hotel Chelsea on 23rd Street in 1995 and took a studio in the recently converted 526 West 26th Street building in Chelsea. The exhibition Gotham Nights opened at Tatistcheff on 30 January 1996. In the catalogue Remfry said This is an extraordinary city. It oozes vitality. It is vital because it is dangerous. It is dangerous because it throws out infinite possibilities, many wonderful and some hazardous. It is a city of paradox; cruelty and compassion side by side. There are people who lead lives dedicated to others. There are some dedicated to taking from others. You run to survive, nobody coasts. They say the city never sleeps. It does, but only cat naps in the early hours and even then its cacophony haunts your own sleep.

== Dancers ==
In 2002 George Bolge, Director of the Boca Raton Museum of Art curated the exhibition David Remfry Dancers. A body of work begun by Remfry in 1985 that numbered over 80 paintings and drawings, many of which had not been exhibited before. Remfry was working almost exclusively on paper, but not in the conventional way of small, polite landscapes. His watercolors are large; some single-figure pieces are practically life-size, and his subjects are decidedly urban.

To coincide with the exhibition a book, Dancers, was published by the Boca Raton Museum of Art. It serves as a biographical and critical study of the work, with essays by Edward Lucie-Smith, Dore Ashton and Carter Ratcliff, and provides a definitive mid-career survey of an increasingly important and original figure in British and American Art.

The exhibition toured to the Butler Museum of Art, Ohio, (2003) The Fitzwilliam Museum, Cambridge (2005) and the Ferens Art Gallery, Hull (2005/6).

== People and Dogs Drawn Together ==
In his studio at the Hotel Chelsea, Remfry became fascinated by the relationships that develop between dogs and their owners. His drawings and watercolours reveal the mutual understanding and sympathy of these partnerships. The drawings depict actors including Ethan Hawke (and Nina), Susan Sarandon (with Penny and Rigby) and Alan Cumming (with Honey) and several Hotel Chelsea neighbours among them April Barton (with Ava), Laura Kaplan (with Oscar) and Drew Straub (with Fuzzy) the philanthropist Agnes Gund (with Tina, Giotto and Bronzino) and Mayer Rus (with Louise).

In 2015 the Royal Academy of Arts, London published the book We Think The World of You, People and Dogs Drawn Together. ISBN 978-1-910350-17-1. Distributed outside the United States and Canada by Thames & Hudson, Ltd London and distributed in the United States and Canada by Harry N. Abrams, Inc, New York.

A series of films were produced for the exhibition People and Dogs Drawn Together directed by Simeon Lumgair.

== Drawings for Stella McCartney ==
In 2002 Stella McCartney commissioned Remfry to produce a series of drawings of fashion model Tetyana Brazhnyk to be used in the advertising campaign to launch the first collection of her own fashion house in association with Absolut Vodka (which has a history of dramatic and provocative advertising incorporating the work of contemporary artists). McCartney was prompted to commission Remfry after seeing one of his drawings on the cover of the second edition of "The Image" magazine from 1972. (Peter Blake produced the first cover). The retro styling and the sensual mood of these drawings are characteristic of Remfry's work, and also of Stella McCartney's designs, which are inspired by 1960s and 70s fashions.

In addition to appearing in all major fashion magazines, a giant 10-story poster appeared on the side of the Mondrian Hotel LA to coincide with the launch of the project at the Chateau Marmont. McCartney said "Absolut has a long history of collaborating with fashion designers, photographers, painters and other visual artists and I'm excited to join their ranks," said Stella. "I'm particularly excited because this marks the first time that drawings have been used in the campaign."

In September 2003 the Victoria and Albert Museum, London opened Fashion into Art: David Remfry Drawings for Stella McCartney curated by Fiona Leslie. McCartney said on that occasion, "David uses the pencil in a bold and direct way. Yet the result is human, feminine and delicate. These drawings captured a moment in fashion. You can feel the sexual chemistry between the artist and his muse, a style of drawing not often seen, and I admire him for keeping it alive".

A book, Fashion into Art: David Remfry Drawings for Stella McCartney accompanied the exhibition and features an interview with the artist by Lance Esplund ISBN 0971397244.

== Work in public collections ==
- Bass Museum of Art, Florida
- Beverley Art Gallery
- Boca Raton Museum of Art, Florida
- British Museum, London
- Butler Institute of American Art, Youngstown, Ohio
- Contemporary Art Society, London
- Fitzwilliam Museum, Cambridge, England
- Government Art Collection, UK
- Ingram Collection of Modern British Art, UK
- Leeds Art Gallery, Leeds
- Middlesbrough Institute of Modern Art, mima England
- Minnesota Museum of American Art, Saint Paul
- National Portrait Gallery, London
- New Orleans Museum of Art
- Orlando Museum of Art, Florida
- Pallant House Gallery, Chichester
- The Patricia and Phillip Frost Art Museum, Florida International University, Miami
- Museo Rayo, Roldanillo, Colombia
- Royal Academy of Arts, London
- Royal Collection, Windsor, England
- Royal Watercolour Society, London
- Rugby Art Gallery and Museum, Rugby
- Swarthmore College, Swarthmore, Pennsylvania
- Towner Art Gallery, Eastbourne, England
- Victoria and Albert Museum, London
- Whitworth Art Gallery, Manchester, England
