= Ambrose McEvoy =

English painter

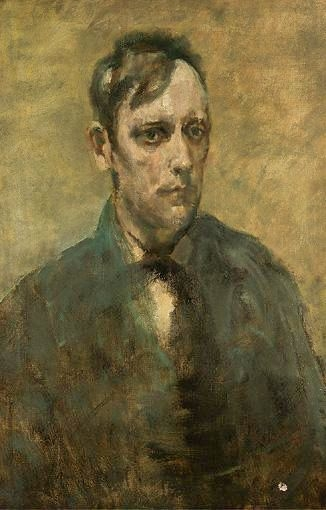
Self-portrait

Arthur Ambrose McEvoy ARA (12 August 1877 – 4 January 1927) was an English artist. His early works are landscapes and interiors with figures, in a style influenced by James McNeill Whistler. Later he gained success as a portrait painter, mainly of women and often in watercolour.

== Biography ==
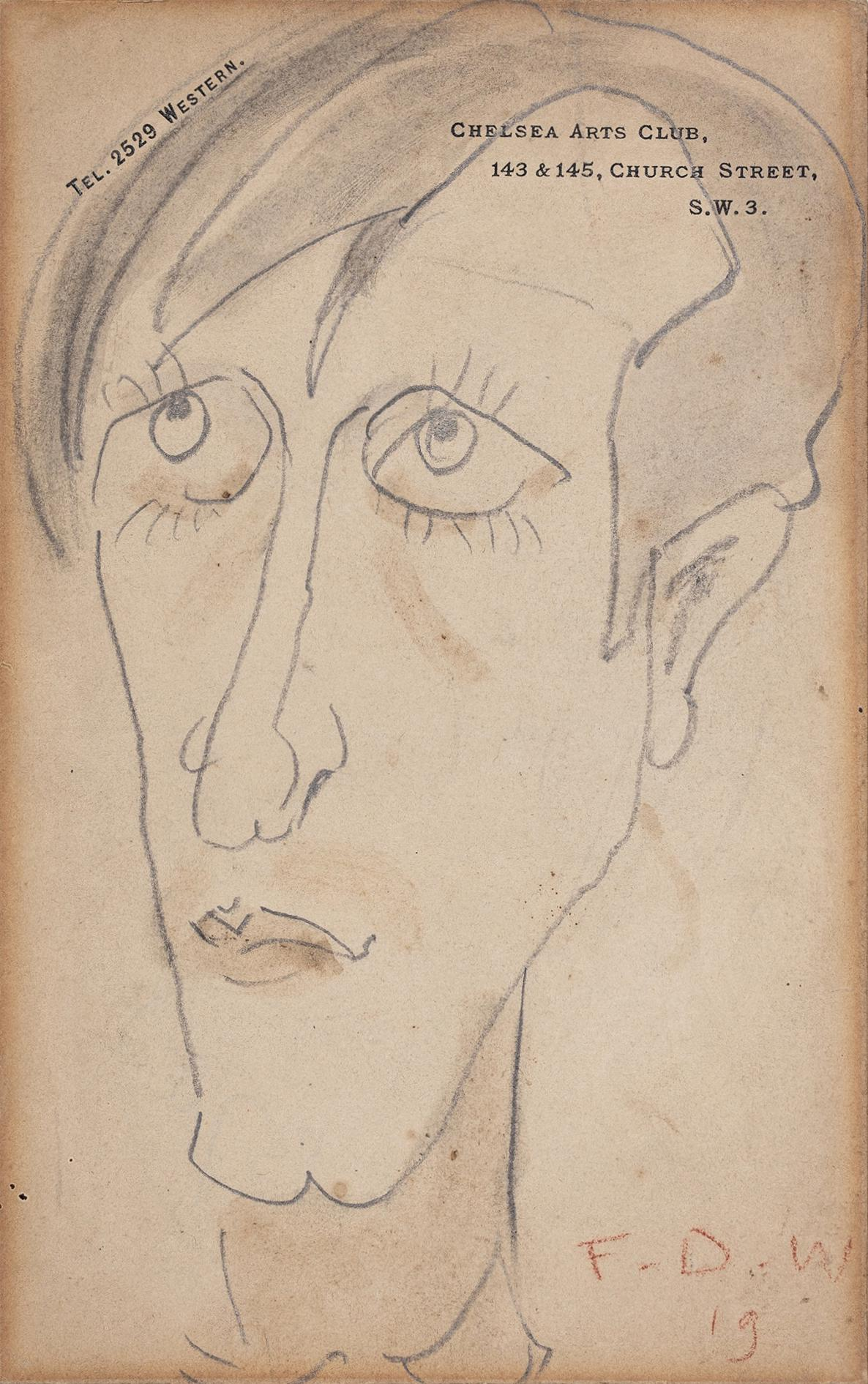
Ambrose McEvoy; a caricature portrait (1919), by Francis Derwent Wood, on Chelsea Arts Club letterhead paper

McEvoy was born and baptised in Crudwell, Wiltshire, in 1877, the son of Charles Ambrose McEvoy, a Scottish engineer, and his wife Mary Jane, although his parents’ address was given as 3 Carlisle Street, Soho Square, London. His younger brother Charles became a playwright. Encouraged by Whistler, who spotted his talent early on, McEvoy enrolled at the Slade School of Fine Art in London when he was fifteen. At the Slade he was part of the group around Augustus John and William Orpen. McEvoy had the reputation for a fine technical skill in oils, learnt from study with Whistler. He later worked with Walter Sickert in Dieppe. While at the Slade he was fellow pupil of Gwen John, with whom he had an unhappy affair.

From 1900 he exhibited at the New English Art Club (NEAC), and became a member in 1902. In the same year he married the painter Mary Edwards (1870–1941). In 1907 he held a one-person exhibition at the Carfax Gallery. In 1911 he was a founder-member of the National Portrait Society, and in 1913 he became a member of the International Society. The works that he exhibited at the NEAC were landscapes and interiors. He worked as the Slade Assistant during the early years of the war. It was at this time that McEvoy established a reputation as a portrait painter of fashionable society beauties, often painted in watercolour in a rapid, sketchy style.

During the First World War, McEvoy was attached to the Royal Naval Division from 1916 to 1918 and "painted a number of distinguished sailors and soldiers, now in the Imperial War Museum", and the National Maritime Museum.

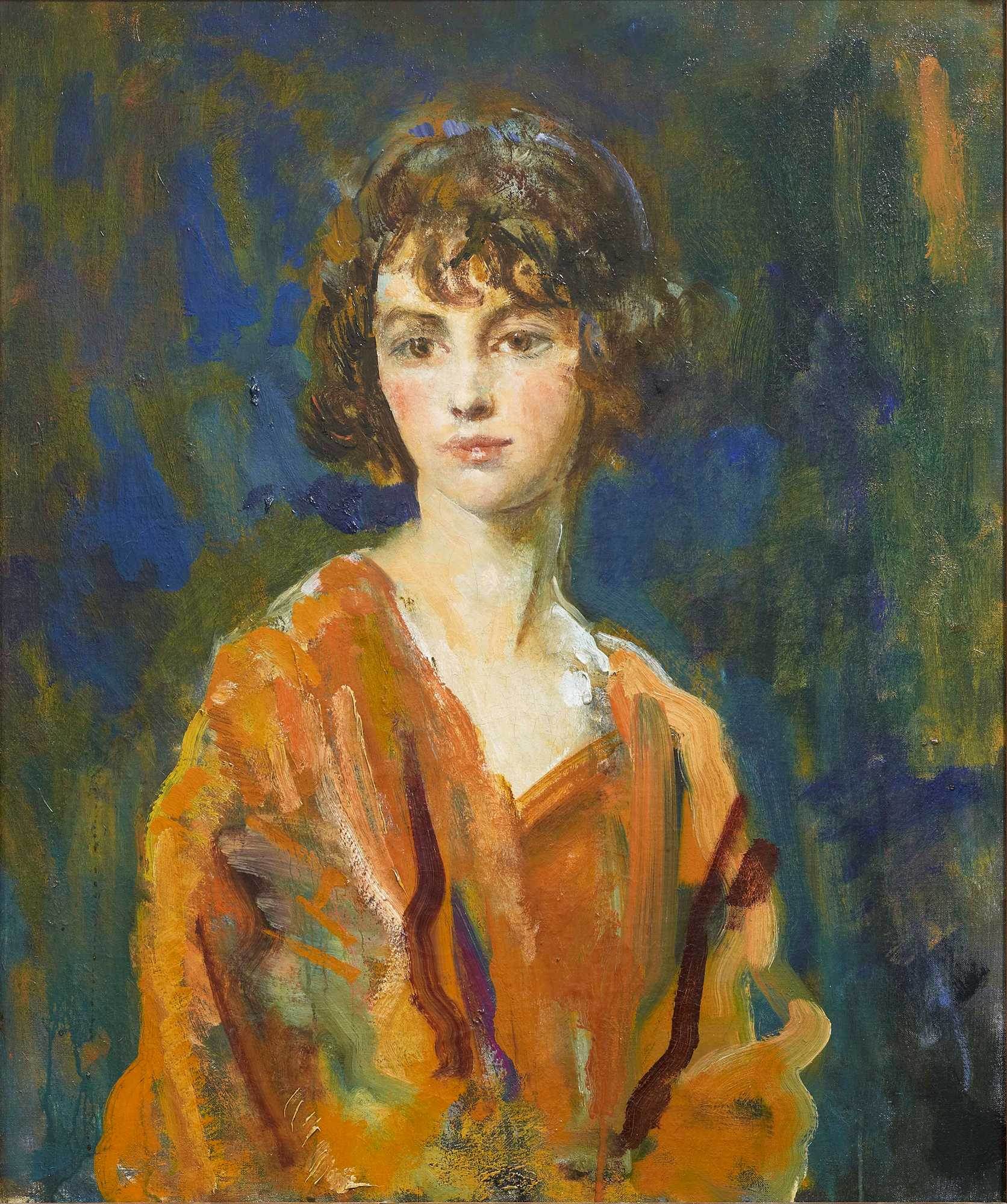
1920 - "Portrait of the Hon. Lois Sturt" by Ambrose McEvoy (Crudwell, Wilts, 1878-1927, London). Oil on canvas

McEvoy visited New York and exhibited there at the Duveen Galleries in 1920. In 1924 he was made an Associate of the Royal Academy and of the Royal Society of Portrait Painters, and of the Royal Watercolour Society in 1926. He also exhibited at the Grosvenor, Grafton and Leicester Galleries.

McEvoy died in Pimlico, London, on 4 January 1927. In 1928 he was represented in the Royal Academy Late Members Exhibition. In 1933 he was memorialised together with Orpen and Charles Ricketts in an exhibition in Manchester.

A major retrospective exhibition was held at the Philip Mould Gallery on Pall Mall from November to January 2019. It included newly rediscovered works.

== Bibliography ==
- Chamot, Mary, Farr Dennis, and Butlin, Martin, The Modern British Paintings, Drawings and Sculpture, London 1964, II
- Johnson, Claude, (ed.), The Works of Ambrose McEvoy from 1900 to May 1919, 1919
- R[eginald]. M. Y.G.[leadowe], Ambrose McEvoy, 1924
- 'Wigs', The Work of Ambrose McEvoy, 1923
