= Francis Henry Salvin =

English writer

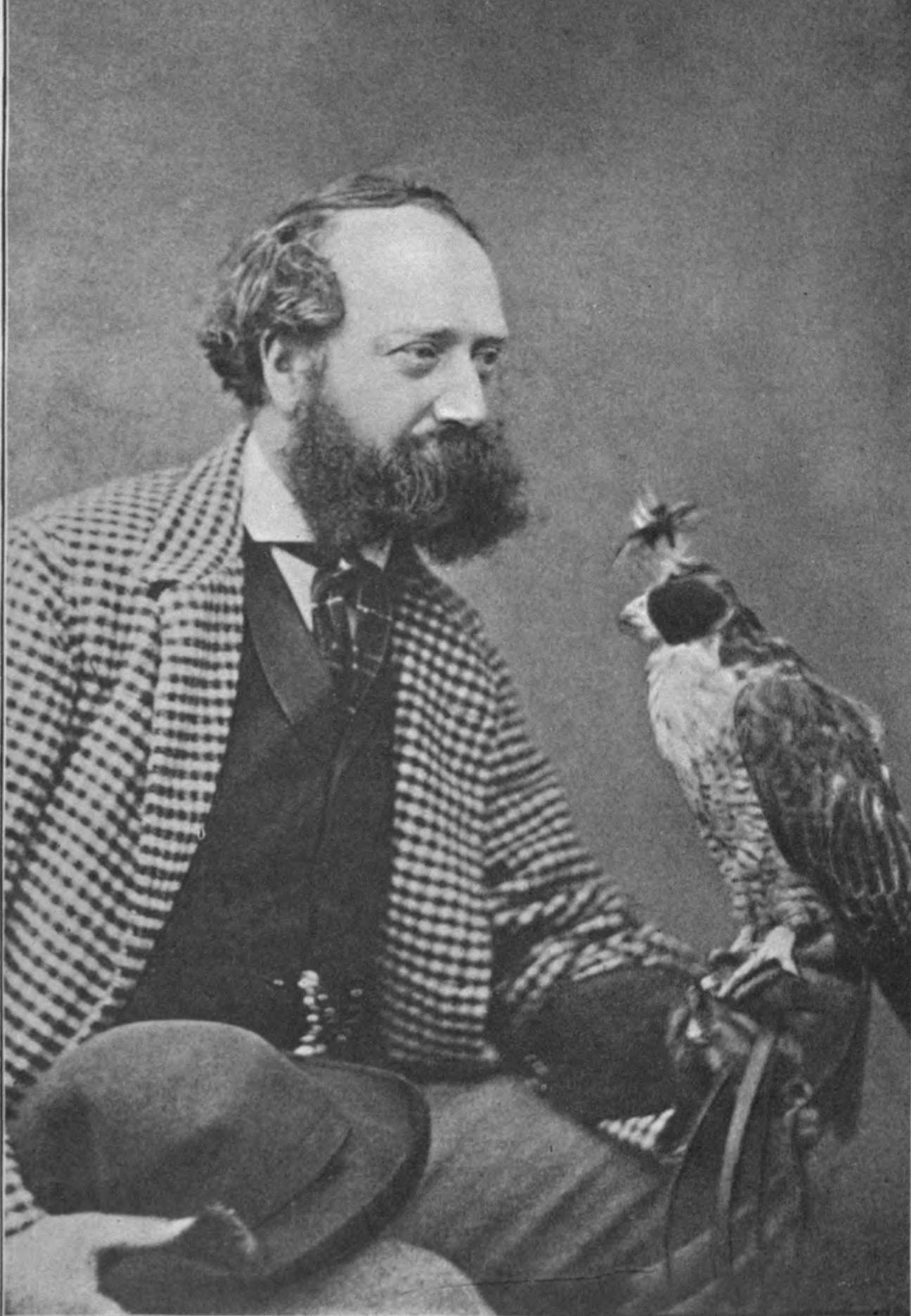
Salvin with a falcon, which is wearing a hood and jesses

Francis Henry Salvin (1817–1904) was an English writer on falconry and cormorant-fishing.

== Life ==
Born at Croxdale Hall on 4 April 1817, was fifth and youngest son of William Thomas Salvin, of Croxdale Hall, Durham, by his wife Anna Maria, daughter of John Webbe-Weston, of Sutton Place, Surrey. Educated at Ampleforth College, he served for several years in the militia, joining the 3rd battalion of the York and Lancaster Regiment in 1839 and retiring with the rank of captain in 1864.

In 1857 Salvin inherited from his uncle, Thomas Monnington Webbe-Weston, the Tudor mansion Sutton Place, Surrey, but usually lived at Whitmoor House on the estate. He trained young otters to follow him like dogs and sleep in his lap, and at one time kept a wild boar with collar and bell. He was active in field sports when past 70.

Salvin died unmarried on 2 October 1904, at the Manor House, Sutton Park, Guildford, and was buried in St. Edward's cemetery, Sutton Park.

== Field sports ==
=== Hawking ===
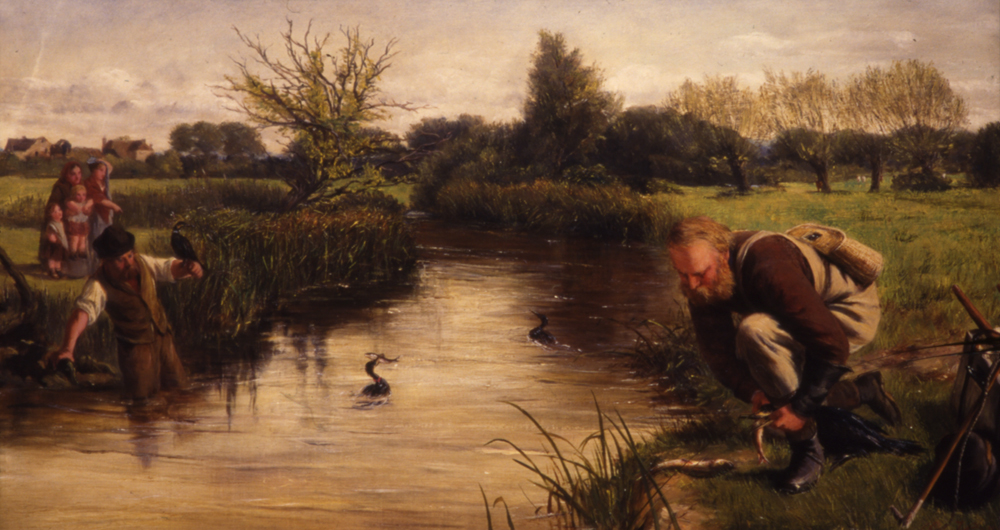
Fishing by Proxy, Salvin and his cormorants are represented in James Clarke Hook's painting

Salvin's early love of hawking was stimulated by an acquaintance with John Tong, assistant falconer to Thomas Thornton. In 1843 he made a hawking tour with John Pells, employed by the Hereditary Grand Falconer of England, through the north of England; and when quartered with his regiment in Ireland he used to fly falcons at rooks and magpies. He also for some years kept goshawks and made successful flights with them at mountain hares, rabbits and water hens. He invented a portable bow-perch for these birds. He was a prominent member from 1870 of the old Hawking Club which met on the Wiltshire Downs.

=== Cormorant fishing ===
Salvin was also the first to revive successfully in England the old sport of fishing with cormorants. His first and most famous bird was brought from Rotterdam and trained in 1847. He named it Izaac Walton "in honour of that bewitching author upon the piscatory art", the author of The Compleat Angler. After the bird's death, Salvin learned by dissection that Isaac was a female. Isaac was stuffed in 1847 by John Hancock and went to the Hancock Museum, Newcastle.

In 1849 Salvin took with four birds in 28 days some 1200 large fish at Driffield, Kilney, and other places in the north of England. In 1864, Salvin took three birds, Izaak Walton, Hobble Gobble, and Detective, to Corby Castle to demonstrate cormorant fishing.

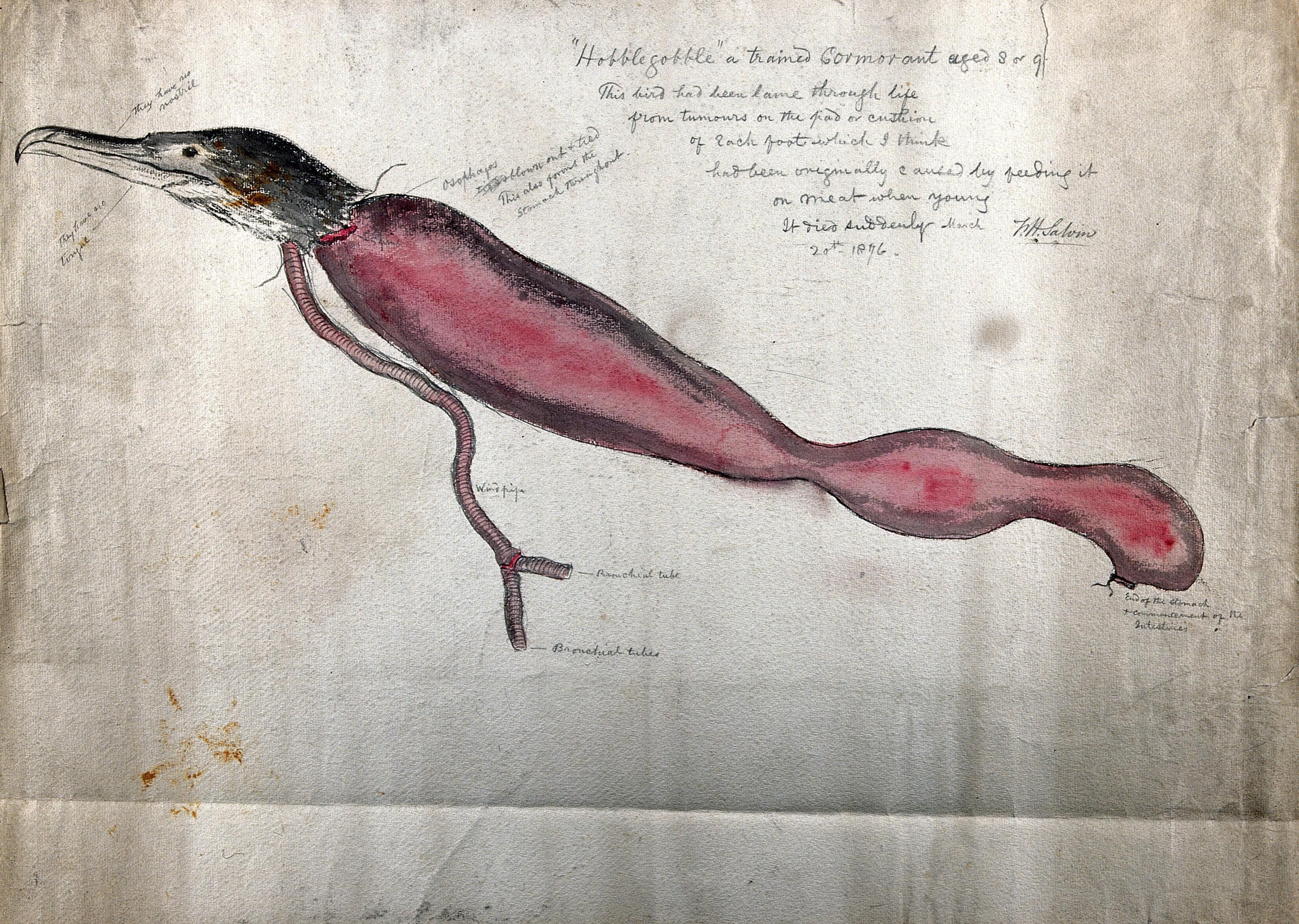
Salvin's post mortem watercolour image of Hobble Gobble.

In 1874, Savin appeared in a painting by James Clarke Hook (the painting was purchased by Aberdeen granite merchant, Alexander MacDonald). Hobble Gobble sat for a portrait by the same artist in 1873. Rosalie Hook described the bird as a "tolerably patient sitter but a troublesome guest as he insisted on fish diet without a particle of salt on it & I had to drive to Farnham for his dinner". Hobble Gobble was also given an autopsy upon its death in 1876.

Sub-Inspector, the first known cormorant bred in confinement, was exhibited at the Fisheries Exhibition, South Kensington, in 1883, and was sent to the London Zoological Gardens after Salvin's death, surviving until 1911.

Other birds included Hoang Ho and Kas-wang (named after the human Chinese role of Great Khan, this bird was also female), The Water Nymph, Pick-pocket and Artful Dodger.

== Works ==
Salvin, a contributor to The Field, collaborated in two works on falconry. The first, Falconry in the British Isles (1855; 2nd edit. 1873), with William Brodrick of Chudleigh, had figures of hawks drawn by Brodrick, and compared to the work of Joseph Wolf. Salvin also assisted Gage Earle Freeman with Falconry: its Claims, History, and Practice (1859), the Remarks on training the Otter and Cormorant appended to it being his.
