= Ingram Collection of Modern British Art =

The Ingram Collection
- Established: 2002
- Key holdings: Modern British Sculpture, Neo-Romantics, Dame Elisabeth Frink
- Collection size: 650 pieces
- Founder: Chris Ingram
- Director: Jo Baring
- Website: ingramcollection.com

The Ingram Collection of Modern British Art is a publicly accessible collection of Modern British art in the UK, available through a programme of loans and exhibitions. The collection was created by media entrepreneur and philanthropist Chris Ingram.

The collection comprises 650 artworks of which over 400 are by important artists of the Modern British era, among these Dame Elisabeth Frink, Dame Barbara Hepworth and Sir Eduardo Paolozzi.

== The collection ==
The collection spans over a hundred years of British art and includes works in oil and on paper, sculptures, installations and videos. The main focus of the collection is on the art movements which developed in the early and middle decades of the 20th century, art which responded to the influence of the two world wars, and art which challenged the usual and the regular. The collection features a broad base of artists with particularly strong groups of works by William Roberts, Edward Burra, Keith Vaughan, John Tunnard, John Craxton, and Richard Eurich. The sculpture holdings are significant, featuring works by artists such as, amongst others, Robert Adams, Kenneth Armitage, Reg Butler, Lynn Chadwick, Geoffrey Clarke, Robert Clatworthy, Sir Jacob Epstein, Eric Gill, Bernard Meadows, Eduardo Paolozzi, William Turnbull and Leon Underwood. The collection includes watercolour works by artists such as Eileen Agar, John Craxton, Mary Fedden, Elizabeth Frink, Terry Frost, David Remfry and Keith Vaughan.

The Ingram Collection also includes contemporary art, holding works by young and emerging artists as well as those who have now gained international reputations: Haroon Mirza, Suki Chan and Alexander Hoda. In 2016 The Ingram Collection established The Ingram Prize, an annual purchase prize which celebrates and supports the work and early careers of UK art school graduates.

== Selected artists from the Ingram Collection ==
- Robert Adams
- Eileen Agar
- John Aldridge
- Sybil Andrews
- Maxwell Ashby Armfield
- Kenneth Armitage
- John Armstrong
- Frank Auerbach
- Michael Ayrton
- John Banting
- Edward Bawden
- John Bellany
- Tony Bevan
- David Bomberg
- John Boyd
- John Bratby
- Ralph Brown
- Edward Burra
- Reg Butler
- Sir Anthony Caro
- David Carr
- Dora Carrington
- Lynn Chadwick
- Suki Chan
- Billy Childish
- Geoffrey Clarke
- Robert Clatworthy
- Cecil Collins
- Stephen Conroy
- John Craxton
- Ken Currie
- John Davies
- Sir Jacob Epstein
- Richard Eurich
- Mary Fedden
- Paul Feiler
- Clifford Fishwick
- Donald Hamilton Fraser
- Barnet Freedman
- Dame Elisabeth Frink
- Sir Terry Frost
- Henri Gaudier-Brzeska
- William Gear
- Tom Gentleman
- Mark Gertler
- Eric Gill
- Charles Ginner
- Derrick Greaves
- Robert Duckworth Greenham
- Dame Barbara Hepworth
- Josef Herman
- Patrick Heron
- Tristram Hillier
- Roger Hilton
- David Hockney
- Peter Howson
- James Hull
- Sir Augustus John
- Andrew Johnson
- Allen Jones
- David Jones
- Eric Kennington
- R.B. Kitaj
- Dame Laura Knight
- Jacob Kramer
- Henry Lamb
- Wyndham Lewis
- Alan Lowndes
- Peter McLaren
- Padraig MacMiadhachain
- Christopher Marvell
- Bernard Meadows
- John Minton
- Henry Moore
- John Nash
- C.R.W. Nevinson
- Mary Newcomb
- Ben Nicholson
- Winifred Nicholson
- Sir Eduardo Paolozzi
- Robin Philipson
- Glynn Philpot
- John Piper
- Cyril Power
- Dod Procter
- Eric Ravilious
- David Remfry
- Alan Reynolds
- Ceri Richards
- Ray Richardson
- Bridget Riley
- William Roberts
- Leonard Rosoman
- Rosemary Rutherford
- Michael Sandle
- William Scott
- John Skeaping
- Austin Osman Spare
- Ruskin Spear
- Gilbert Spencer
- Stanley Spencer
- Blair Hughes Stanton
- Graham Sutherland
- Margaret Thomas
- Julian Trevelyan
- John Tunnard
- William Turnbull
- Leon Underwood
- Keith Vaughan
- Carel Weight
- Bryan Wynter
