= Mary McEvoy (artist) =

British painter (1870–1941)

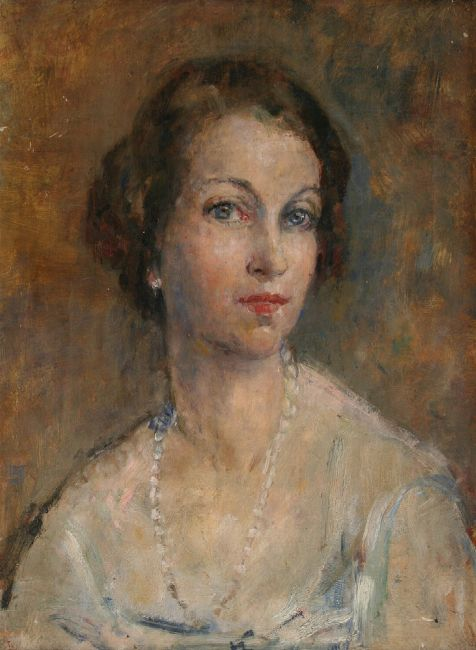
- A painting by Mary McEvoy
- Born: Mary Spencer Edwards; 22 October 1870; Freshford, Somerset, England
- Died: 4 November 1941 (aged 71); Freshford, Somerset
- Education: Slade School of Art
- Known for: Painting
- Spouse: Ambrose McEvoy (m.1902-1927, his death)

Mary Augusta McEvoy née Spencer Edwards (22 October 1870 – 4 November 1941) was a British artist known for her paintings of portraits, interiors and flowers.

== Biography ==
McEvoy was born in Freshford in Somerset and studied at the Slade School of Art in London. Between 1900 and 1906 she was a regular exhibitor with the New English Art Club. In 1902 she married the artist Ambrose McEvoy and in due course gave up a full-time art career although she worked with her husband on at least one major project. In 1909 Ambrose McEvoy was commissioned to paint a series of decorations for St Columba's Church, Long Tower in Derry which were to consist of three original works and twenty-two copies of bible scenes as depicted by Old Masters. While Ambrose created the three original pieces, it is believed that Mary worked on the twenty-two copies, finding suitable sources, making cartoons and then painting enlarged versions onto copper panels for the church.

After Ambrose died in 1927 Mary resumed painting and began exhibiting her work again. Between 1928 and 1938 she exhibited twelve works at the Royal Academy in London and also had works shown at the Paris Salon. During the 1930s Knoedlers Gallery in London showed a series of, mostly female, portraits by McEvoy. The Tate collection holds her 1901 painting Interior: Girl Reading and also a bust of her by the sculptor Jacob Epstein. Both the Hugh Lane Municipal Gallery of Modern Art in Dublin and the Southampton City Art Gallery hold examples of her later works.
