= Hopton Wood Stone =

Type of limestone

The Tomb of Oscar Wilde, made out of Hopton Wood Stone.

Hopton Wood Stone (also called Hopton-Wood Stone or Hoptonwood Stone) is a type of limestone quarried north of Hopton and west of Middleton-by-Wirksworth, Derbyshire, England.

The quarry was first owned by the Gell family and later by Hopton-Wood Stone Firms Ltd. The stone was called "England's premier decorative stone" and described as "remarkably and exceptionally pure limestone, almost identical to marble," with impurities at 0.02%.

== History ==
In 1870–72, John Marius Wilson's Imperial Gazetteer of England and Wales described Hopton as having "good building limestone, (which) is extensively quarried, and was the material of Chatsworth House and Belvoir Castle. Lead ore also occurs."

Following World War I, Hopton Wood Stone was used by the Imperial War Graves Commission to supply headstones, with over 120,000 being created and sent to war cemeteries in Britain, Belgium, and France. The limestone is said to have been laid in conjunction with a "native black stone" to create the first chequerboard floor in England.

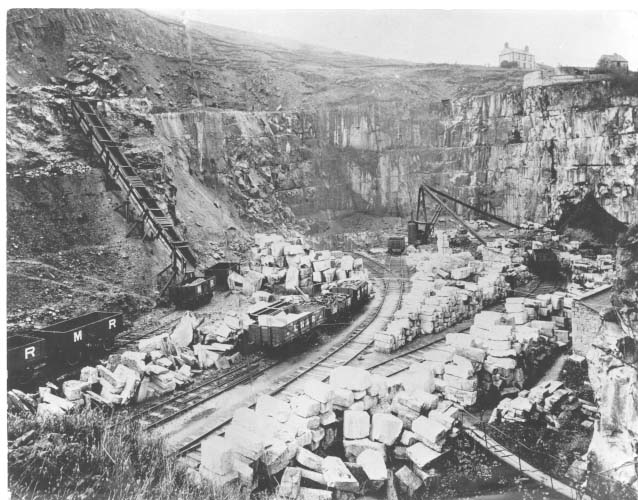
A view of the interior of the quarry in the 1920s, with the rail link shown. Blocks of Hopton Wood Stone await transportation.

It has also been used in decorative work, including the Houses of Parliament, the Bank of England, the Tower of London, Westminster Abbey, Big Ben, Chatsworth House, Hopton Hall, the University of Oxford, several cathedrals, and Oscar Wilde's tomb, among others.

In 1947 the Hopton-Wood Stone Firms Ltd commissioned a book about Hopton Wood stone, published by Fanfare press.

Long connected to Middleton Mine directly south on the Hopton Via Gellia, the sites were in operation from the 18th century onwards; the quarry system extracted "4–500,000 tons" of limestone a year until operations ended in 2006.

== Modern day ==
Since the closure of Middleton Mine and Hopton Quarry, the stone's reputation as a premier decorative mark has maintained. The nature of the stone means that most examples are still of high quality today. A reserve is kept at the National Stone Centre, for repair. Middleton Mine has been used as a filming location for several movies, including the Mission Impossible franchise, The Fantastic Four: First Steps, and The Lord of the Rings.
