= The Lightbox =

Museum in Surrey, England

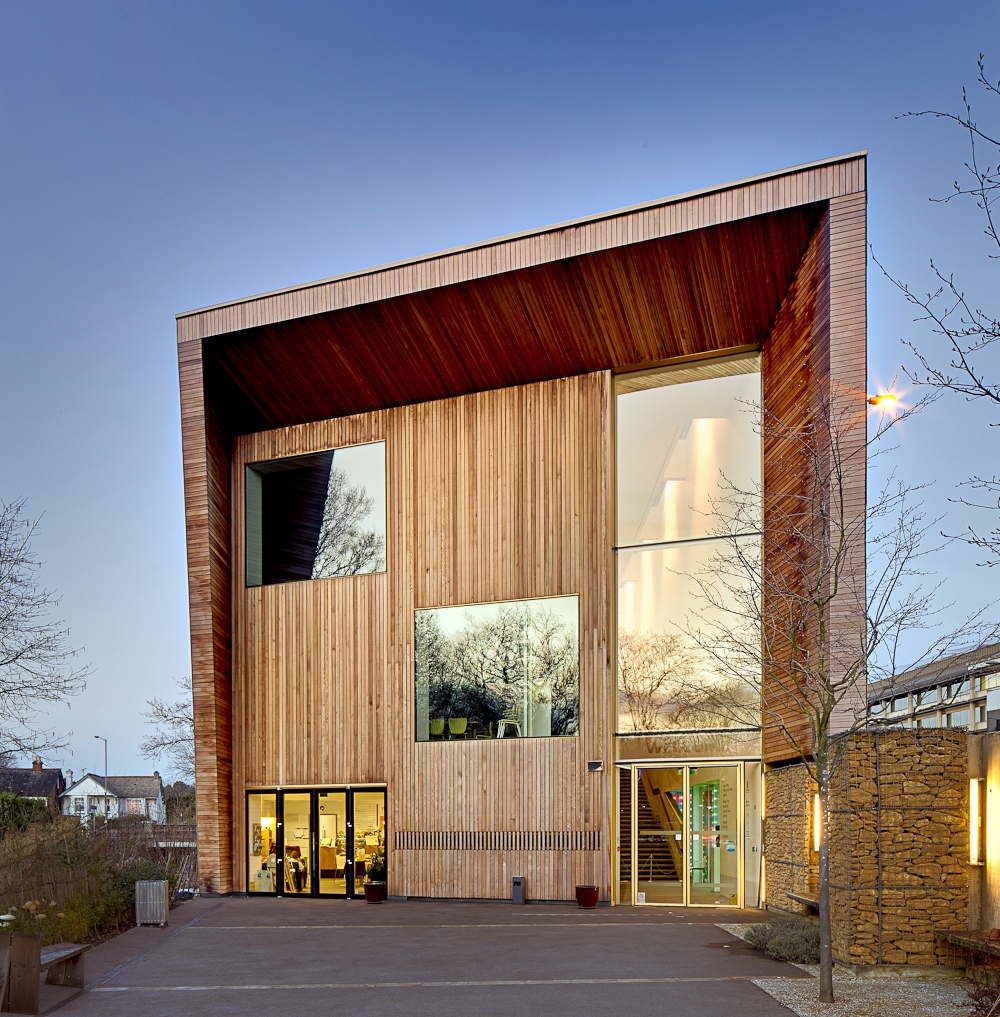

- Location within Surrey Location within England Location within the United Kingdom
- Established: 14 September 2007; 18 years ago
- Location: Woking, United Kingdom
- Coordinates: 51°19′17.7″N 0°33′32.3″W

The Lightbox is a public gallery and museum located in Woking, Surrey, in the South East of England. Three galleries host a range of exhibitions, changing regularly and it has a free museum of local history – 'Woking's Story'. It was opened on 14 September 2007.

== Overview ==
Located in the centre of Woking on the banks of the Basingstoke Canal, The Lightbox was built to provide arts and heritage services to the local region and beyond. The project began in 1993 when a group of local volunteers decided to try and establish a cultural centre in the Woking area. Following a fundraising campaign the contemporary building was designed by Marks Barfield Architects, the architects behind the London Eye.

In 2008 it won the Art Fund Prize Museum of the Year award, and in 2016 it was awarded a Green Tourism silver award. The Lightbox holds charitable status and is part-funded by Woking Borough Council (this is being heavily reduced in 2024 and withdrawn completely in 2025), and it has received support from the Heritage Lottery Fund and the Arts Council.

The Lightbox hosts around 20 temporary exhibitions per year, the majority of which are devised in-house.

== Admission ==
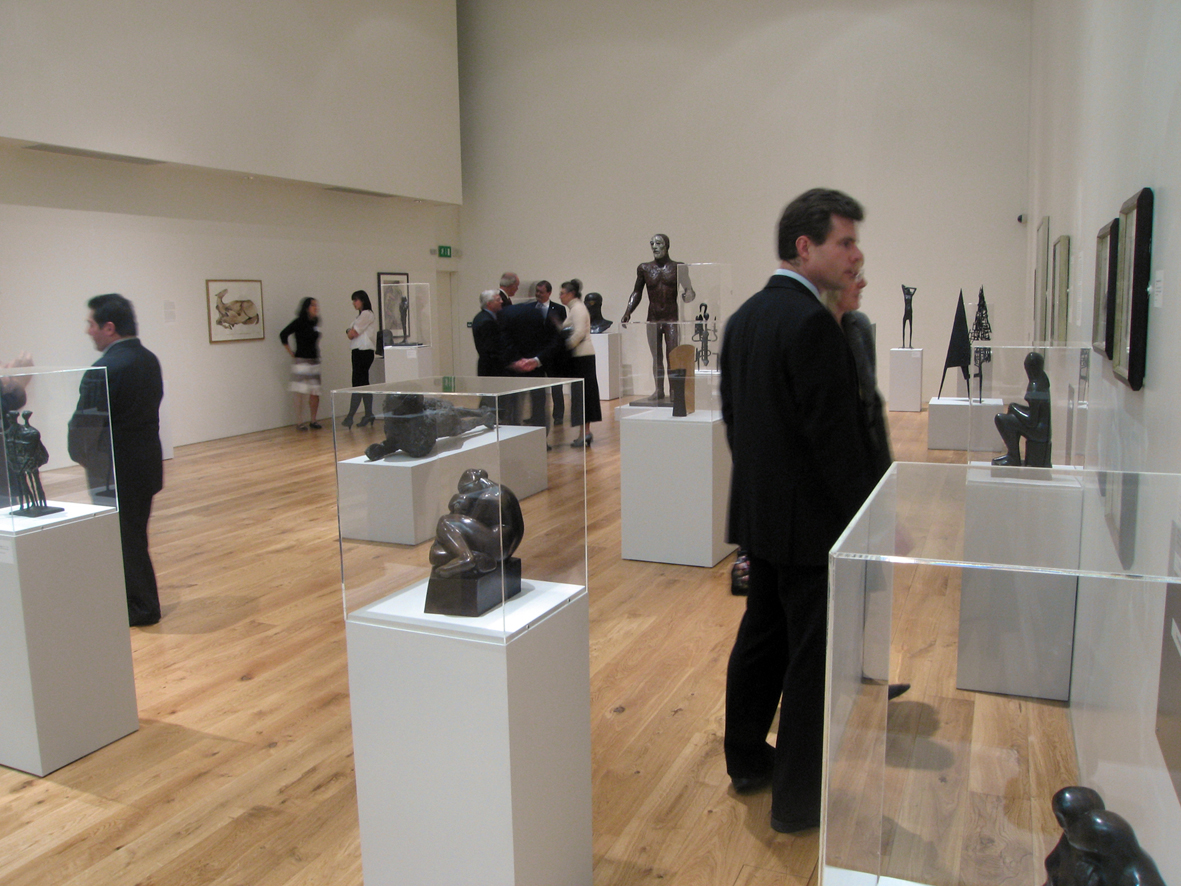
Main Gallery exhibition

General Admission Free: This includes the Café, the Shop, the Art Fund Prize Gallery and Woking's Story museum. Entrance to Main and Upper Gallery exhibitions only with a Day Pass which has increased (May 2024) from £9.50 to £12.50 (with the option of an additional £1 donation to The Lightbox charity programme). Lightbox Members and under 18s visit free.

Lightbox Membership comes in five tiers: Young Members (18-25) pay £10, Individual Members pay £30 per annum, Individual Plus Members pay £40 per annum, Joint Members pay £50 per annum and Joint Plus Members pay £60 per annum. Plus Members can bring a guest for free. There is a 20% discount if you pay by Direct Debit.

A Supporter membership is no longer offered.

With a minimum donation of £1500 (increased by £500 May 2024) you can join the Exhibition Circle Membership.

== Exhibitions ==
Past exhibitions at The Lightbox have included collections of work by Elisabeth Frink, Gertrude Jekyll, Auguste Renoir, Damien Hirst, Andy Warhol, John Constable, Henry Moore, Bridget Riley, David Remfry and Michael Ayrton.
