= L'Escargot =

L’Escargot may refer to:

- L'Escargot (restaurant), a London restaurant
- L'Escargot (horse), a race horse
- L'Escargot (TV series), a Hong Kong television drama
