= Metropolitan Commissioners of Sewers Act 1848 =

Act of the Parliament of the United Kingdom

- Act of Parliament
- Parliament of the United Kingdom
- Long title: An Act to consolidate, and continue in force for Two Years and to the End of the then next Session of Parliament, the Metropolitan Commissions of Sewers.
- Citation: 11 & 12 Vict. c. 112
- Territorial extent: United Kingdom

Dates
- Royal assent: 4 September 1848
- Commencement: 4 September 1848 (Note: Section 1.)
- Expired: 4 September 1850 (Note: Section 148.)
- Repealed: 11 August 1875

Other legislation
- Amends: See § Repealed enactments
- Repeals/revokes: See § Repealed enactments
- Amended by: Metropolitan Sewers Act 1849; Metropolitan Sewers Act 1851; Metropolitan Sewers Act 1852; Metropolitan Sewers Act 1853; Metropolitan Sewers Act 1854; Metropolitan Sewers Act 1855
- Repealed by: Statute Law Revision Act 1875

Status: Repealed

Text of statute as originally enacted

The Metropolitan Commissioners of Sewers Act 1848 (11 & 12 Vict. c. 112) was an act of the Parliament of the United Kingdom that consolidated, and continued in force, the several commissions of sewers for the metropolis of London.

== Provisions ==
=== Repealed enactments ===
Section 142 of the act repealed 10 enactments, listed in schedule F to the act. The repeal did not prejudice or affect any rates made, or any act, matter or thing whatsoever done or commenced, or any rights or liabilities acquired, created or arising under or reserved or saved by the repealed acts or any of them.

Citation	Short title	Description	Extent of repeal
Holborn and Finsbury
18 Geo. 3. c. 66	Halliwell and Finsbury Drainage Act 1778	An Act for making proper Drains and Sewers for the Purpose of carrying off the Water from the Prebendal Estate of Halliwell and Finsbury in the Suburbs of the City of London; and for other Purposes therein mentioned.	The whole act.
54 Geo. 3. c. ccxix	Halliwell and Finsbury and Holborn Drains and Sewers Act 1814	An Act to amend an Act made in the Eighteenth Year of His present Majesty, for making Drains and Sewers for carrying off the Water from the Prebendal Estate of Halliwell and Finsbury in the Suburbs of the City of London, and for other Purposes therein mentioned; and to extend some of the Provisions thereof to Part of the Holborn Division in the County of Middlesex.	The whole act.
Westminster and Part of Middlesex
47 Geo. 3. Sess. 1. c. vii	Westminster and Middlesex Sewers Act 1807	An Act to enlarge the Powers and extend the Jurisdiction of the Commissioners of Sewers for the City and Liberty of Westminster and Part of the County of Middlesex.	The whole act.
52 Geo. 3. c. xlviii	Westminster and Middlesex Commissioners of Sewers Act 1812	An Act for empowering the Commissioners of Sewers for the City and Liberty of Westminster and Part of the County of Middlesex to purchase a Messuage and Premises for holding their Meetings, and for enlarging the Powers of the said Commissioners.	The whole act.
7 & 8 Geo. 4. c. xxxiii	Westminster and Middlesex Sewers Act 1827	An Act to empower the Commissioners of Sewers for the City and Liberty of Westminster and Part of the County of Middlesex to purchase certain Premises situate at the Corner of Sun Court in Curzon Street in the Parish of Saint George Hanover Square in the said City and Liberty, and for other Purposes relating thereto.	The whole act.
10 & 11 Vict. c. lxx	Westminster and Middlesex Sewers Act 1847	An Act to explain and amend the Laws of Sewers relating to the City and Liberty of Westminster and Part of the County of Middlesex.	The whole act.
Surrey, East Mouldsey to Ravensborne
49 Geo. 3. c. clxxxiii	Surrey and Kent Sewers Act 1809	An Act for making new Sewers and Drains, and amending the present Sewers and Drains, within certain Districts under the Jurisdiction of the Commissioners of Sewers for the Limits extending from East Mouldsey in Surrey to Ravensborne in Kent, and for other Purposes relating to the Execution of the Commission of Sewers for the said Limits.	The whole act.
50 Geo. 3. c. cxliv	Surrey and Kent Sewers Act 1810	An Act for amending, enlarging, and extending the Powers of an Act passed in the last Session of Parliament relating to the Execution of the Commission of Sewers for the Limits from East Mouldsey in Surrey to Ravensborne in Kent.	The whole act.
53 Geo. 3. c. lxxix	Surrey and Kent Sewers Act 1813	An Act for amending, enlarging, and extending the Powers of Two several Acts passed in the Forty-ninth and Fiftieth Years of His present Majesty, relating to the Execution of the Commission of Sewers for the Limits extending from East Mouldsey in Surrey to Ravensborne in Kent.	The whole act.
10 & 11 Vict. c. ccxvii	Surrey and Kent Drainage (East Moulsey to Ravensbourne) Act 1847	An Act to facilitate the effectual Drainage of certain Districts within the Commission of Sewers for the Limits extending from East Mouldsey in Surrey to Ravensborne in Kent.	The whole act.

== Subsequent developments ==
The whole act was repealed by section 1 of, and the schedule to, the Statute Law Revision Act 1875 (38 & 39 Vict. c. 66), which came into force on 11 August 1875.
