= Roy Ackerman =

English restaurateur (1942–2017)

Roy Kenneth Ackerman
- Born: 22 February 1942
- Died: 16 May 2017 (aged 75)
- Occupations: restaurateur, owner of Gay Hussar and L'Etoile

Roy Kenneth Ackerman CBE (22 February 1942 – 16 May 2017) was an English restaurateur who owned the Gay Hussar and Etoile restaurants and published the Ackerman Guides and Egon Ronay restaurant guides.

== Career ==
Ackerman started his first career with apprenticeship training in the kitchen and then opened his restaurant, Quincy's Bistro in 1975.
