= Sean Kenny (theatre designer) =

Irish scenic designer, costume designer, lighting designer and director

- Born: 23 December 1932; Portroe, County Tipperary, Ireland
- Died: 11 June 1973; London, UK
- Occupations: Scenic, costume and lighting designer (theatre and film)
- Spouse(s): Jan Walker (m. 19??; div. 19??) Judy Huxtable (m. 1966; div. 1969)
- Partner: Judy Geeson (1969–1973)
- Children: 3
- Awards: 1963 Tony Award; Best Scenic Designer for the New York production of Oliver!

Sean Kenny (23 December 1932 – 11 June 1973) was an Irish theatre and film scenic designer, costume designer, lighting designer and director.

Kenny was the set designer for the musicals of Lionel Bart including Oliver!, Lock Up Your Daughters and Blitz!.

== Life ==
Kenny was born in Portroe, County Tipperary, Ireland in 1932. (Note: Some sources, including the Dictionary of Irish Biography and Victoria and Albert Museum, suggest that Kenny was born in 1932. Other sources, including the Internet Broadway Database, give a date of birth in 1929. Kenny's New York Times obituary states that he was 43 at the time of his death (implying a date of birth in 1929 or 1930).) While he was an architecture student, Kenny and three others sailed from Ireland to New York in a 36-foot sailboat, the Ituna, in 1950.

Kenny was a contributor to The Establishment, a standup satire and jazz club in London founded by Peter Cook and Nicholas Luard. In the 1960s, after the workday, Kenny and his staff often made the short trip of a few steps across Manette Street from his design studio into the back door of The Pillars of Hercules.

In 1966, Kenny married model Judy Huxtable. She later described him as "regularly unfaithful", and left him to marry Peter Cook.

Following his divorce, Kenny lived with the actress Judy Geeson until his sudden death from a heart attack and brain haemorrhage in 1973, at age 40.

In Stoned by Andrew Loog Oldham, Oldham pays tribute to Kenny as one of the brilliant and original minds working in London theatre in the 1960s, particularly for his work on Lionel Bart's musicals Oliver! and Lock Up Your Daughters. Also in Stoned, Kenny's partner Judy Geeson states that he "had an unusual combination of abilities: he had the creativity to dream up a design. But he also had a brilliant engineer's brain so he didn't only dream it, he knew how to make it".

== Design style ==
Kenny collaborated with the author and director to make the scenery contribute so significantly to the production that the scenery became a character in the play. Theatre impresario Cameron Mackintosh wrote about Kenny's designs for Oliver!: "A lot of the original 1960 production had been written during rehearsal to accompany the working of Sean Kenny's set, as Oliver! has an episodic story that requires quick and varied changes of locale."

Peter Roberts wrote in Plays and Players about Kenny's design for the inaugural production of Hamlet for the National Theatre at The Old Vic theatre in 1963: "The scenic shorthand of Sean Kenny's revolving set has all the vigour and unfussy force of O'Toole's performance in the title role...From a practical point of view it enables the director to deploy his cast three-dimensionally, in height as well as across the stage and enables scene changes to be effected rapidly and practically." December 1963.

For each production, Kenny invented what he called a "frame", as in framework or scaffold or skeleton. For productions with small budgets, the frame would be stationary and for productions with large budgets the frame would be dynamic, moving. In Oliver! the frame consisted of multi-level scaffolding built on a rotating turntable and two rotating side wagons, properly called ring fragments, that followed the curve of the turntable. In Pickwick, the frame was four multi-level scaffolds on wagons that could move in any direction, like four rolling houses. For Blitz! the frame was four multi-level scaffolds on rolling wagons and two towers that rolled up and down stage, connected by a bridge that raised and lowered while the towers were moving. In each production this frame provided the different spaces, entrances, levels and playing areas needed by the script and by the action.

Writing for a review of Oliver! in the New York Post, Clive Barnes stated that Kenny's "influence on British stage design is incalculable. His imagination in the high tech use of modern theatrical technology, paved the way for all the British musical extravaganza which followed".

== Projects ==
Incomplete list:

- 1957 The Shadow of a Gunman (revival)
- 1958 The Hostage (première Joan Littlewood's Theatre Workshop at Theatre Royal Stratford East)
- 1959 Cock-a-Doodle Dandy (Royal Court Theatre)
- 1959 Mermaid Theatre (Art Director)
- 1959 Lock Up Your Daughters (Mermaid Theatre)
- 1960 The Lily-White Boys
- 1960 Oliver! (scenic design, costume design)
- 1960 Riders to the Sea (BBC film)
- 1960 Chin-Chin (Wyndham's Theatre, London)
- 1961 Romeo and Juliet (Royal Shakespeare Company, Royal Shakespeare Theatre – Stratford-upon-Avon, Sir Peter Hall (director))
- 1961 The Devils (première, Royal Shakespeare Company, Aldwych Theatre, London)
- 1961 Altona (Jean-Paul Sartre) (Royal Court Theatre)
- 1961 The Miracle Worker (London)
- 1962 Stop the World – I Want to Get Off (Broadway)
- 1962 I Thank a Fool
- 1962 King Priam (scenic and costume design, Covent Garden Opera Company, Royal Opera, London)
- 1962 Blitz!
- 1962 Uncle Vanya (Chichester Festival Theatre with Michael Redgrave and Laurence Olivier)
- 1962 I Thank a Fool (film)
- 1963 The Beggar's Opera (Royal Shakespeare Company, Aldwych Theatre, London)
- 1963 Pickwick
- 1963 Uncle Vanya (film with Michael Redgrave and Laurence Olivier)
- 1963 The Old Vic renovations for the Royal National Theatre
- 1963 Hamlet (at the Old Vic for the Royal National Theatre)
- 1965 Maggie May
- 1965 The Roar of the Greasepaint – The Smell of the Crowd
- 1965–1966 Casino de Paris, (Dunes, Las Vegas, Nevada)
- 1966 Stop the World – I Want to Get Off (film)
- 1966 Der fliegende Holländer (scenic and costume design, Covent Garden Opera Company, Royal Opera, London)
- 1967 Historical Section of the British Pavilion, Expo 67, Montreal, Canada
- 1967 The Gyrotron (1967–1981 La Ronde, Expo 67, Montreal, Canada)
- 1967 The Four Musketeers, (Theatre Royal, Drury Lane)
- 1968 Gulliver's Travels (Mermaid Theatre, author, producer, scenic design, director)
- 1969 Les Noces (Royal Swedish Ballet for Jerome Robbins)
- 1969 Gardner Arts Centre archive at the University of Sussex
- 1970 Peer Gynt (Chichester Festival Theatre)
- 1970 Here are Ladies (Siobhán McKenna's one-woman show)
- 1972 Clownaround (scenic, costume and lighting design for Gene Kelly)
- 1973 The King of Friday's Men (Abbey Theatre, Dublin)
- 1973 Juno and the Paycock (Mermaid Theatre) (scenic design, director)
- 1973 New London Theatre inspired by the Total Theater designed by architect Walter Gropius for director Erwin Piscator

== Awards ==
- American Theatre Wing Tony Award
- The American Theatre Wing's Tony Awards 1963 Winner, Best Scenic Designer, Oliver!
- The American Theatre Wing's Tony Awards 1965 Nomination, Best Scenic Designer, The Roar of the Greasepaint – The Smell of the Crowd
