= Gleadow =

Gleadow may refer to:

- Rupert Gleadow (22 January 1909 - 1974) was a British lawyer and author, who wrote on legal matters under the name of Justin Case
- Marcus Gleadow-Ware is the executive chef at Aureole, a Michelin starred restaurant in New York City
