= House of St Barnabas =

Grade I Listed building in London, England

Coordinates: 51.5149°N 0.1313°W

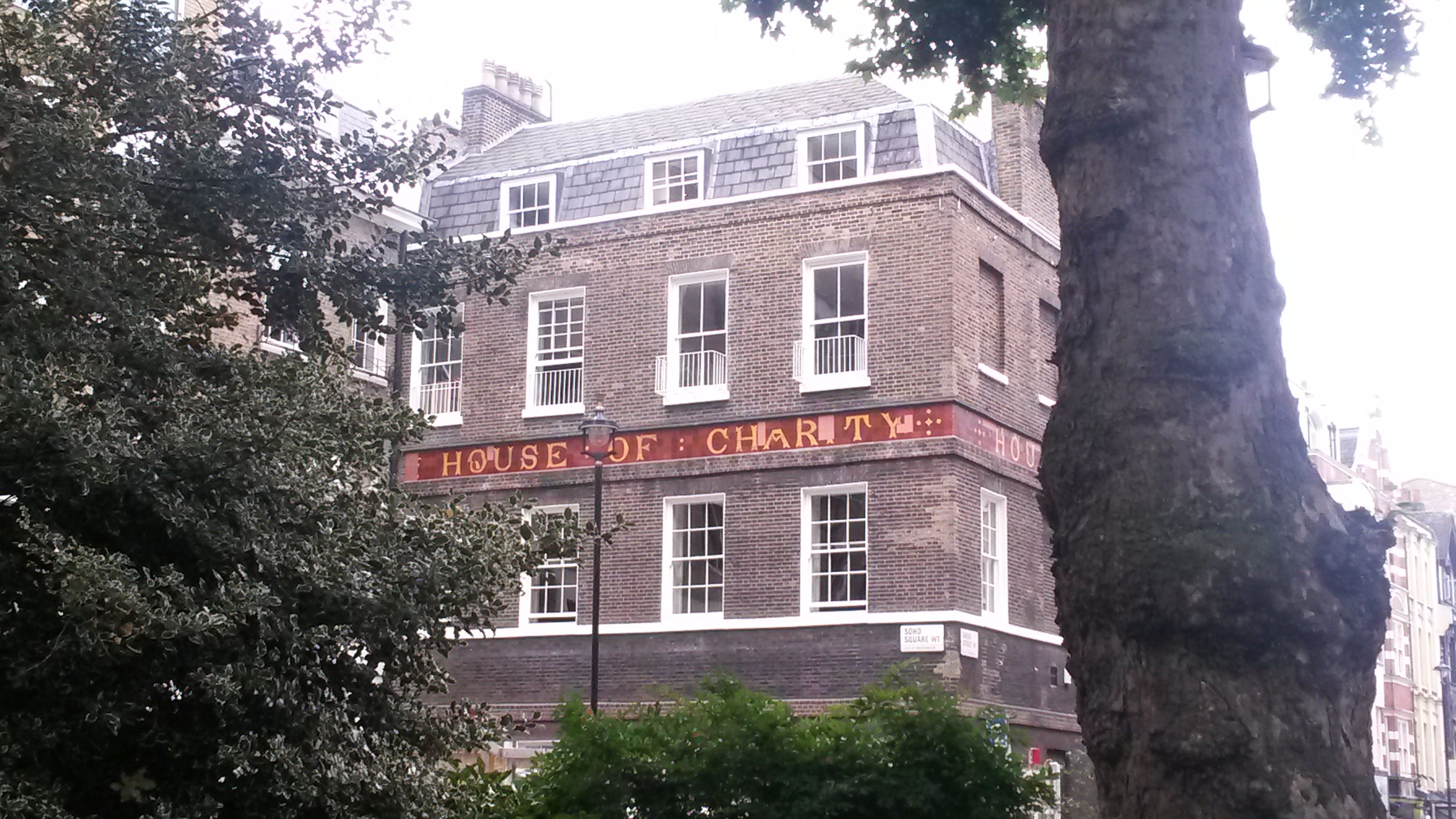
The House of St Barnabas from Soho Square

The House of St Barnabas, at 1 Greek Street, Soho, is a Grade I Listed Georgian building in London notable for its rococo plasterwork interiors and for other architectural features.

Since 1862 the House has been run as a charity to help those who have experienced homelessness. The name of the organisation was changed from the "House of Charity" to the "House of St Barnabas" in 1951. The building functioned as a hostel for women until 2006.

The not-for-profit members' club at The House of St Barnabas opened in October 2013 and closed in January 2024. In February 2026, The Explorers Club of New York announced a London clubhouse at The House of St Barnabas.

== History ==
In March 1679, Richard Frith and William Pym were developing Soho Square, then known as Fryths Square. A timber merchant, Cadogon Thomas of Lambeth, held a lease for a great corner house, coach house and stables. Aristocrats who lived in the Restoration house included the second Baron Crew, Lady Elizabeth Cavendish and the dowager Countess of Fingall but the longest residence was of William Archer MP from 1719 until 1738. By May 1742 the original house had been demolished; the new house was built between 1744 and 1747, but it remained unoccupied until the lease was sold to Richard Beckford (a member of a wealthy family of Jamaican plantation owners and brother to Alderman William Beckford) in October 1754.

It is likely that the elaborate rococo plasterwork was added by Richard Beckford. Upon his death in 1756, the house was sold to Sir James Colebrooke with a conveyance stating that the previous owner had made some 'useful and ornamental furnishings'.

In 1811 the house ceased to be a residential property and was let to the Westminster Commissioners of Sewers, and its successor the Metropolitan Commission of Sewers after 1849. In 1856 the house was used by the Metropolitan Board of Works, and became the office of Sir Joseph William Bazalgette. It was during this time that the 19th century additions were made at the back of the house.

Research published in The Dickensian in 1963 suggests that the rooms and gardens of the House of St Barnabas were the blueprint for the imagined lodgings of Dr. Manette and Lucy in the novel A Tale of Two Cities by Charles Dickens, published in 1859 and set between the turmoil of Paris during the French Revolution and the comparative tranquillity of London. Subsequently, the road on which is the Chapel entrance was renamed Manette Street.

In a building at the back, attainable by a courtyard where a plane tree rustled its green leaves, church organs claimed to be made, and likewise gold to be beaten by some mysterious giant who had a golden arm starting out of the wall... as if he had beaten himself precious.

— A Tale of Two Cities, Charles Dickens

The 'golden arm' now resides at the Dickens House Museum but you can see a modern replica sticking out of the wall near the Pillars of Hercules pub at the western end of Manette Street (formerly Rose Street).

=== Charitable work ===
The House of Charity, founded in 1846, moved from its home No. 9 Rose (now Manette) Street to the new premises at 1 Greek Street in 1861, which had been purchased for £6,400.

Behind the House of Charity was an ideal of practical Christianity, spurred on by the Oxford Movement. The first list of members included William Ewart Gladstone.

One of the original functions of the Charity was to keep families together when the husband of a family went into a workhouse. Between January 1847 and February 1851, 487 people were admitted. Of these, 103 were families ranging from a single mother to a family of ten with both parents and eight children. These families were a typical example of the way in which the House of Charity set out "to offer to those who are sunk in the depths of temporal, and frequently spiritual, wretchedness, the example of the discipline of a Christian family".

The House of Charity described itself as one of the few institutions in London where men, women and children of all walks of life, were able to 'apply for aid without a loss of self-respect'. Temporary guests of the house included 'all who found themselves in a condition of friendlessness and destitution that is not the manifest result of idleness or vice.'

=== World War II and beyond ===
Between 1862 and the outbreak of World War II, the Charity broadened its functions and over the years helped the homeless of London in many different ways: it helped people who were emigrating to Australia and were awaiting the long sea journey, people who had to come to London for surgery in hospitals, servants who had lost their jobs, teachers between positions and émigrés from Russia and the Balkans – an association which still continues to this day with the monthly services of the Macedonian community in the chapel.

After the outbreak of World War II, during the blitz, the nuns moved back to Clewer and the house was requisitioned for war duty. In November 1940 a bomb fell on the house, causing sufficient damage though fortunately no fatalities. The Air Training Corps used the premises as a headquarters during the war, having first applied to repair the bomb damage sufficiently to allow use of the building. Following this, London County Council was granted use of the building for 'the purpose of training Students in Child Welfare'.

After the war the house opened as a women's hostel, originally helping ex-service women, and at one time providing 'as many as 802 beds'. The hostel had many supporters and friends, among them Joyce Grenfell, the comic actress, who was a constant visitor and fundraiser. The house closed as a women's hostel in 2006. All the residents were re-housed.

The individual stories of the people who made the house their home over this long period are recorded in the house archives, which are now kept in the Westminster Archive. Then, as now, the charity was overseen by a board of trustees.

=== Now ===
The House of St Barnabas has the vision "to create a future where sustained employment is a reality for those affected by homelessness." It has been constituted as a members' club since 2013. The club hosts music and entertainment events, and also showcases visual art from established and emerging artists. The founding members of the club were Andrew Weatherall, Gilles Peterson, Sav Remzi, Miranda Sawyer, Ekow Eshun, Brian Cox, Margot Bowon, Richard Strange, Rob Da Bank, Rankin, Hew Locke and Jarvis Cocker.

In July 2019 it was reported that the house was running a 12-week scheme in which participants work in the club, in hospitality and administrative roles, alongside attending workshops, before graduating with a City and Guilds qualification. Graduates are provided with a minimum of one year post-programme support to help them back into lasting paid work and to help break the cycle of homelessness.

After a ceiling collapse in July 2023, the club announced its permanent closure in January 2024.

== The House ==
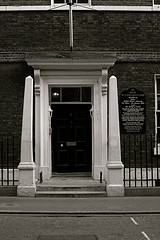
The front door

=== The Entrance Hall ===
The interior detail, the moulded plasterwork, is one of the finest examples of the English Rococo style surviving in London. Whilst it is not known for sure who instigated this work, it is probable that Richard Beckford commissioned the additions to the House's interior. Similarly, the designers of the elaborate plasterwork are thought to be George Fawkes and Humphrey Willmott, the plasterers employed at Mansion House at around the same date, though there is no solid evidence to support this.

The front door is original and the Charity still has the large key for the lock; 18th century London was a dangerous place, hence the enormous safety chain.

The simple decoration of the hall was a deliberate device to attract the visitor's eye to the decorated staircase leading to the rooms on the first floor.

The wrought-iron balustrades of the staircase are original. The original chandelier held candles and the mechanism for raising and lowering still exists. The Angel on the landing is the oldest object in the house. It dates from the 1600s, is made of wood and is Flemish. This has been embellished by the artist Nancy Fouts.

There is a galleried landing from which the plasterwork can be viewed more closely: there is a deep relief of female busts, a lion's head and scrollwork. In Richard Beckford's time, the panels would almost certainly have held oil paintings, probably of members of his large family. Their places are now occupied by paintings by the artist Alan Rankle.

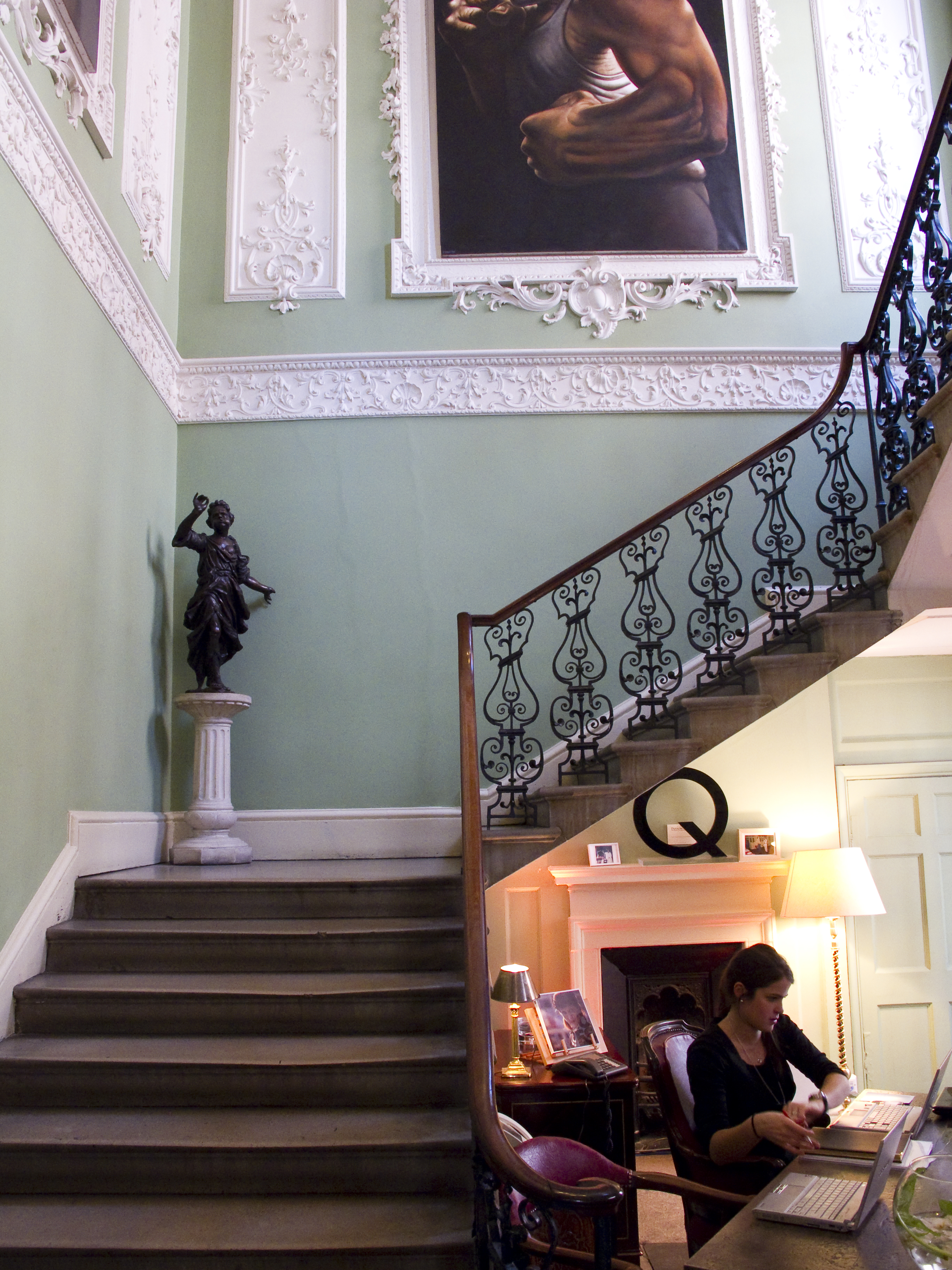
Entrance hall and staircase

=== The Soho & Dickens Rooms ===
The office for the Charity's Hostel Director and Personal Support Workers, who provided the one-to-one counselling, advice and support to the residents, was almost certainly the dining room, known as The Soho Room. This room, together with the Dickens room that leads from it, has plasterwork from the 1750s, although it is not quite as ornate as the decoration in the rooms above.

The Dickens Room has a fireplace with four roundel paintings of nuns, installed when the House of Charity moved into the buildings.

These rooms now hold the members' restaurant and private dining facilities.

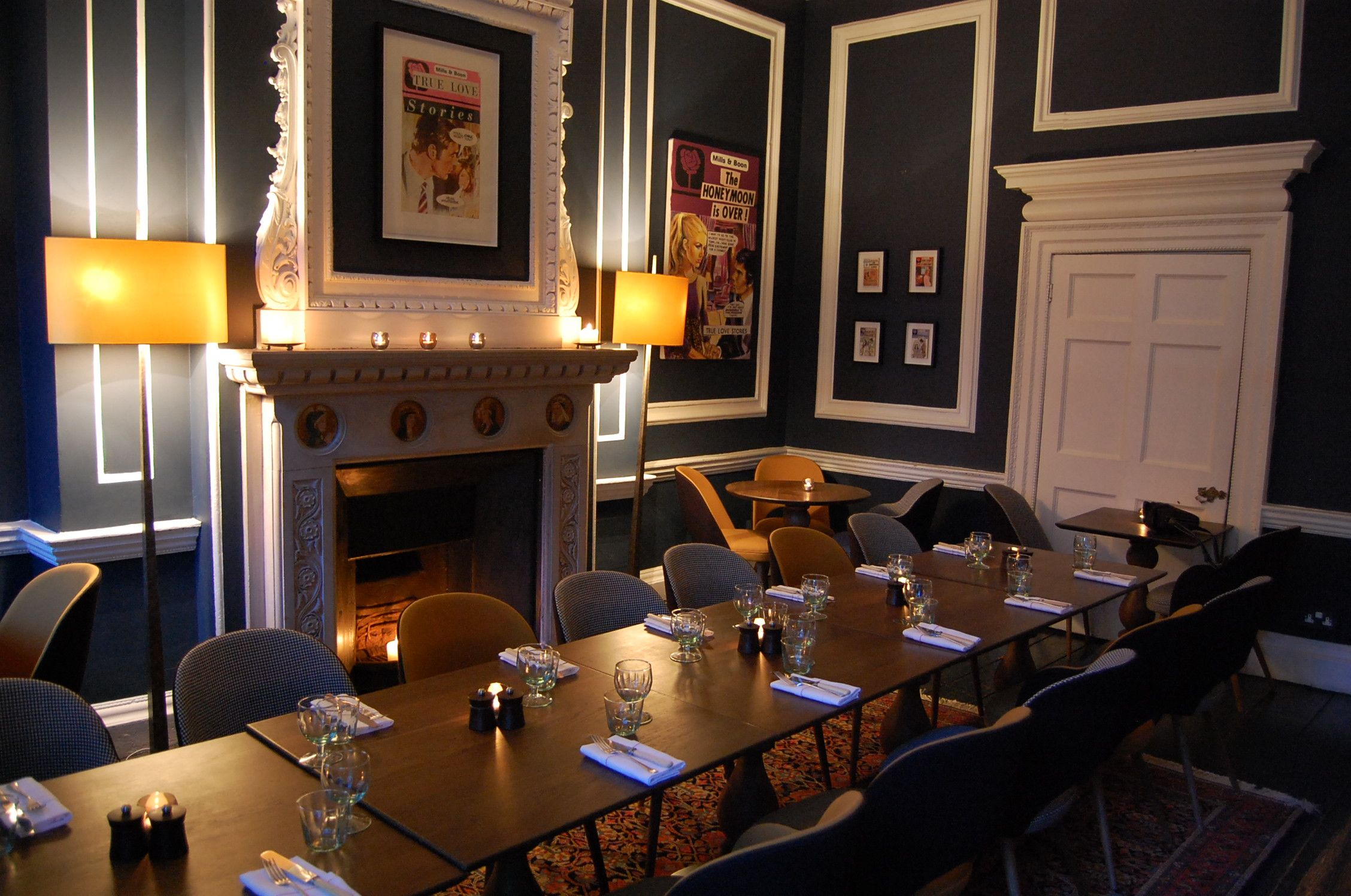
The Dickens Room

=== The Drawing Room ===
The ceiling of The Drawing Room has in its corners heads representing the Four Seasons. The central oval medallion shows four putti, holding in their hands the symbols of the four classical elements: earth, water, fire and air.

At the top of the wall panel in the drawing room opposite the chimneypiece are two dragons made of papier-mâché. These are the dragons of the city of London which, as an alderman, William Beckford was permitted to use. It is believed, although there is no concrete evidence, that the plasterers William used for Mansion House were engaged to plaster this, his brother Richard's house, as there are distinct similarities between the plasterwork, including the presence of the city of London dragons.

When the House of Charity acquired the property three of the marble chimneypieces from the House, including the Council Room chimneypiece, were sold to fund the building of the chapel. The overmantel and chimney piece were designed as part of the restoration in 1960 by Lawrence King.

The Drawing Room is the largest member's lounge in the club.

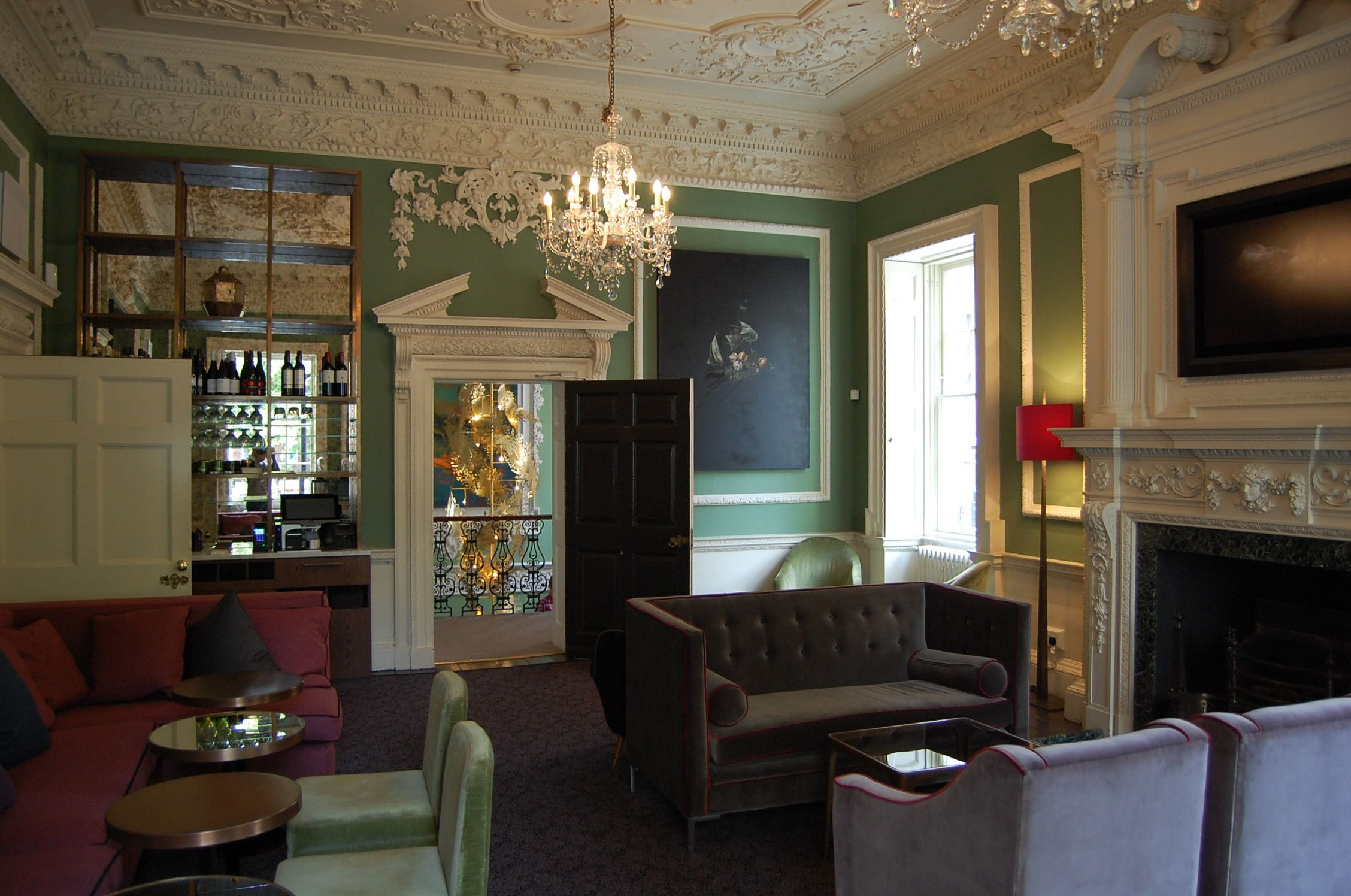
The Drawing Room

=== The Silk Room ===
The Silk Room is a silk-lined room which also has its original plasterwork ceiling and carved wooden chimneypiece. It is also called the Withdrawing Room, because in Georgian times it was the room that ladies would have withdrawn to.

The Silk Room is currently used as both a board room and private dining space.

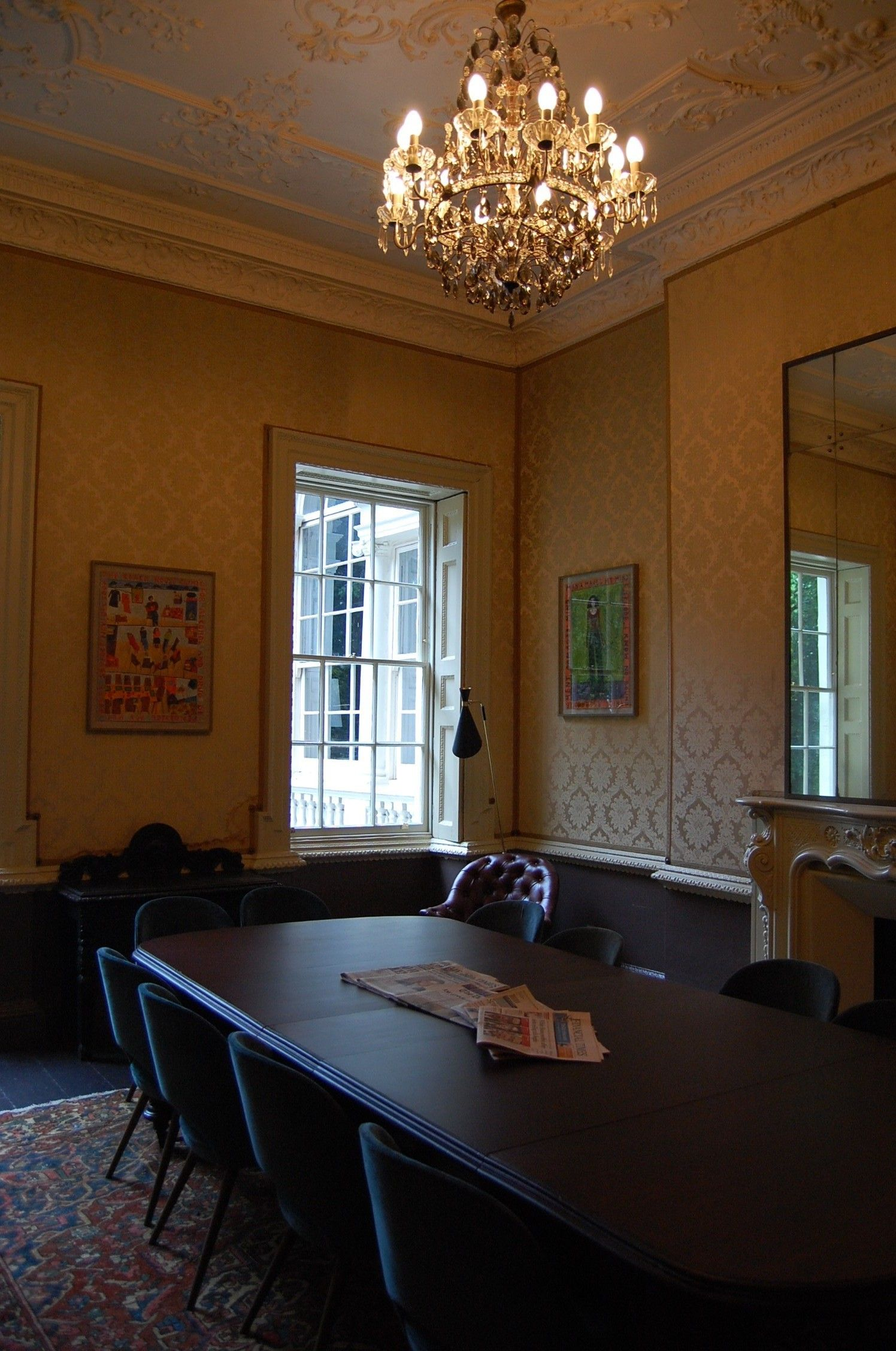
The Silk or Withdrawing Room

=== The Bazalgette Room ===
At the rear of the House, The Bazalgette Room was the principal bedroom. The chimneypiece and overmantel are original and the entrance door is matched by a false door at the southern end of the same wall. This was to give the room symmetry, but the plain plasterwork indicates that the room has been reduced in size to provide storage space for the Metropolitan Board of Works. The room takes its name from being the offices of the civil engineer Sir Joseph Bazalgette, who designed London's sewage system. The House of Charity used the Bazalgette room to house its archives, including all the records of those helped.

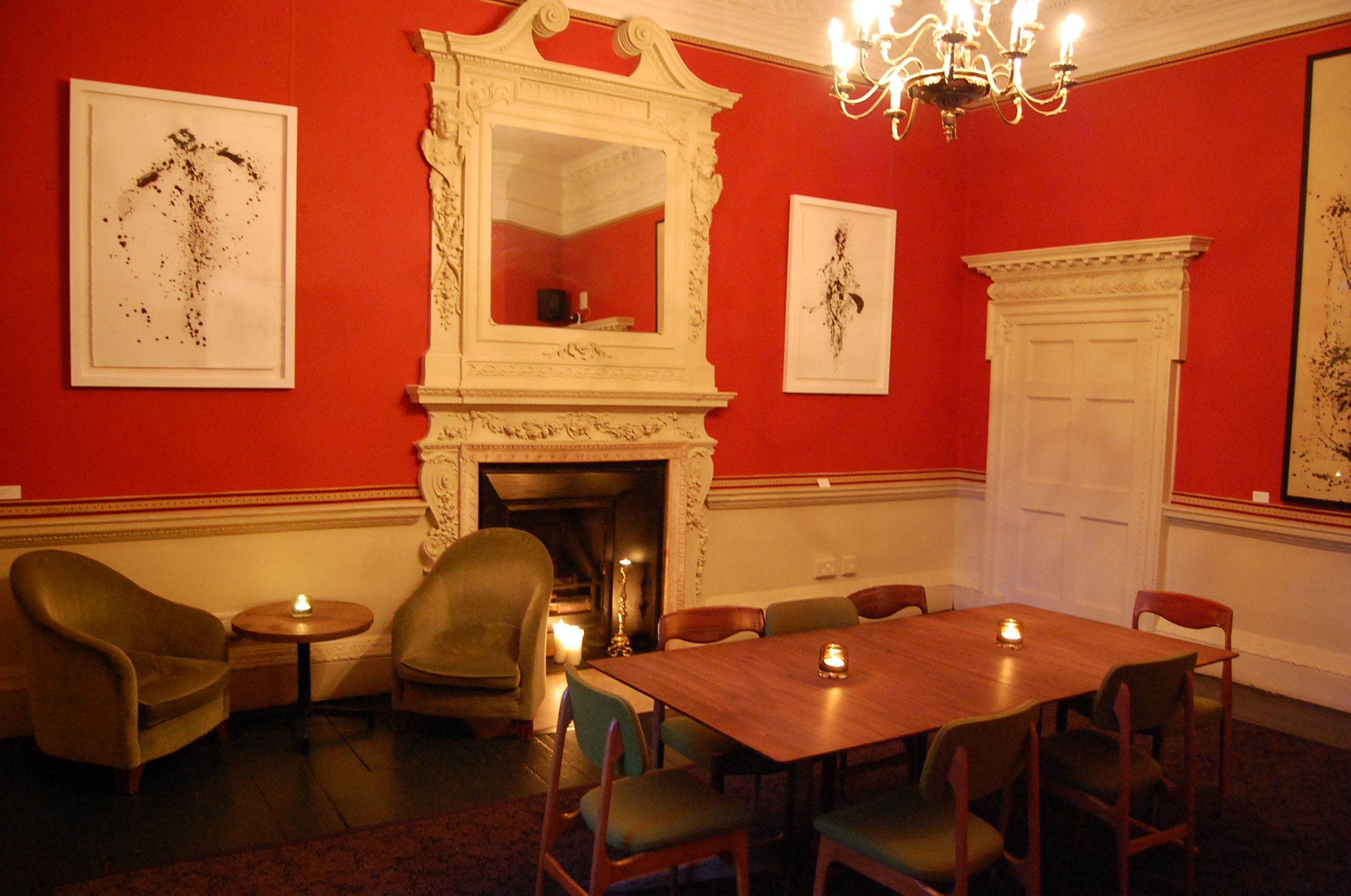
The Bazalgette Room

=== The Library Bar ===
The Library has a Victorian fireplace with the badges of the House of Charity, inscribed with the Charity's founding date, 1846, and 1862, the date the Charity moved into the House. Between the two badges is a text from the Gospel of Matthew "I was a stranger and ye took me in".

This is currently the club bar and central hub.

=== The Monro & Garden Rooms ===
The Monro Room and the Garden Room were created by the Charity out of an extension devised by the Metropolitan Board of works on part of the site of the stables that complimented the Georgian House.

A tavern clock about four feet high and made entirely of black lacquered wood with gold painted numbers hangs in the chapel corridor. The dial of these types of clocks was big and bold enabling them to be seen in dimly lit, smoke filled taverns. These clocks were also known as Act of Parliament clocks because they became popular after the British Parliament passed an Act in 1797 levying a tax on domestic clocks with the result that people relied on public clocks for their time-keeping.

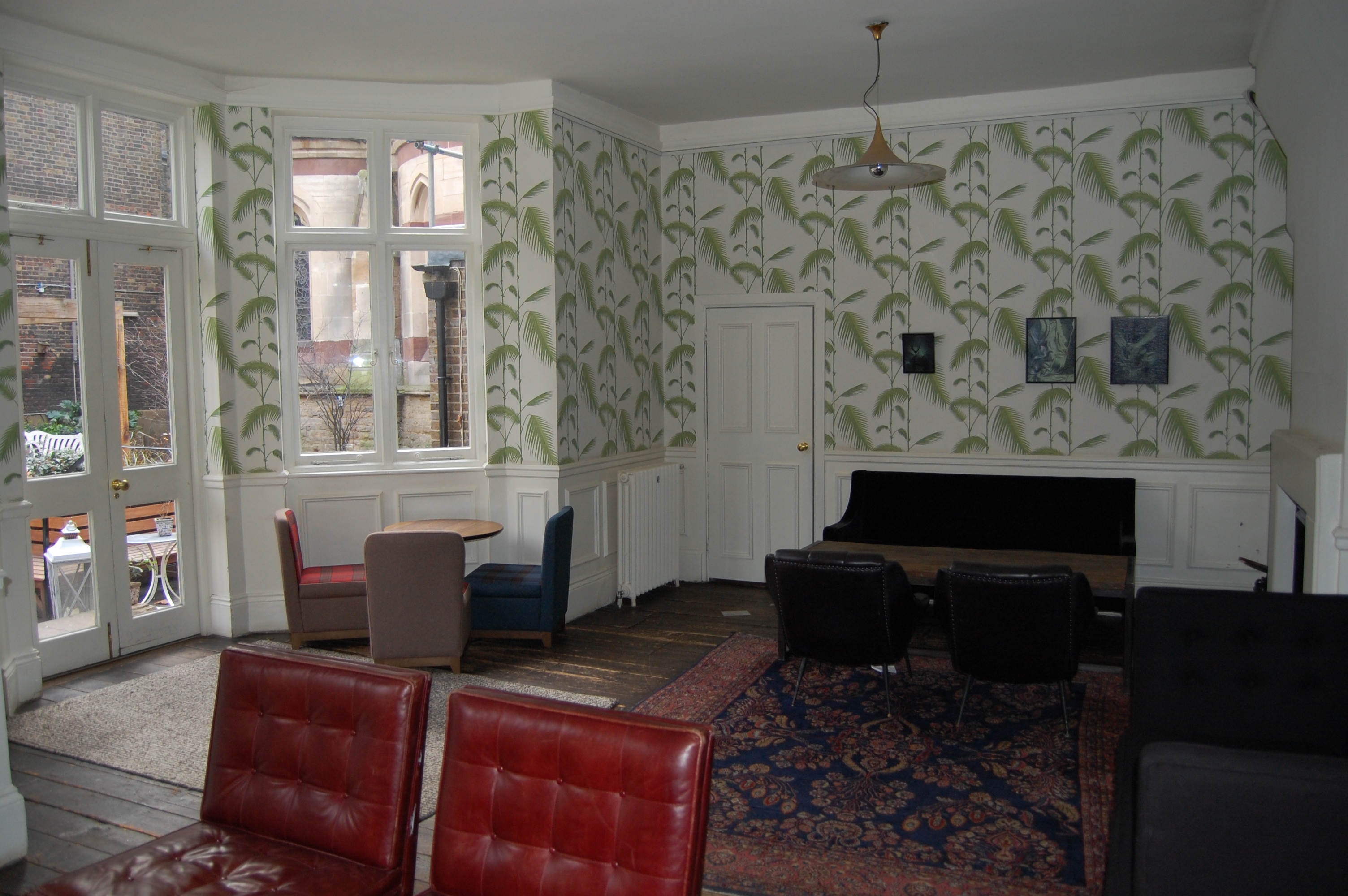
The Garden Room

=== The Crinoline Stair ===
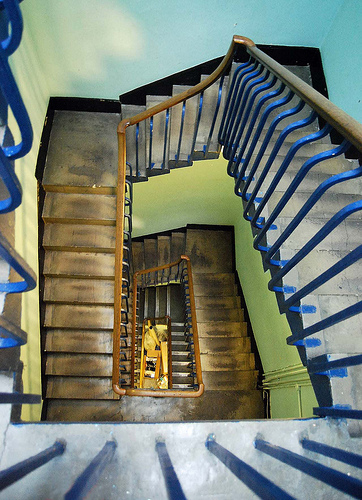
The Crinoline Stairs

=== The Penny Chute ===
On the outside of the house is the Penny Chute attached to the railings in Soho Square. Coins fall down the pipe to the alms box in the kitchen. People today still donate to the Charity using this method.

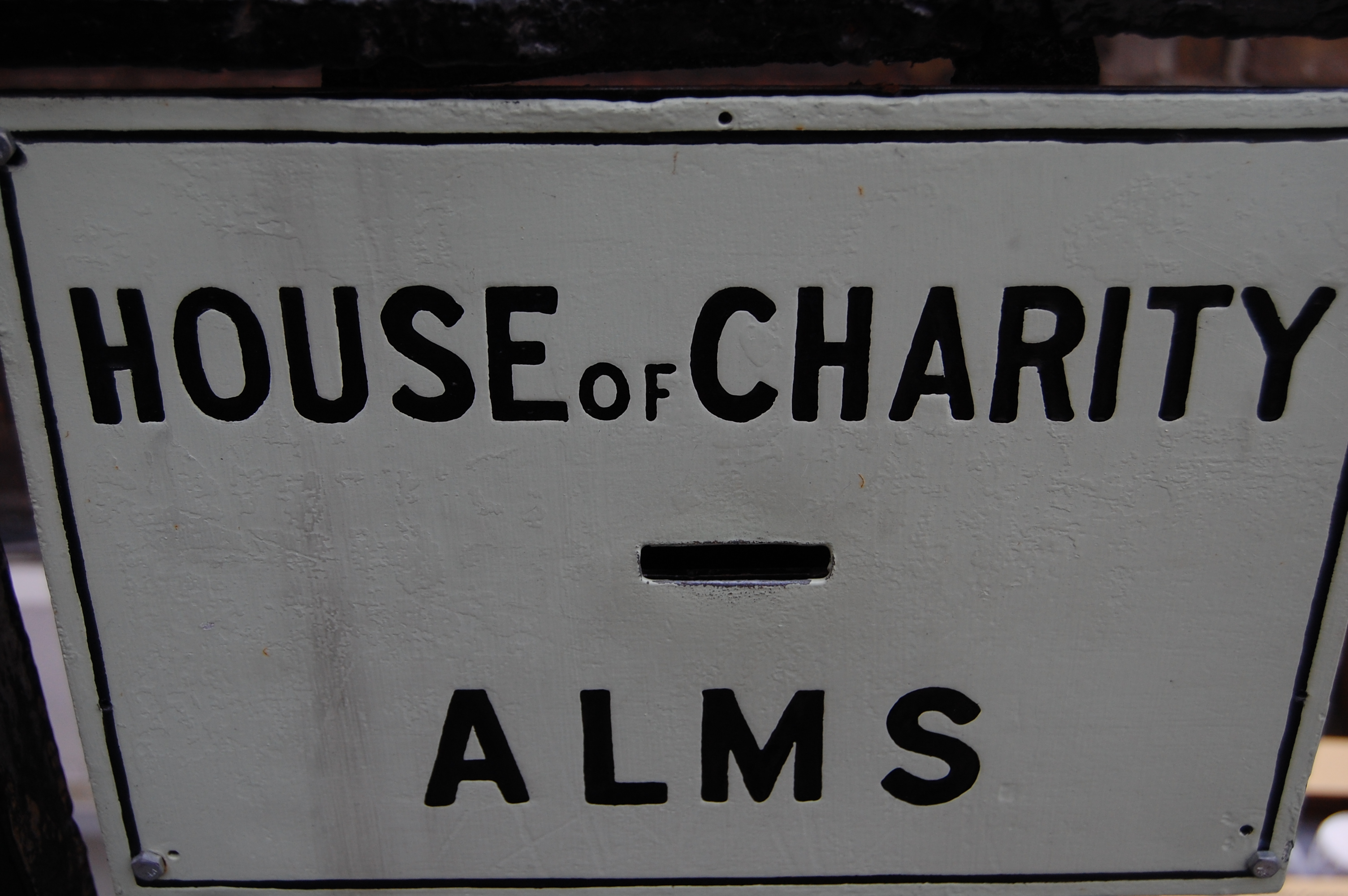
Penny Chute

== The Chapel ==
The chapel was built on the site of the Georgian stable yard between 1862 and 1864 by Edward Conder of Baltic Wharf, Kingsland Road. The architect was Joseph Clarke and the original plans for the site included a refectory with dormitories above and a cloister. The Annual Report of 1928 mentions that the plan of the Chapel "was suggested and partly designed from the plans of a Romanesque chapel attached to the Abbey of Montmajeur, Arles, France."

The cost of building the chapel proved a financial strain to the Charity, and 'in 1864 three chimney pieces were sold from the House.'

The chapel is a reminder of the Anglo-Catholic revival in the Church of England spearheaded by men like Newman, Pusey and Keble who published the Tracts for the Times between 1833 and 1841, earning them the name Tractarians. Their followers not only emphasised Catholic aspects of the Church of England but also a return to medieval Gothic architecture after neo-classical churches of the previous two hundred years. In 1848, the then Bishop of London, Archibald Tait, became Visitor to the charity and his successors continue to hold this office. The original plan included a throne for the Bishop behind the altar but, in 1865, Joseph Clarke proposed the mosaics by Harland and Fisher. The advice and support of the Visitor provide a living link between the House of St Barnabas and the Church of England in the Diocese of London.

During the Second World War, the original stained glass windows and roof of the Chapel suffered bomb damage. The apse above the altar was originally painted with the Passion of Christ and the windows commemorated the Charity's founders and supporters. The present windows behind the altar represent, from left to right, St Edward the Confessor; St Barnabas holding the Chapel in his arms; St Paul preaching and St John the Baptist holding the mother Chapel of Clewer in his arms; they were designed by John Hayward. The windows in the side apses, dating from 1958, represent the Stations of the Cross and the Annunciation. The organ was built by the firm of J. W. Walker & Sons Ltd in 1875 at a cost of £250 and was enlarged by them in 1884. At the west end of the South West apse is a memorial to Captain Henry Norman who died in 1925. He became a porter of the House after retiring as first mate of the Cutty Sark, the tea clipper now at Greenwich.

The Chapel remains a sacred space for prayer and worship. Although it is an Anglican Chapel, currently there are Eastern Orthodox services for London's Macedonian Orthodox community and baptisms and services following civil weddings.

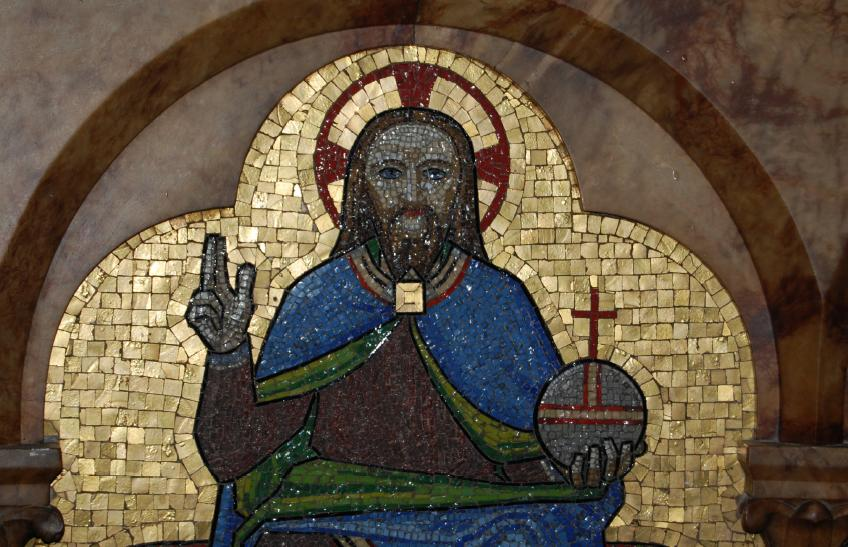

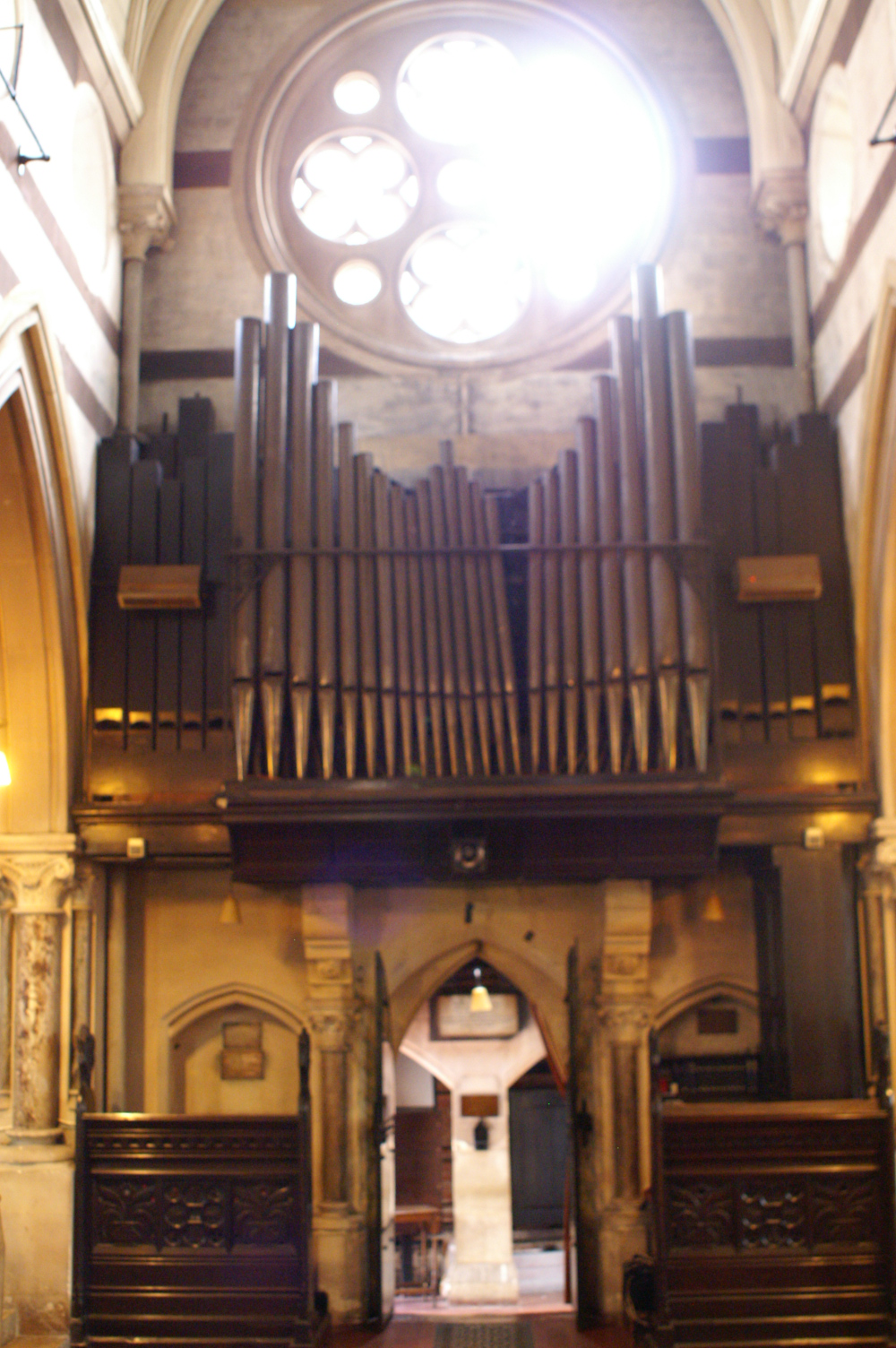
