= Greek Street =

Street in Soho, London

- Location within Greater London
- Former name: Hogs Lane
- Length: 0.2 mi (0.32 km)
- Location: Soho, London
- Postal code: W1
- Nearest Tube station: Leicester Square
- Coordinates: 51.5139°N 0.1308°W
- north end: Soho Square
- south end: A401

Greek Street is a street in Soho, London, leading south from Soho Square to Shaftesbury Avenue. The street is famous for its restaurants and cosmopolitan nature.

== History ==
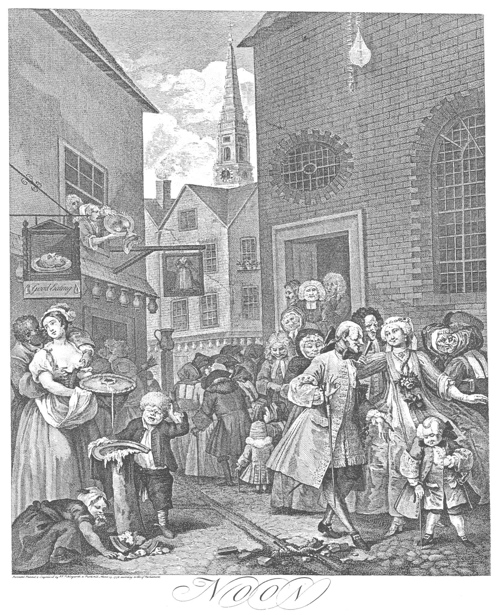
Hogarth's 'Noon' from Four Times of the Day, showing the church in the background

It is thought to take its name from a Greek church that was built in 1677 in adjacent Crown Street, now part of the west side of Charing Cross Road. The church is depicted in William Hogarth's 'Noon' from Four Times of the Day.

Although the street has several houses from the 18th century and earlier, it is mainly 19th-century in appearance.

No. 1 Greek Street is the House of St Barnabas, built in 1746. It became the offices of the Westminster Commissioner for Works for Sewers in 1811. This is where Chief Engineer Sir Joseph Bazalgette started to work on the construction of the London sewerage system. By 1862 the house had been taken over by The House of Charity, which was established in 1846 to provide temporary accommodation for homeless people. Charles Dickens used the house and gardens as a model for the London lodgings of Dr Manette and Lucy in A Tale of Two Cities.

There has been a public house known as Pillars of Hercules at no. 7 since 1733. The current pub building sports some artwork by Invader and was long favoured by many figures in the London literary scene, including Martin Amis, Ian Hamilton, Julian Barnes and Ian McEwan. Clive James named his second book of literary criticism (At the Pillars of Hercules) after it.

In the mid-eighteenth century, no. 9 was the location of the Turk's Head Tavern, where a well-known lodge of Freemasons met. The Ancient Grand Lodge of England was organized there on 17 July 1751.

The Coach and Horses pub, also known as Norman's, famous for the rudeness of its former landlord Norman Balon, is at no. 29, at the corner with Romilly Street. The fortnightly editorial lunch of Private Eye is held in the Coach and Horses. There has been a public house of that name on the site since the 1720s.

No. 47 is known for having provided temporary lodgings for Giacomo Casanova, famed Venetian adventurer and author, in 1764.

No. 49, on the west side of Greek Street, was the home of the legendary folk music club Les Cousins.

No. 58 was a temporary lodging for Thomas De Quincey in 1802, as described in Part I of Confessions of an English Opium-Eater.

The noted Victorian sheet music lithographer Alfred Concanen was living at no. 66 with his wife and children in 1861.

In the southern part of the street, past Old Compton Street, no. 28 is the site of Maison Bertaux, a renowned French pâtisserie, founded in 1871. Owned by sisters Michele and Tania Wade, it is known as the headquarters of the artist Martin Firrell. The upstairs tea room shows work by comedian and artist Noel Fielding and members of Icelandic band Sigur Rós, among others. It is also the home of the Maison Bertaux Theatre Club, which performs within the tiny confines of the shop.

The street is the setting for the 1930 film Greek Street, directed by Sinclair Hill and starring Sari Maritza and William Freshman.

In the 1971 film Villain, the crime lord Vic Dakin (Richard Burton) recommends Greek Street as a venue of prostitution. "Try the Manhattan Club in Greek Street... lot of 'sunburnt' girls there... for twenty quid they'll do anything... enjoy yourself!"

"Hot Neon", a song featured in the 1976 British TV series Rock Follies, begins: "She writhes in her bed/ In her sweltering room/ In Greek Street/ She tosses and moans/ And her glistening sweat/ Stains the silk sheets/ She is dreaming of…/ Hot neon".

In the first series of the show Harlots, Greek Street is the location to which brothel owner Margaret Wells aspires to move her business, instead of remaining in Covent Garden.

=== Former occupants ===
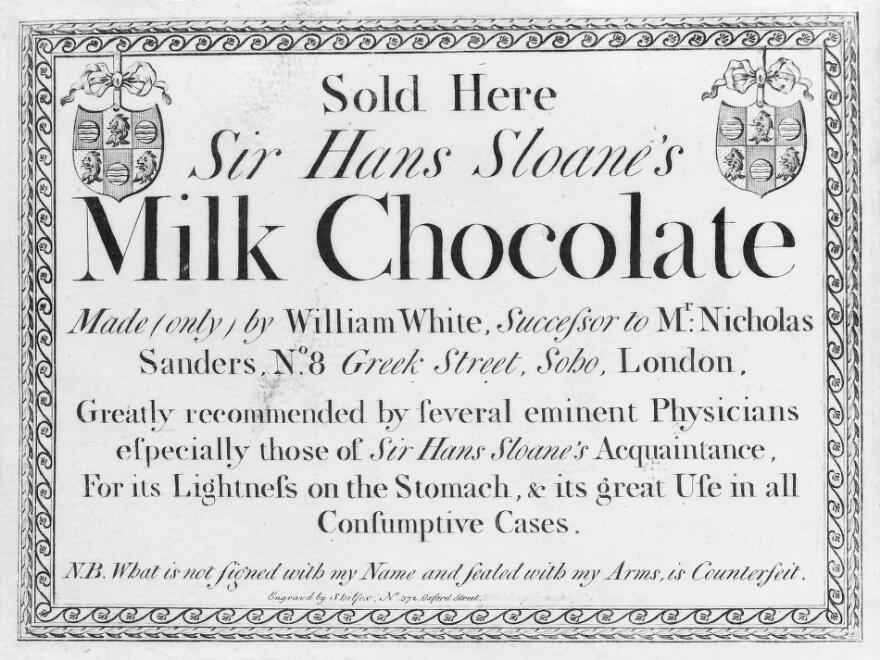
A trade-card for chocolate maker William White at No. 8

- No. 9: Turk's Head Tavern
- Nos. 12–13: Josiah Wedgwood (as pottery warehouse and showroom)
- No. 16: Le Beat Route (club in the 1980s)
- No. 17: Crab Tree Club
- No. 18: The Establishment Club
- No. 20: Hopkins Purvis & Sons, colour merchants
- No. 40: Soho House
- No. 47: Giacomo Casanova
- No. 49: Les Cousins
- No. 58: Thomas De Quincey
- No. 66: Alfred Concanen

== In the present day ==
Greek Street is known for its selection of restaurants and cafes, which currently include a Hungarian restaurant (The Gay Hussar at No. 2), an oriental organic vegetarian restaurant, a Thai restaurant, a pizzeria, a traditional Chinese restaurant, an Italian restaurant and a Moroccan and Lebanese restaurant. There is also a gallery, a whisky shop, several bars and some offices. At number 48 is L'Escargot, a Michelin-starred restaurant. There are also several "walk-ups" (providers of legal prostitution) along the street.

The street crosses Manette Street, Bateman Street, Old Compton Street and Romilly Street.

=== Current occupants ===
- No. 1: House of St Barnabas
- No. 2: The Gay Hussar
- No. 3: Milroy's of Soho
- No. 5: Greek Street Live & The Room Where It Happens
- No. 6: Gamma Gamma
- No. 7: Pillars of Hercules (now Bar Hercules under new ownership)
- No. 9: Jazz After Dark
- No. 10: 10 Greek Street
- No. 11: BiBimBap
- Nos. 12–13: Miabella
- No. 13A: Bar San Valentino (Valentino Cafe)
- No. 15: Westend Films
- No. 17: Be At One Cocktail Bar
- No. 18: Zebrano
- No. 20: Endor Productions
- Nos. 23–24: Maison Touareg Restaurant
- No. 25: The Three Greyhounds (Public House)
- No. 26: Pop-up Shop (varying short-term occupants)
- No. 28: Maison Bertaux
- No. 29: Coach and Horses
- No. 34: Viet Pho
- Nos. 35–36: Yming
- No. 40: Soho House
- No. 48: L'Escargot
- No. 49: Club49
- No. 50: Union Private Members Club
- No. 51: Trattoria Da Aldo
- No. 53: Thirst Bar
- No. 54: Chin Chin Club
- No. 55: Lick
- No. 57: The New Evaristo Club
- No. 58: Balls and Company
