= Carlo Norway =

German-British artist (1886–1957)

Bernhard Carl Scholz (15 April 1886 – 1957), known as Carlo Norway, was a German-British artist renowned for his work across various spectrums, with a specialization in lino-cuts. He was also a member of the Decorative Art Group, which was founded in 1916.

Norway's artistic journey included studying at Colarossi's in Paris and later at the Royal Academy in Dresden, emphasizing his dedication to honing his craft. His artistic pursuits took his across Europe, contributing to the depth of his experiences and artistic influences.

Before the outbreak of the First World War, Norway had already established himself as a prominent figure within London's bohemian circles and was known to frequent the Crab Tree Club. However, his artistic endeavors were not without criticism. In 1919, Ezra Pound delivered a critical review of his work at the Adelphi Gallery, characterizing Norway as being in an "aggravated state of utter uncertainty, hoping to please everybody at once".

Despite the challenges, Norway persisted in his artistic pursuits. In 1926, he exhibited at the Chester Gallery in London, further contributing to his artistic legacy.

Norway's personal life was complex. In 1916, he married Bertha Pauline Maria Kremser. However, in 1929, believing himself to be a widower, he married Ethel Annie Griffiths-Lester. The discovery that Bertha was still alive led to a series of events resulting in her death in a London hospital. Following her death, Norway remarried Ethel, solidifying their union.
