= Amelia Bayntun =

English actress (1919–1988)

- Born: Amelia Ellen Bayntun; 31 March 1919; Bristol, England
- Died: 19 January 1988 (aged 68); Islington, London, England
- Occupation: Actress

Amelia Bayntun (31 March 1919 – 19 January 1988) was an English stage and television actress.

== Career ==
Bayntun started her stage career in 1937, when she joined the Bristol Unity Players. During World War II, she was in Stars in Battledress performing in Italy and Austria after the end of hostilities. In between engagements, she ran a pub with her husband, and occasionally sang as Marie Lloyd at London's Players' Theatre. In 1960 she appeared on stage in Joan Littlewood's production of Sparrers Can't Sing at the Theatre Royal Stratford East, and in its later West End transfer. She played in the TV series Dixon of Dock Green in early 1962, and in the same year was chosen to play the part of Mrs Blitzein in Lionel Bart's musical Blitz!. In this she became a great hit and played the part for the full 568 performances. After this she was not seen in any major role. She played in a number of Carry On films and on TV, including an episode of On the Buses, usually as an elderly cockney or battleaxe.

== Filmography ==
- Thunderball (1965) – Mrs Karlski (uncredited)
- Carry On Camping (1969) – Mrs Fussey
- Carry On Loving (1970) – Corset Lady
- The Railway Children (1970) – Cook (uncredited)
- Carry On at Your Convenience (1971) – Mrs Spragg (uncredited)
- Carry On Matron (1972) – Mrs Jenkins
- Carry On Abroad (1972) – Mrs Tuttle

== British TV series ==
- Dixon of Dock Green (1962) – Mrs. Taylor
- The Wednesday Play:
  - Tomorrow, Just You Wait (1965) – Ada Gorbet
  - The Big Man Coughed and Died (1966) – Mona's mother
- Adam Adamant Lives! (1966) – Charity
- Z-Cars (1969) – Lily Oldham
- On the Buses:
  - Lost Property (1971) – Woman
- Albert! (1971-1972) – Mrs. Ada Bissel (regular role – series 3 & 4)
- Play for Today:
  - Edna, the Inebriate Woman (1971) – Jessie, a Tramp
  - Man Above Men (1973) – Mrs. Marshall
