= The Borderline (music venue) =

Former London music venue

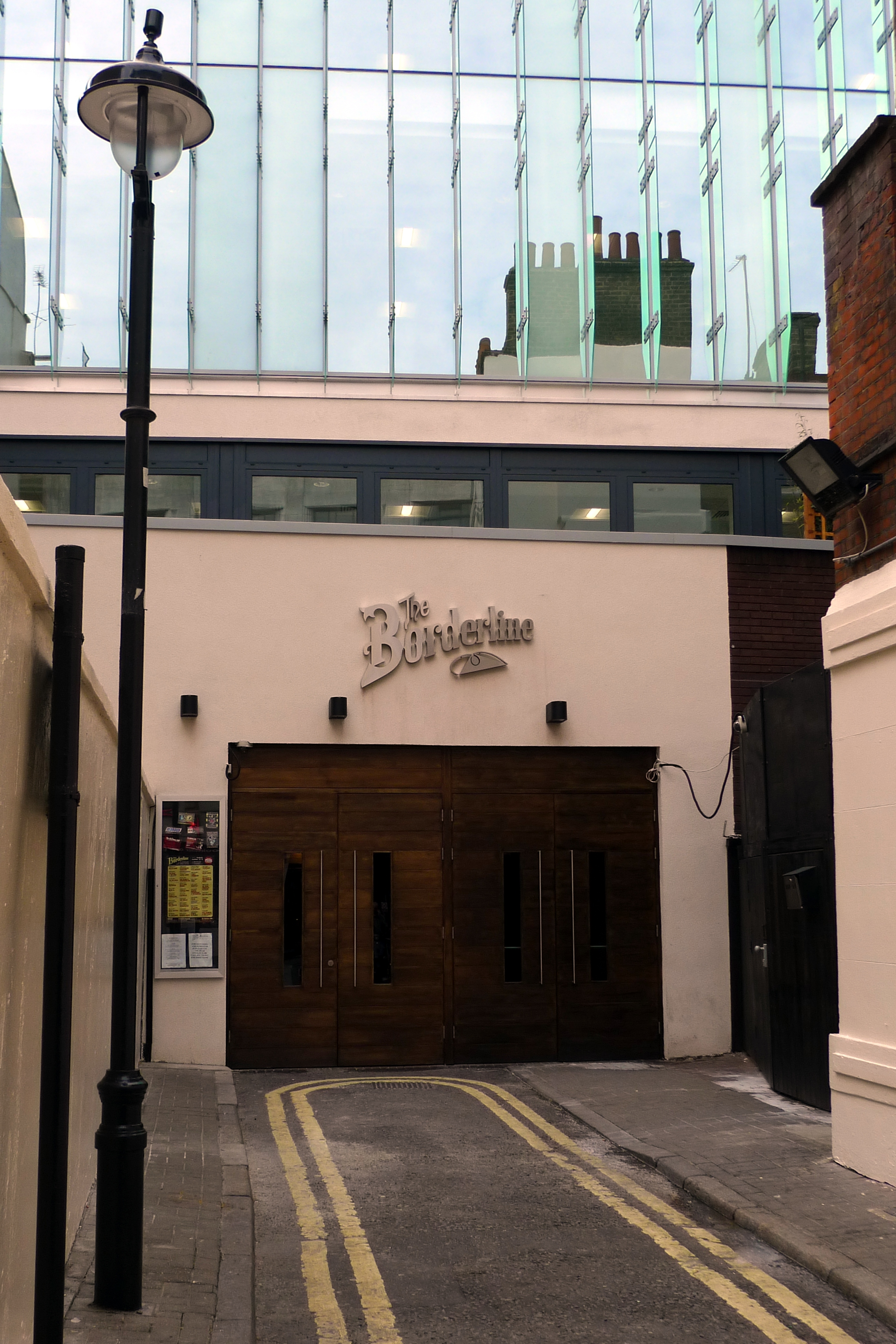
- Entrance on Orange Yard (2009)
- Interactive map of The Borderline
- Location: Orange Yard; Manette Street; London, W1D 4JB
- Coordinates: 51.514889°N 0.130417°W
- Capacity: 200-300
- Public transit: Tottenham Court Road

Construction
- Opened: 1985
- Closed: 31 August 2019

The Borderline was a London music venue on the eastern edge of Soho at Orange Yard and Manette St, off Charing Cross Road. Hosting a variety of acts in rock and roots music, the small basement club was a foundational part of the live music scene in the West End from 1985 to 2019.

== History ==
Founded by Stephen Jeffries and Mark Yates in the late 70's and later taken over by Ian Howard and John Northcote in 1985, The Borderline opened in the basement of tex mex restaurant Break for the Border, located at 127-133 Charing Cross Rd. With a small stage and a capacity for 200 to 300, the underground space soon became known for its intimate atmosphere. By the 1990s, the club cemented its reputation as an excellent stop for up-and-coming names in rock and roll. R.E.M., Oasis, Pearl Jam, Blur, Muse, and Counting Crows made appearances relatively early in their careers, as did singer-songwriters such as Sheryl Crow, PJ Harvey, and Jeff Buckley. The venue was also known for hosting figures such as Debbie Harry and Black Francis as they performed their solo work. Later in the decade, The Borderline became an important center for Americana. Townes Van Zandt, Emmylou Harris, Béla Fleck and the Flecktones, Uncle Tupelo, The Jayhawks, The Sadies, Whiskeytown, The Drive-By Truckers, Over the Rhine, Sarah Harmer, and Josh Ritter all played the basement stage.

As the music industry increasingly consolidated, the ownership of The Borderline changed hands several times. In 2003, Vince Power's Mean Fiddler Group added the club to its stable of venues. In 2007, as Mean Fiddler rebranded as Festival Republic, Music and Media Assets (MAMA) acquired the club. As MAMA was absorbed into Live Nation, DHP Family purchased the club in 2016. DHP temporarily closed the venue for extensive refurbishment and reopened the space with a thoroughly revamped décor and an upgraded sound system in March 2017. However, citing rising rents due to ongoing real estate developments in the area, DHP permanently closed the doors of The Borderline in August 2019.

== Notable events ==
- On March 14 and 15, 1991, as part of the promotional tour for Out of Time, R.E.M. played two nights as Bingo Hand Job. Although the performance was widely bootlegged by fans for years, R.E.M. eventually released an official recording for Record Store Day in 2019.
- In August 1994, the venue served as the set for the music video for the Oasis single "Cigarettes & Alcohol."
- On 3 December 1996, just four weeks before his death, Townes Van Zandt played his last public show on The Borderline stage.
- On 27 July 2013, Mick Farren died on stage while performing with his band, The Deviants.
