= Metropolitan Commission of Sewers =

United Kingdom legislation

- Abbreviation: MCS
- Predecessor: Sewer commissions of: Tower Hamlets; St Katharine's; Poplar and Blackwall; Holborn and Finsbury; Westminster and Middlesex; Surrey and Kent; Greenwich; Regent's Park
- Successor: Metropolitan Board of Works
- Formation: 1 January 1849
- Dissolved: 1 January 1856
- Type: Ad hoc board
- Legal status: Statutory authority
- Headquarters: 1 Greek Street
- Location: London, United Kingdom
- Coordinates: 51.5149°N 0.1313°W
- Origins: Metropolitan Commission of Sewers Act 1848
- Region served: Inner London
- Members: 21 (1854–1856)
- Chairman: Richard Jebb
- Engineer: Joseph Bazalgette
- Board of directors: Commissioners
- Parent organization: Government of the United Kingdom

The Metropolitan Commission of Sewers was one of London's first steps towards bringing its sewer and drainage infrastructure under the control of a single public body and was formed in 1848. It was absorbed by the Metropolitan Board of Works on 1 January 1856, as a result of the Metropolitan Sewers Act 1855.

== Formation ==
Metropolitan Sewers Act 1852
- Act of Parliament
- Parliament of the United Kingdom
- Long title: An Act to continue and amend the Metropolitan Sewers Act.
- Citation: 15 & 16 Vict. c. 64
- Territorial extent: United Kingdom

Dates
- Royal assent: 30 June 1852
- Commencement: 30 June 1852 (Note: The Acts of Parliament (Commencement) Act 1793.)
- Expired: 7 August 1853 (Note: Section 3.)
- Repealed: 11 August 1875

Other legislation
- Amends: Metropolitan Commissioners of Sewers Act 1848; Metropolitan Sewers Act 1849; Metropolitan Sewers Act 1851
- Repealed by: Statute Law Revision Act 1875

Status: Repealed

Text of statute as originally enacted

Metropolitan Sewers Act 1853
- Act of Parliament
- Parliament of the United Kingdom
- Long title: An Act to continue and amend the Metropolitan Sewers Acts.
- Citation: 16 & 17 Vict. c. 125
- Territorial extent: United Kingdom

Dates
- Royal assent: 20 August 1853
- Commencement: 20 August 1853
- Expired: 7 August 1854 (Note: Section 1.)
- Repealed: 6 August 1861

Other legislation
- Amends: Metropolitan Commissioners of Sewers Act 1848
- Repealed by: Statute Law Revision Act 1861

Status: Repealed

Text of statute as originally enacted

Metropolitan Sewers Act 1854
- Act of Parliament
- Parliament of the United Kingdom
- Long title: An Act to continue and amend the Metropolitan Sewers Acts.
- Citation: 17 & 18 Vict. c. 111
- Territorial extent: United Kingdom

Dates
- Royal assent: 11 August 1854
- Commencement: 11 August 1854
- Expired: 7 August 1855
- Repealed: 11 August 1875

Other legislation
- Amends: Metropolitan Commissioners of Sewers Act 1848
- Repealed by: Statute Law Revision Act 1875

Status: Repealed

Text of statute as originally enacted

Metropolitan Sewers Act 1855
- Act of Parliament
- Parliament of the United Kingdom
- Long title: An Act to empower the Commissioners of Sewers to expend on House Drainage a certain Sum out of the Monies borrowed by them on Security of the Rates, and also to give to the said Commissioners certain other Powers for the same Purpose.
- Citation: 18 & 19 Vict. c. 30
- Territorial extent: United Kingdom

Dates
- Royal assent: 15 June 1855
- Commencement: 15 June 1855
- Repealed: 11 August 1875

Other legislation
- Amends: Metropolitan Commissioners of Sewers Act 1848
- Repealed by: Statute Law Revision Act 1875

Status: Repealed

Text of statute as originally enacted

The commission was formed by the Metropolitan Commission of Sewers Act 1848 (11 & 12 Vict. c. 112), partly in response to public health concerns following serious outbreaks of cholera. The commission's mandate was renewed and amended with supplementary acts:

- Metropolitan Sewers Act 1851 (14 & 15 Vict. c. 75)
- Metropolitan Sewers Act 1852 (15 & 16 Vict. c. 64)
- Metropolitan Sewers Act 1853 (16 & 17 Vict. c. 125)
- Metropolitan Sewers Act 1854 (17 & 18 Vict. c. 111)
- Metropolitan Sewers Act 1855 (18 & 19 Vict. c. 30)

Commissioners included Sir Edwin Chadwick, Robert Stephenson and Thomas Field Gibson.

The new body combined eight local boards of commissioners that had been established by earlier acts of Parliament:

- Tower Hamlets Commission of Sewers
- St Katherine's Commission of Sewers
- Poplar and Blackwall Commission of Sewers
- Holborn and Finsbury Commission of Sewers
- Westminster and Middlesex Commission of Sewers
- Surrey and Kent Commission of Sewers
- Greenwich Commission of Sewers
- Commissioners of the Regent's Park Sewers

The area covered by the Metropolitan Commission was defined as the City and Liberties of Westminster, the borough of Southwark, the areas of the previous commissioners and "any such other place in the Counties of Middlesex, Surrey, Essex and Kent or any of them, being not more than twelve miles distant in a straight line from St. Paul's Cathedral, but not being in the City of London or the liberties thereof". No area was to be exempt from the commission's jurisdiction by virtue of being extra-parochial or beyond the ebb or flow of the tide. The headquarters of the commission were at 1 Greek Street, Soho.

The City of London was excluded as it had its own Commission of Sewers dating back to 1669.

== Activities ==
The commission surveyed London's antiquated sewerage system and set about ridding the capital of an estimated 200,000 cesspits, insisting that all cesspits should be closed and that house drains should connect to sewers and empty into the Thames (ultimately, a major contributing factor to "The Great Stink" of 1858).

The commission was notable in that it employed Joseph Bazalgette, who joined the commission in 1849 and later became the chief engineer. By the 1870s his proposals to modernise the London sewerage system were completed.

=== Chairmen ===
- Viscount Ebrington (1 January 1849 – 6 October 1851)
- Edward Lawes (6 October 1851 – 24 July 1852)
- Richard Jebb (24 July 1852 – 1 January 1856)

== See also ==
- Public Health Act 1848
- Medical Officer for Health
- Commissions of sewers
