= Blitz! =

- Original Cast Album
- Music: Lionel Bart
- Lyrics: Lionel Bart
- Book: Lionel Bart; Joan Maitland
- Productions: 1962 West End; 1990 West End revival 1990 UK Tour; 2000 West End revival 2020 Off West End revival

Blitz! is a musical by Lionel Bart. The musical, described by Steven Suskin as "massive", was set in the East End of London during the Blitz (the aerial bombings during World War II). The story drew on Bart's childhood memories of London's Jewish East End during the Blitz and, like most musicals, centred on a romance between a young couple, in this case a Jewish woman and a Cockney man, although the largest role and main point-of-view character is that of Mrs Blitztein, the young woman's mother. Steven Suskin describes it as "Abie's Irish Rose set against the burning of Atlanta." Bart himself described the play as "…three human stories inside an epic canvas; the major human conflict – the major plot – personifies the spirit of London and how that spirit developed during the period of the piece."

== Production history ==
Blitz! opened in London on 8 May 1962 at the Adelphi Theatre, while Bart's enormous West End success Oliver! was still running at the New Theatre, and after a successful pre-West End run at the Palace Theatre in Tottenham; at that time Oliver! had not yet been produced on Broadway. Blitz ran for 568 performances. It never ran on Broadway: between its scale and the fact that New Yorkers could hardly be expected to share Londoners' nostalgia for the period, it proved "unexportable". Bart wrote the music and lyrics, and had directed the original London production himself; Joan Maitland contributed to the libretto. Sean Kenny designed the elaborate sets, which included representations of Victoria Station, Petticoat Lane, and the Bank underground station, not to mention London on fire during an air raid. Four revolving house units and an enormous, mobile bridge, carried on two shifting towers, made it, at the time, the most expensive West End musical ever produced. Noël Coward called it "twice as loud and twice as long as the real thing."

The song "The Day After Tomorrow" was specially written by Bart for Vera Lynn. Lynn had been a star at the time of the German bombing attacks; in the play, the characters listen to Lynn sing it on the radio while they shelter underground. Lynn did not actually appear onstage during the production, but she recorded the song for it, and the production used her recording on the "radio". The play also makes use of a recording of a Winston Churchill radio speech.

The role of Mrs Blitztein was played by Amelia Bayntun in the original cast; it was her only role in a stage musical. The cast included a large number of children. There is a scene in which the children are to be evacuated from London; they cheerfully sing "We’re Going To The Country", while their mothers try to put on a cheerful face. The children's chorus "Mums and Dads" was a "showstopper" that drew much radio play.

The musical was never seen for many years, largely because the original scores went missing during Bart's turbulent years. It was reassembled in Australia by 19-year-old Andrew Jarrett, a Bart devotee, with orchestrations by Kevin Hocking, Jack Westmore and Stephen Smith. So impressed was Bart, that he came out of obscurity and travelled to Australia for Jarrett's triumphant production in 1985. The Royal Shakespeare Company's intended 1990 revival (for the fiftieth anniversary of the Blitz) never happened, although the National Youth Theatre did revive it in London's West End at the Playhouse Theatre in September 1990, with Jarrett imported as music director. This production was directed by Edward Wilson and choreographed by David Toguri, with the role of Mrs Blitzstein played by Jessica Stephenson (now Jessica Hynes, an established UK screen actor). According to the review in The Guardian, "Edward Wilson's production for the NYT is necessarily more modest and contains some beautiful, slate-grey designs from Brian Lee: his backdrop of a soaring-arched Victorian railway terminus is stunning. David Toguri's musical staging shows his customary flair, camouflaging the cast's vocal weaknesses by bringing out their physical athleticism. And Jessica Stevenson as the mob-capped Mrs Blitzstein admirably conveys truculent working-class defiance." Benedict Nightingale wrote in his review: "But the strongest performance comes from Jessica Stevenson as a Jewish matriarch able to sing a silly song about baking cakes being the answer to all ills, yet remain quietly dignified throughout. Here is an apprentice actress to encourage." This production became the basis for a touring Northern Stage Company revival starring Diane Langton as Mrs Blitztein.

A revival production of Blitz was put on at the Queens Theatre in Hornchurch in 2000 including members of the Queens Theatre's own youth groups playing many characters alongside the resident cast.

== Plot ==
The story focuses on two families, the Jewish Blitzteins and the Cockney Lockes. Mrs Blitztein and Alfie Locke have adjacent stalls on Petticoat Lane: she sells herring, he sells fruit; they do not like each other. Their children, Georgie Locke and Carol Blitztein, are in love with one another.

=== Act 1 ===
The action opens on Bank underground station where the residents of Petticoat Lane are sheltering from yet another air raid ("Our Hotel"). Amongst them are the two prominent families of the street, the Blitzteins, led by their patriarchal mother, and the Lockes, led by father Alfred. The two welcome home their respective sons Georgie Locke and Harry Blitztein who are home on embarkation leave for a week before shipping out to fight in the army. Harry has a new (older) girlfriend in tow, Joyce, who is not only not Jewish but married, much to his mother's horror. Georgie, meanwhile, has caught sight of Mrs Blitztein's daughter Carol, who has grown into a beautiful young woman during his absence and is instantly smitten.

Carol likewise is rather struck by the young soldier and they quickly hit it off, before their parents interfere, resulting in their usual round of bickering which never involves them directly speaking to each other but rather through other people ("Tell Him, Tell Her"). As the argument settles down, Georgie pulls Harry to one side to inform him that he is in love with Carol. Whilst Harry is not against such a relationship, he advises against it as he knows there could be trouble ("I Wanna Whisper Something"). The wireless is put on so the residents can listen to the news, which includes a speech by Winston Churchill, and a song by Vera Lynn ("The Day After Tomorrow"). Ernie Nearmiss, Alf's best friend and fellow air raid warden, arrives to inform those in the shelter that the Blackwell's house has been destroyed by a bomb and that Mr and Mrs Blackwell were still inside at the time, having refused to go down to the shelter.

Their son Tommy, who is in the shelter with the Blitzteins, is thankfully asleep and doesn't hear, but Mrs Blitztein decides that she will send Tommy with her own son Siddy into the country for safety. Mrs Blitztein then sings Siddy to sleep ("Our Hotel Lullaby"). The next day, the children of the street, apart from Georgie's sister Franie, are assembled to be evacuated and are waved goodbye by their mothers ("We're Going to The Country"). No sooner have the children gone than the bombings get worse; the firemen and air raid patrol are kept very busy and every morning the residents of Petticoat Lane emerge from the shelter not knowing what to expect but determined not to let it get them down ("Another Morning"). On this particular day, they emerge to find the gas mains has been hit and they are not allowed into their homes. Princelet Street has also been completely destroyed leaving several families homeless, including the Murphys and Sens. Alf takes the Murphys in whilst Mrs Blitztein accommodates the Sens. Mrs Blitztein is very frustrated and begins to have a long rant about Hitler, soon joined by the others ("Who's This Geezer Hitler?"). Harry re-appears after a week's disappearance and he is immediately put to work by his mother as punishment for not telling her where he was.

Carol and Georgie manage to get a minute to themselves and it is revealed that they have been spending a lot of time together over the last week. Georgie, prior to leaving for duty the next day, asks Carol if she'll wait for him, but before she can answer their parents appear once again. Mrs Blitztein is in full flow about her children and how they have disappointed her – Carol by breaking off her relationship with a Jewish boy because of Georgie, and now Harry for having relations with a married woman ("Be What You Wanna Be"). An official appears on the scene to conduct a census of all the people in the area who have foreign-sounding names to find out how many there are and how long they've been in the area. Whilst this is going on, Alf and Ernie engage in a patriotic rant ("As Long As This Is England"). That night, Carol and Georgie sneak out together to spend one last night together before Georgie goes abroad.

Their parents look for them but in vain. Carol and Georgie have a laugh at both their parents and their stubborn ways, and reflect on how the fact they are from such different backgrounds actually make them more suited ("Opposites"). They are interrupted by the air raid siren but, rather than go down to the shelter, they take cover in a doorway ("Magic Doorway"). Mrs Blitztein, searching for Harry, discovers them and is not less than impressed. Georgie volunteers to pay Joyce a visit and see if Harry is there. Carol meanwhile goes to find Harry herself, leaving Mrs Blitztein alone with her cake tin ("Bake a Cake"). She then overhears Buddyboy and Bird in the process of stealing lead pipes and is shocked to discover Harry amongst them. Harry announces to his mother he is not going back to the army as he's had enough. Mrs Blitztein is about to go after him when a bomb goes off nearby, followed by a scream from Carol.

The next day at Victoria Station, Georgie is waiting for Carol to see him off and for Harry to report for duty. When Harry doesn't show, Elsie, his former girlfriend who is still rather taken with him, tries to buy him time by distracting the Sergeant Major ("Leave It To The Ladies"). Mrs Blitztein arrives after having been at the hospital with Carol all night and is upset that Harry has not turned up. She informs Georgie that Carol was unable to come and see him off. Georgie informs Mrs Blitztein of his love for Carol and his intention to marry her when he returns, and is surprised when she agrees and seems more gentle towards him than before. The soldiers depart and Mrs Blitztein is left alone.

=== Act 2 ===
Act Two opens six months later with Carol (now blind after the bomb blast) alone on Petticoat Lane, thinking of Georgie, who she has not seen at all in that time ("Far Away"). The Sunday market is slowly beginning to set up and people are discussing Carol and how the bombing seems to have calmed down at last. Alf is pleased as he's had a letter from Georgie to say he's coming home for good after losing a kidney, and, even better, he doesn't want Carol or her mother to know he's coming, which Alf believes means he's going to finish with Carol.

The market is soon in full swing ("Petticoat Lane") and the children return from the country ("We've Been To See The Country"). The market starts its usual business, with Elsie commenting on the variety of people one meets at the Petticoat Lane market ("Down The Lane"). Carol, who is helping out on her Mum's pickled herring stall, asks Mrs Blitztein if what Franie has told her about Georgie coming home is true. Mrs Blitztein is forced to admit it is. Carol is confused as to why Georgie did not tell her he was coming home and worries that he has gone off her because she is blind. Mrs Blitztein tries to reassure her daughter but is secretly thinking the same thing. The Military Police arrive to enquire about Harry's whereabouts as he is still on the run from the army. They are followed by Joyce who has not seen Harry herself in a long time. Mrs Blitztein is in despair – her daughter is blind and unhappy and her son is a crook on the run. In a moment of desperation, she offers up a prayer to her late husband Jack, pleading for guidance ("So Tell Me Jack").

That evening, the adults are assembling in the pub, leaving the children outside to amuse themselves with a game of Mums and Dads ("Mums and Dads"). After the other children are scared off by Tommy Blackwell and his horror book, Georgie emerges from the pub very drunk and depressed. Feeling a failure as a soldier, a son and a boyfriend, he is drowning his sorrows. He is approached by Harry, who reveals that he has spent the last six months working on the black market and hiding from the military but has come back to see Carol having only just heard about what happened in the explosion. Georgie confesses that he too is yet to see Carol and it's clear that whilst he wants to see her, he's too scared to do so. He makes out that Harry had the right idea running away, missing out on the fighting and death. Harry, on the other hand, seems to be fed up with life on the run and is clearly beginning to wish he had just faced his duty. The two agree to meet up later in the evening due to the area where they are being too public.

Georgie, now alone, goes into a drunken rant ("Who Wants To Settle Down"). Mrs Blitztein is next to discover him and she welcomes him home while trying to sound him out about Carol. Georgie admits the army was too much for him as all the killing and violence has altered his view on life and Carol probably wouldn't like the new him. Mrs Blitztein rubbishes the whole thing, telling Georgie that everyone has had to put up with the same thing at home and it hasn't changed any of them. She tells Georgie that she's very proud of him for going to fight for them and facing up to his responsibilities, unlike Harry of whom she is very ashamed. She admits she misjudged Georgie because of her dislike of his father but tells him that she would be proud to have Georgie in her family. Georgie admits he still loves Carol as much as he ever did, if not more, but he doesn't think he's good enough for her. Mrs Blitztein informs him that in Carol's eyes no one else apart from Georgie would be good enough. She goes to fetch Carol, whilst Georgie is reunited with his father and Franie.

Carol is brought to Georgie and the two enjoy an emotional reunion, during which Georgie proposes ("Is This Gonna Be A Wedding!"). Whilst preparations are made, Harry encounters Mrs Smith, who informs him of the impending marriage. Harry then breaks off his agreement with Buddyboy and Bird. At the wedding ("Is This Gonna Be a Wedding! (Reprise)"), Alf is still not happy about his son marrying a Blitztein but resigns himself to it, although not without a few snide remarks, particularly towards Mrs Blitztein. Georgie and Carol share their first dance ("Far Away (Waltz Reprise)"). Harry then appears to congratulate Georgie and Carol and announce he is going to fulfil his rightful duty by returning to the army ("Duty Calls"). The wedding party depart and Mrs Blitztein is left alone when a bomb hits. She is rescued from the rubble by Alf but neither are very gracious either in thanking or receiving that thanks and they leave still arguing, although in a huge step forward they are conversing directly rather than through other people. The crowd once again come together in union ("Who's This Geezer Hitler? – Reprise").

== Characters ==
- Mrs Blitztein – a typical Jewish matriarch and self-confessed "Queen of Petticoat Lane". She has spent her entire life trying to bring up her seven children in the proper Jewish way and is very disappointed that they have all in their own way rebelled. Her rival on the street is fruit and vegetable seller Alf Locke with whom she has an explosive relationship: neither can ever resist making snide comments to the other when they get the chance.
- Carol Blitztein – Mrs Blitztein's youngest daughter. She clearly loves her mother very much but is not willing to let her run her life. She is in a sort of relationship with a Jewish boy early in the show but she breaks it off when she falls in love with Georgie Locke.
- Harry Blitztein – the eldest son of Mrs Blitztein. He, like all his siblings, adores his mum but also finds her a pain and is not above rebellion even to the point of having Georgie Locke as his best friend. Harry is a typical Jack-the-Lad type and a huge hit with ladies, even the married ones.
- Alf Locke – owns the fruit and vegetable stall at the market and is Mrs Blitztein's nemesis. A World War I veteran, he is now Chief ARP Warden and, along with his mate Ernie Nearmiss, he takes the job very seriously. He is father to Georgie and Franie who he tries to keep on a tight leash with little success.
- Georgie Locke – eldest child and only son of Alf. Georgie is very different from his father, quiet and shy around people especially women. He joined the army at the start of the war and during basic training he made Lance Corporal.
- Ernie Nearmiss – Alf's best mate and fellow Warden. He takes the job very seriously and he has a high level of self-importance as result. If he hears about any trouble nearby that requires ARP attention he will head off in a flash to investigate and take charge.
- Elsie – Mrs Blitztein's lodger and Harry's on/off girlfriend. Like Harry, she is very popular with the opposite sex and has clearly had a string of boyfriends. When the Blackwells are killed in an air raid, Elsie seems to take on guardianship of their son Tommy.

== Original cast ==
- Mrs Blitztein – Amelia Bayntun
- Carol Blitztein – Grazina Frame
- Harry Blitztein – Tom Kempinski
- Siddy Blitztein – Kaplan Kaye
- Rachel Blitztein – Rose Hiller
- Cissy Blitztein – Julie Cohen
- Alfred ("Alfie") Locke – Bob Grant
- Georgie Locke – Graham James
- Frances Locke – Deborah Cranston
- Ernie Nearmiss – Edward Caddick
- Elsie – Toni Palmer
- The voice of Vera Lynn – Vera Lynn
- Impresario – Donald Albery
- Director – Lionel Bart
- Designer – Sean Kenny
- Costume designer – Bernard Sarron
- Lighting designer – Richard Pilbrow
- Musical director – Marcus Dods
- General manager – Anne Jenkins
- Stage manager – George Rowbottom

== Songs ==
Parenthetical names are individuals who sung the roles in the original cast, rather than character names.

=== Act 1 ===
- "Our Hotel" – Mrs. Blitztein & The Company
- "Tell Him-Tell Her" – The Company
- "I Want To Whisper Something" – Georgie Locke & Harry Blitztien
- "The Day After Tomorrow" – Vera Lynn & Company
- "Our Hotel Lullaby" – Mrs Blitztein
- "We're Going To The Country" – The Evacuees & Mums
- "Another Morning" – Alfie Locke, Ernie Nearmiss & The Company
- "Who's This Geezer Hitler?" – Mrs. Blitztein & The Company
- "Be What You Wanna Be" – Mrs. Blitztein & The Company
- "As Long As This Is England" – Alfie Locke, Ernie Nearmiss & Company
- "Opposites" – Georgie Locke & Carol Blitztein
- "Magic Doorway" – Georgie Locke & Carol Blitztien
- "Bake A Cake" – Mrs. Blitzstein
- "Leave It To The Ladies" – Elsie & The Ladies
- "The Day After Tomorrow" (Reprise) – The Company

=== Act 2 ===
- "Entr'acte" – The Orchestra
- "Far Away" – Carol Blitztein
- "Petticoat Lane (On A Saturday Ain't So Nice)" – Mr & Mrs Josephs & Company
- "Down The Lane" – Elsie & The Company
- "So Tell Me" – Mrs. Blitztein
- "It's Raining, It's Pouring" – The Kids
- "Mums and Dads" – The Kids
- "Who Wants To Settle Down" – Georgie Locke & Kids
- "Is This Gonna Be A Wedding"! – Mrs. Blitztein & The Company
- "Is This Gonna Be A Wedding!" (Reprise) – The Company
- "Far Away" (Waltz Reprise) – Georgie Lock, Carol Blitztein & The Company
- "Duty Calls" – Harry Blitztein & The Company
- "Who's This Geezer Hitler?" (Reprise) – The Company

"Far Away" was later a number 24 UK Singles Chart hit for Shirley Bassey.
