= Crab Tree Club =

Nightclub in London, England

Coordinates: 51.5140°N 0.1307°W

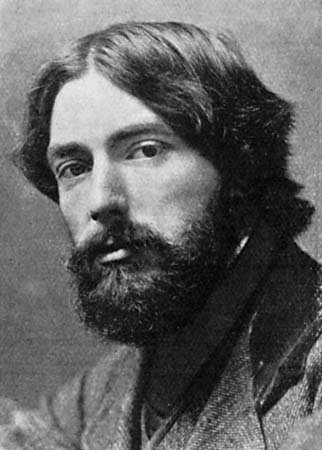
Augustus John founded the Crab Tree Club.

The Crab Tree Club was a nightclub in Greek Street, Soho, London, that was established by the painter Augustus John in April 1914 with the financial support of Thomas Scott-Ellis (Lord Howard de Walden). John wrote to his friend John Quinn, "We are starting a new club in town called the 'Crab-tree' for artists, poets and musicians... It ought to be amusing and useful at times". The club was a popular meeting place for London bohemians immediately before the First World War who would descend en-masse on the Crab Tree after the Café Royal closed for the night.

== Location ==
The club was above an R & J Pullman leather warehouse at 17 Greek Street, and was reached by climbing several flights of wooden stairs which was unusual as London clubs were more often subterranean.

== Clientele ==
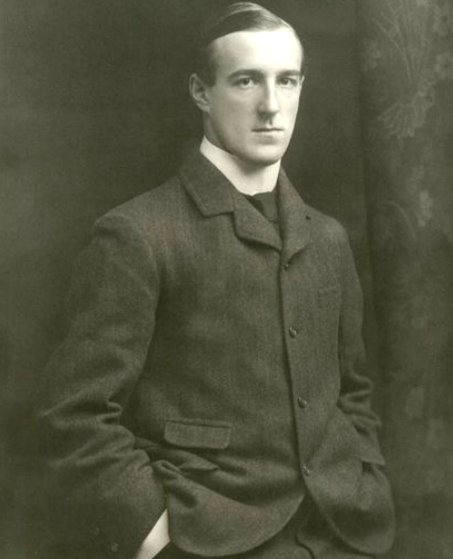
Thomas Scott-Ellis, 8th Baron Howard de Walden, was a financial backer for the Crab Tree.

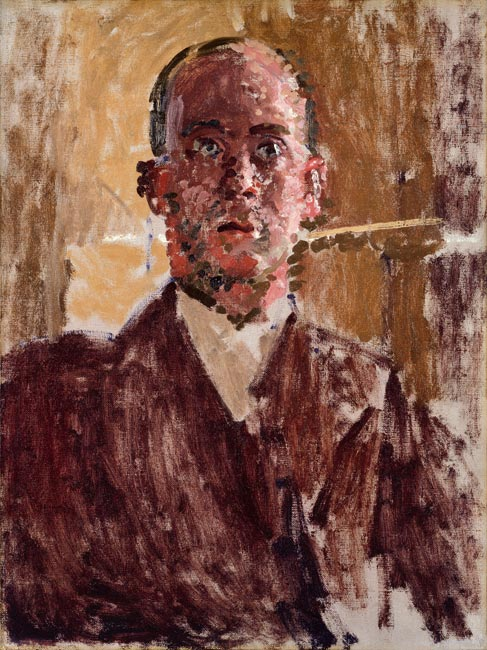
Harold Gilman painted by Walter Sickert, 1912. Both visited the club.

The clientele and members included Jacob Epstein, Augustus John, William Marchant (Director of the Goupil Gallery), Walter Sickert, Euphemia Lamb, Harold Gilman, Paul Nash, Carlo Norway, Henri Gaudier-Brzeska, Compton Mackenzie, a young Jean Rhys who almost lived there, journalists including "Mr Gossip" who wrote for The Sketch, shopkeepers, students from the nearby Slade School of Art and assorted artists and artist's models.

Paul Nash remembered that at the launch party Augustus John arrived extremely drunk while everyone else was still "sober and bored" but by 4.00 am, according to Mark Gertler, the party had got going and John "expressed a desire to be married then & there to all the women present."

== Atmosphere ==
The atmosphere at the Crab Tree was particularly informal. Betty May recalled in 1929 that the club was made up of "several rooms furnished with deal tables and chairs. There were no waiters, as we used to get everything for ourselves. There was often not even anyone to take the money for things. We used to leave it on the counter". One source of funds was the fine of one shilling levied on anyone who arrived in evening dress.

The customers doubled as the entertainment. According to Nina Hamnett, Betty May and Lilian Shelley were the "principal supports" of the club. Shelley would sing "My Little Popsy-Wopsy", a popular Edwardian music hall song, and May recalled that "everybody used to do something at the Crabtree. They danced or played or were amusing in one way or another. There used to be a stage there for small performances of one kind or another which we used to get up." There was a pole from the floor to the ceiling up which May often had to scamper if she had played a trick on someone. Another form of entertainment at the club was boxing matches.

The lack of staffing and the informal arrangements made the club attractive to those without very much money. According to Betty May, one of the advantages of the club was that you could have a meal just of bread and cheese and beer if that was all you wanted and you could have it at any time.

Not everyone liked the Crab Tree however. Paul Nash wrote to Albert Rutherston that it was "A most disgusting place! ... where only the very lowest city jews and the most pinched harlots attend. A place of utter coarseness and dull unrelieved monotony."
