= Nicholas Lander =

British restaurateur and writer on the restaurant industry

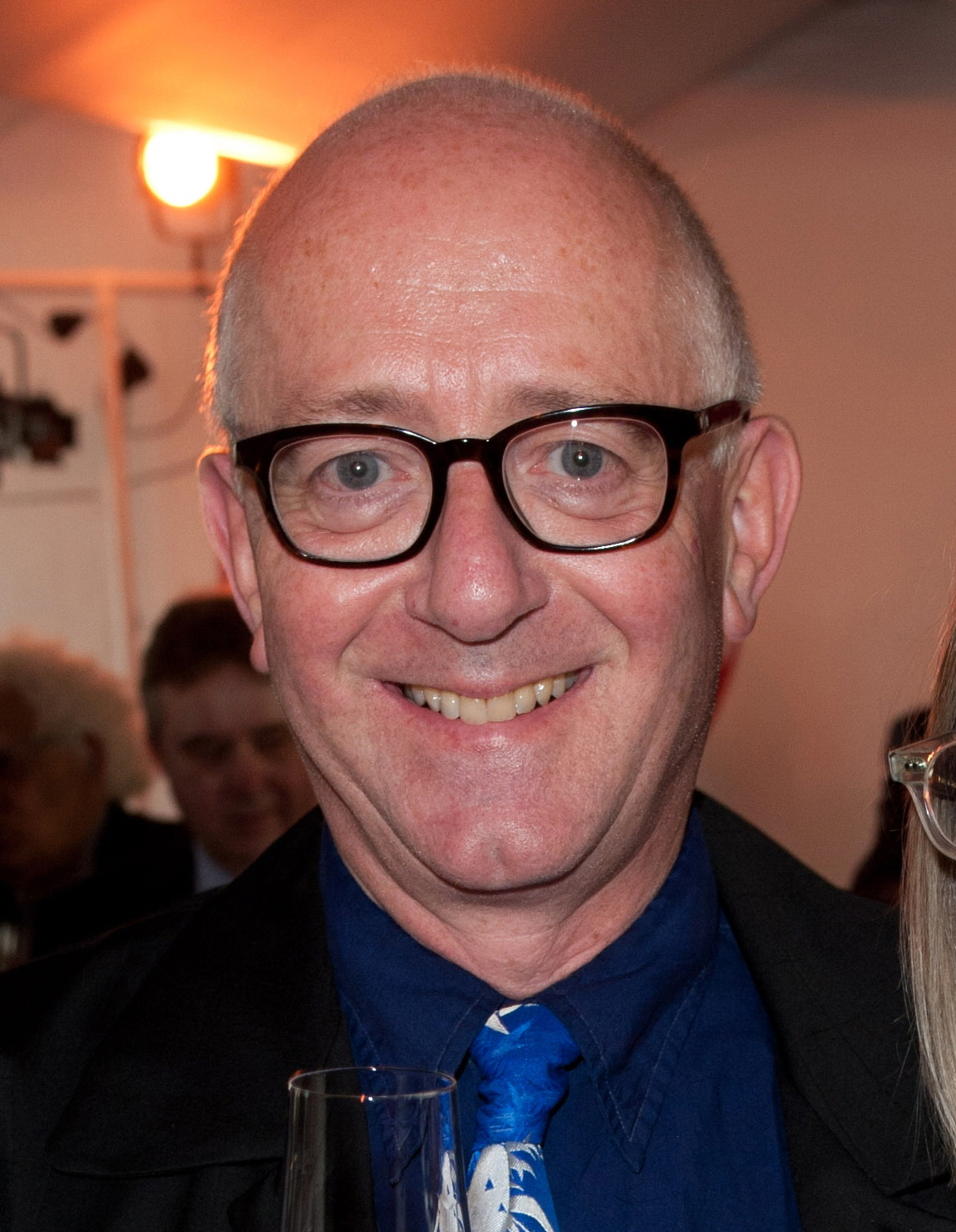
Nicholas Lander at Financial Times 125th Anniversary Party, London, in June 2013

Nicholas Laurence Lander is a British consultant to and writer on the restaurant industry.

== Early life and education ==
Lander studied at Manchester Grammar School, Jesus College, Cambridge, and Manchester Business School.

== Career ==
Lander established himself as one of Britain's foremost restaurateurs in the 1980s with L'Escargot restaurant in Soho, London.

From 1989 to 2022 he was the restaurant correspondent for the Financial Times, where his weekly columns, under the byline of 'The Restaurant Insider', looked at themes and trends in the restaurant industry. He now publishes weekly reviews of popular restaurants on JancisRobinson.com.

Lander has written a small number of books, including The Art of the Restaurateur (ISBN 978-0-7148-6469-3, 2012), an Economist Book of the Year, and Dinner for a Fiver (ISBN 0091783097, 1994).

He has also been a food service consultant to a selection of British arts organisations and companies.

He is a fanatical supporter of Manchester United and lists it under the 'clubs' section of his entry in Who's Who. He is married to the wine critic and expert Jancis Robinson.

He has been a food critic on BBC's MasterChef.

== Selected works ==
=== Books ===
- Lander, Nicholas; Robinson, Jancis (1994). Dinner for a fiver : over 150 best-value recipes from Britain's top restaurants. London: Vermilion.
- Lander, Nicholas (2007). Crisis Cook Book : The Crisis Cook Book comprises 84 recipes from 28 top chefs.
- Lander, Nicholas (2012). The art of the restaurateur. London: Phaidon Press.
- Lander, Nicholas (2016). On the Menu: The World’s Favourite Piece of Paper.

=== Critical studies and reviews ===
- Bilson, Gay (April 2013). "Dictators of the variable : the raked theatre of the restaurant". Australian Book Review. 350: 38, 40. Review of The art of the restaurateur.
