= Metropolitan Sewers Act 1851 =

Act of the Parliament of the United Kingdom

- Act of Parliament
- Parliament of the United Kingdom
- Long title: An Act to amend and continue the Metropolitan Sewer Act.
- Citation: 14 & 15 Vict. c. 75
- Territorial extent: United Kingdom

Dates
- Royal assent: 7 August 1851
- Commencement: 7 August 1851 (Note: The Acts of Parliament (Commencement) Act 1793.)
- Expired: 7 August 1851 (Note: Section 6.)
- Repealed: 11 August 1875
Other legislation
Amends	Metropolitan Commissioners of Sewers Act 1848; Metropolitan Sewers Act 1849
Repealed by	Statute Law Revision Act 1875

Status: Repealed

Text of statute as originally enacted

The Metropolitan Sewers Act 1851 (14 & 15 Vict. c. 75) was an act of the Parliament of the United Kingdom. The act extended and amended the Metropolitan Commission of Sewers Act 1848 (11 & 12 Vict. c. 112) and the Metropolitan Sewers Act 1849 (12 & 13 Vict. c. 93), which would have otherwise expired at the end of that session of Parliament, until the end of the session of Parliament underway on 7 August 1852. The Act was superseded by the further Metropolitan Sewers Acts in 1852, 1853, 1854 and 1855.

== Passage ==
The bill was introduced to the House of Commons by the Chancellor of the Exchequer Charles Wood and Edward Pleydell-Bouverie on 28 July. It was put to a committee of the whole House on 29 July, taking up most of the day's proceedings. Its third reading was on 31 July, where it was passed.

The bill did not pass entirely smoothly. The Caledonian Mercury reported that the second reading devolved into "[a] conversation of a somewhat angry character". Benjamin Hall and Thomas Wakley were outspoken opponents of the bill and the Metropolitan Commission of Sewers. Wakley moved that the bill stay in committee stage for three months and "objected to the public being taxed by any irresponsible body." Hall said that "[o]f all the inefficient commissions that ever existed in the metropolis, the Commission of Sewers was the worst."

== Provisions ==
The provisions of the act were:

- That the Queen may appoint commissioners from the Metropolitan Commission of Sewers to be the Commission's chair and deputy chair.
- That the salary of the Chair would be set at £1,000 per year.
- That the Chair would also be chair at Courts of Sewers and that they would hold a casting vote at such meetings.
- That the quorum for Commission meetings would be two.
- That for meetings of the Commission to raise rates, borrow money, make a mortgage or grant an annuity six Commissioners must be present.
- That six Commissioners need not be present if a court order allows otherwise.

== Subsequent developments ==
The whole act was repealed by section 1 of, and the schedule to, the Statute Law Revision Act 1875 (38 & 39 Vict. c. 66), which came into force on 11 August 1875.
