= Pillars of Hercules, Soho =

The Pillars of Hercules
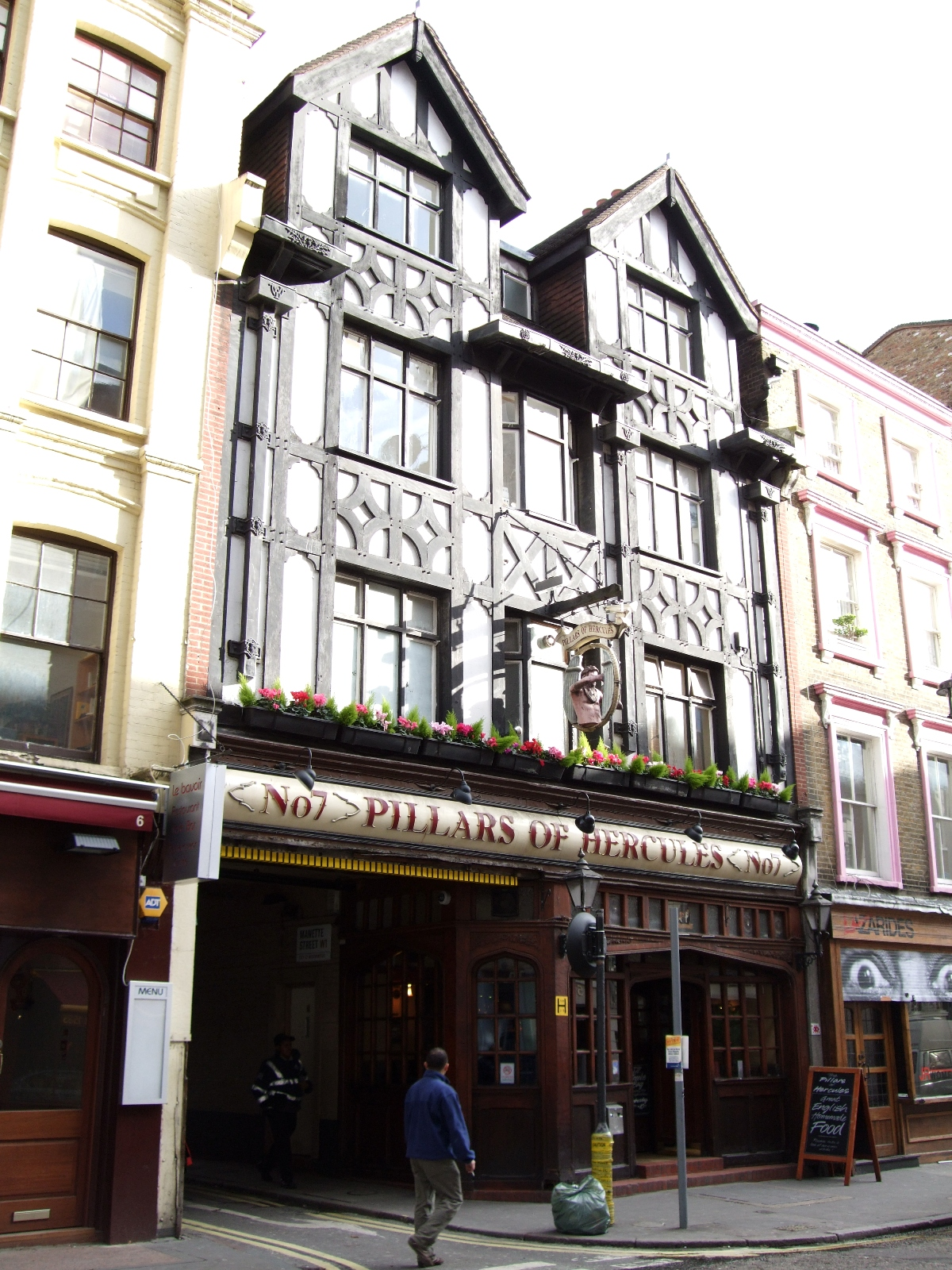
- The pub in 2008
- Interactive map of the The Pillars of Hercules area

General information
- Location: 7 Greek Street; London; W1
- Coordinates: 51°30′52″N 0°07′52″W

Bar Hercules, historically the Pillars of Hercules, was a pub in Greek Street, Soho, London, originally named for the Pillars of Hercules of antiquity. Most of what exists was built around 1910, but the pub dates back to 1733. The road at the side of the pub through the arch is named Manette Street, after Dr Manette, one of the characters from A Tale of Two Cities, who is described in the book as living near Soho Square.

More recently, the pub has been favoured by many figures from the London literary scene, including Martin Amis, Ian Hamilton, Julian Barnes and Ian McEwan. Clive James named his second book of literary criticism (At the Pillars of Hercules) after it, apparently because that was where most of the pieces within it were commissioned, delivered or written. Singer Nick Drake is also said to have frequented the pub during his time in London, and theatre designer Sean Kenny drank there with his staff in the 1960s, their design studio being a few steps from the pub's back door. The critic James Wood includes an anecdote set in the pub in his study The Irresponsible Self: On Laughter and the Novel (2004):

One London lunchtime, many years ago, the late poet and editor Ian Hamilton was sitting at his usual table in a Soho pub called the Pillars of Hercules. The pub was where much of the business of Hamilton's literary journal, The New Review, was conducted. It was sickeningly early—not to be at work, but to be at drink. A pale, haggard poet entered, and Hamilton offered him a chair and a glass of something. "Oh no, I just can’t keep drinking," said the weakened poet. "I must give it up. It's doing terrible things to me. It's not even giving me any pleasure any longer." But Hamilton, narrowing his eyes, responded to this feebleness in a tone of weary stoicism, and said in a quiet, hard voice, "Well, none of us likes it."

The pub closed on 24 February 2018, reopening later in the year as Bar Hercules under new owners Be At One. In 2022, the cocktail bar chain Simmons took over the pub.
