= Manette Street =

Street in Soho, London

Coordinates: 51.51475°N 0.13050°W

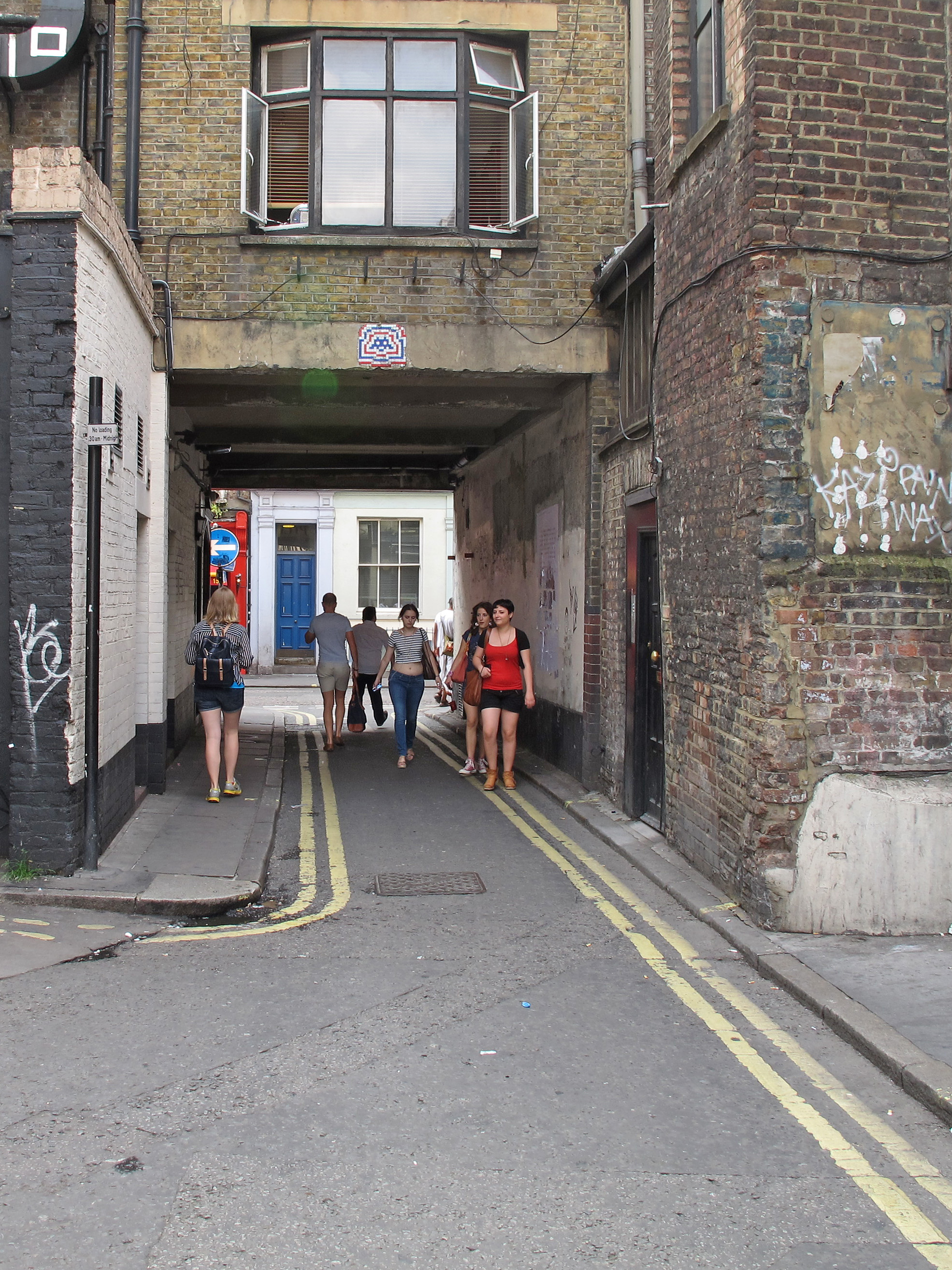
Manette Street, looking onto Greek Street

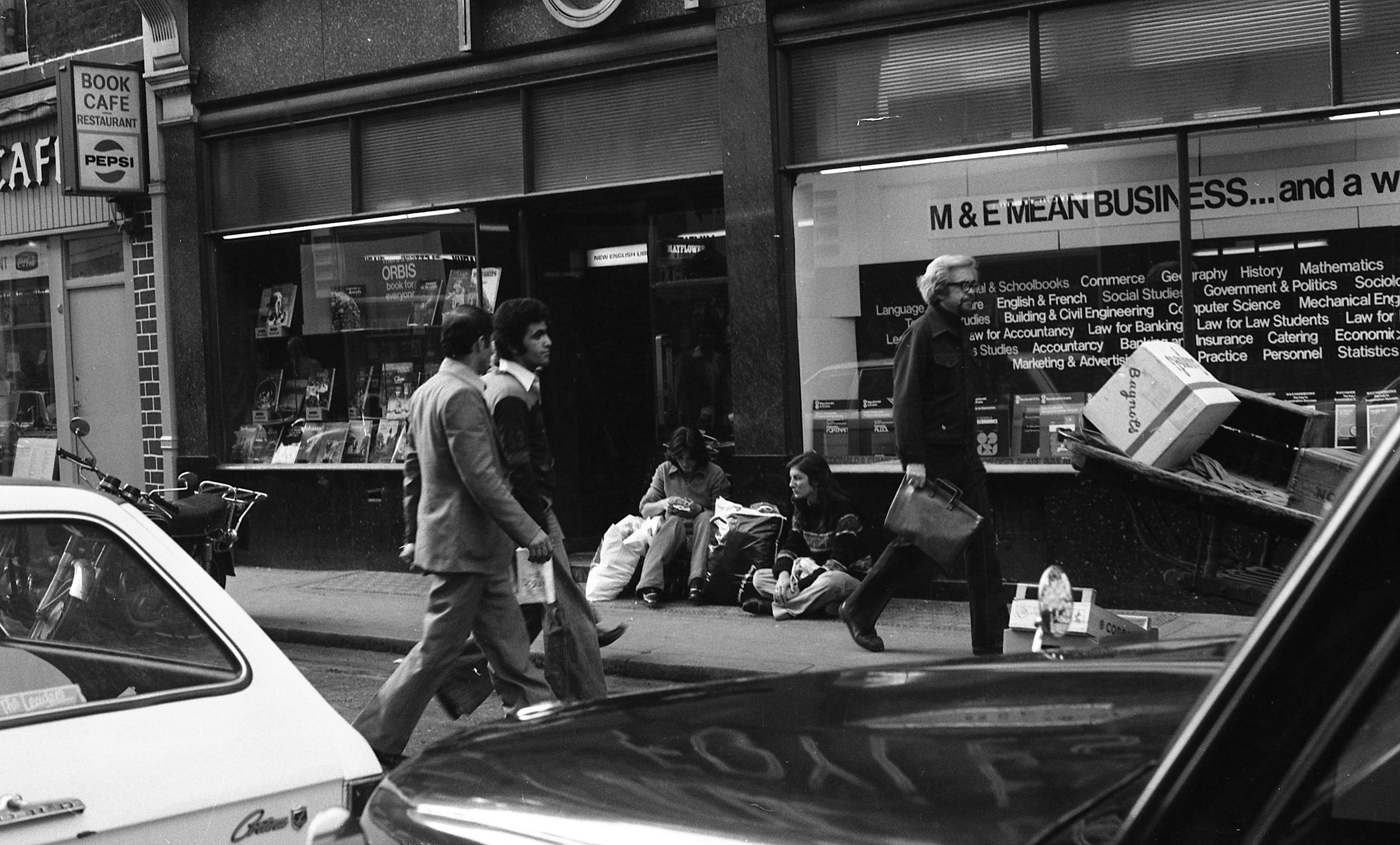
Foyles on Manette Street in 1976

Manette Street is a small street in the Soho area of London, linking the Charing Cross Road to Greek Street. Dating from the 1690s, and formerly named Rose Street, it is now named after the fictional character of Dr Manette in Charles Dickens's A Tale of Two Cities, who is described in the book as living on a quiet street corner "not far from Soho Square".

Buildings on the street include the Pillars of Hercules pub. The House of St Barnabas has a chapel and garden facing onto Manette Street, and an entrance to The Borderline nightclub is accessed from Manette Street. The street was home to the now-demolished Foyles Building and also Goldbeater's House, which had an arm-and-hammer sign outside it, a replica of the original described by Dickens in A Tale of Two Cities.

The street was associated with anarchism in the 19th century, in particular in association with the Rose Street Club, known for its popularity with radicals of all nationalities.
