= L'Escargot (restaurant) =

French restaurant in London

Coordinates: 51°30′50.2″N 0°7′51.6″W

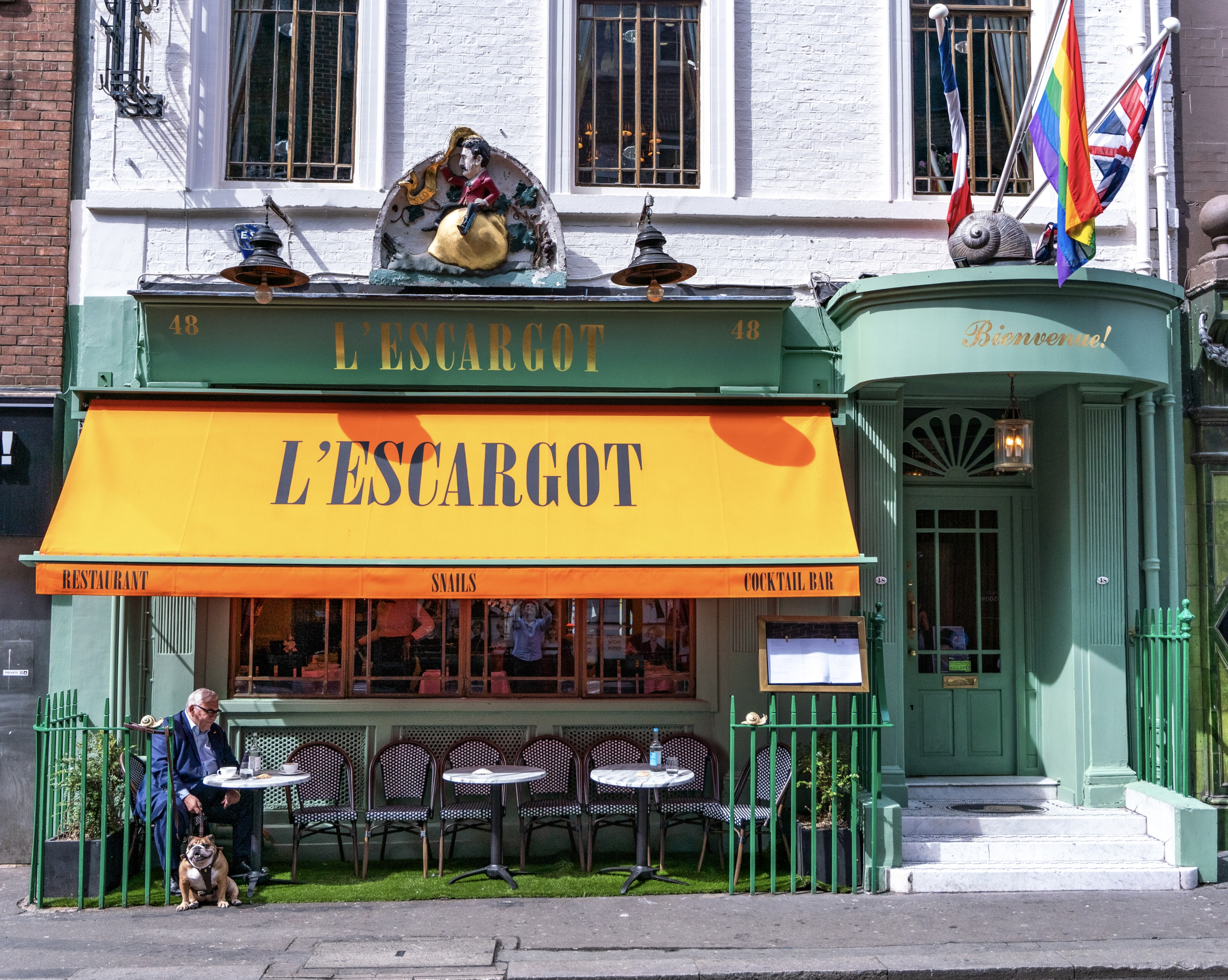
- Façade of the restaurant in 2024

Restaurant information
- Established: 1896; 129 years ago
- Location: 48 Greek Street, Soho, London, W1, United Kingdom
- Other information: Nearest station: Tottenham Court Road

L'Escargot is London's oldest French restaurant, and is also one of the city's oldest restaurants. It is housed in a Georgian townhouse on Greek Street, in the heart of the Soho district. The building, which dates from 1741, was previously the private residence of the Duke of Portland.

== History ==
Soho began to be developed after the Great Fire of London in 1666, when over 13,000 houses were destroyed and 100,000 citizens left homeless. The area, then called Soho Fields, was an obvious location for the wealthy to build their property, being within easy reach of the royal palaces of Westminster, Whitehall and St James's. The name Soho is said to derive from "so-ho", a popular hunting cry of the time.

Georges Gaudin established a restaurant in 1896 at the bottom end of Greek Street, called Le Bienvenue. He became famous for his snails, his being the first restaurant in England to serve the delicacy. When in 1927 he moved to larger premises at 48 Greek Street, his customers implored him to rename his restaurant L'Escargot after his most popular dish. He acquiesced, and called the new restaurant L'Escargot Bienvenue. His snail farm in the basement of the new restaurant became quite a talking point. A plaster bust of Gaudin riding a snail, with the motto "slow but sure", remains to this day on display outside the restaurant.

=== 1980s–1990s ===
After his retirement his son Alex ran the restaurant, and it established itself as the best French restaurant in London. Nick Lander and his wife Jancis Robinson, Master of Wine, took over the restaurant in 1981 and maintained its reputation as one of the best restaurants in London. They employed Elena Salvoni, widely recognized as one of the greatest restaurant managers of the 1980s, hence regulars often nicknamed the restaurant 'Elena's Place'.

L'Escargot was refurbished in 1992, when Jimmy Lahoud and chefs David Cavalier and Garry Hollihead took over the reins. Marco Pierre White took over as Head Chef when he went into partnership with Jimmy Lahoud at Quo Vadis restaurant on Dean Street and the restaurant was voted Best French Restaurant in London and Best Restaurant in Soho.

=== Recent Developments ===
In February 2014, L'Escargot was acquired by Brian Clivaz (of The Arts Club, Home House and Langan's Brasserie), Laurence Isaacson and a group of their friends. In 2023 Thomas Hitzlsperger, a former Premier League footballer and entrepreneur, acquired L'Escargot.

== The Snail Club ==
In February 2024, The Snail Club, a private members’ club, opened on the top floor of the restaurant.

== See also ==
- List of French restaurants
- List of restaurants in London
- Marcus Gleadow-Ware
- Paul Liebrandt
