= The Gay Hussar =

Restaurant In London, England

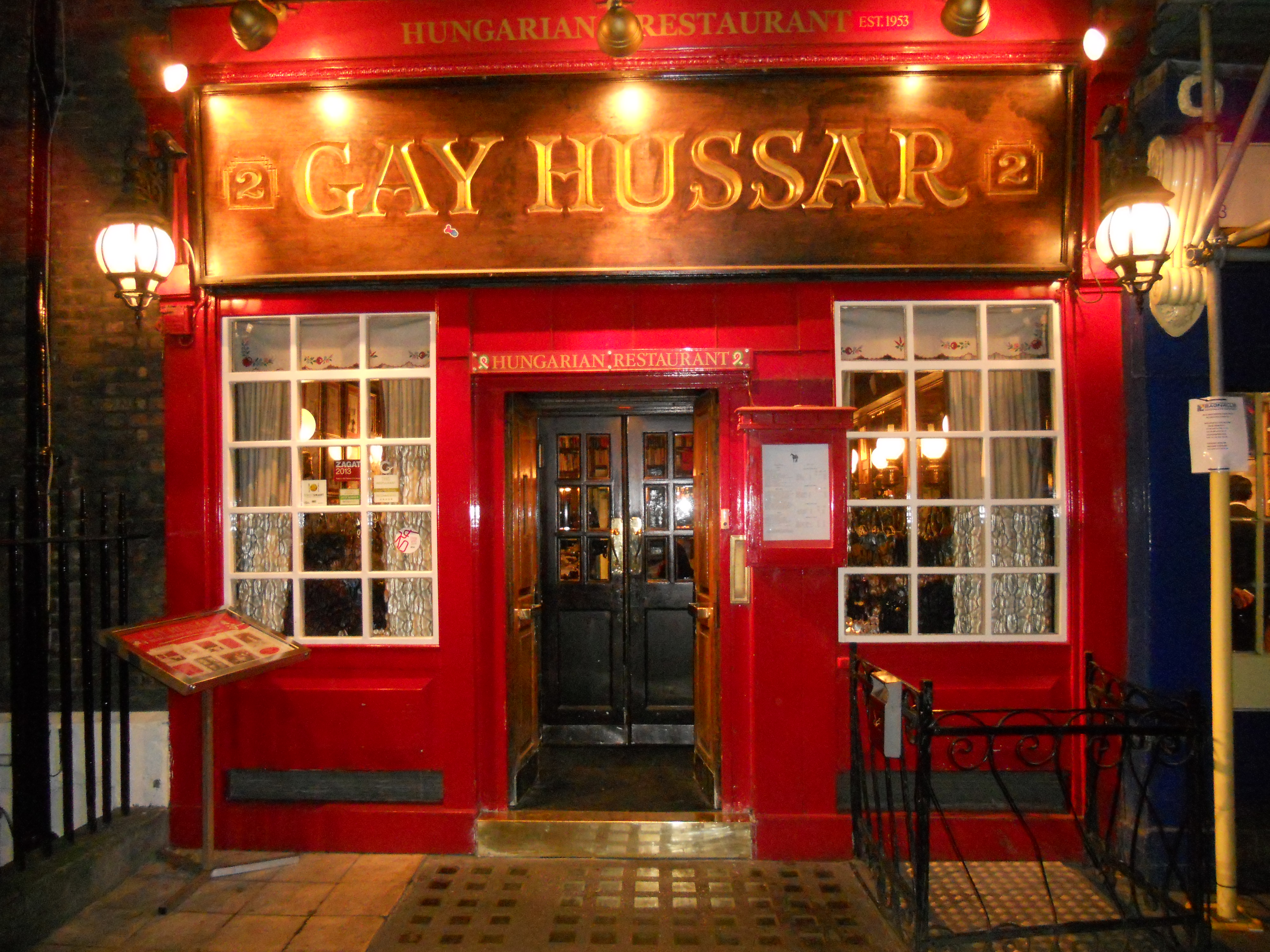
- The Gay Hussar in 2013
- Interactive map of The Gay Hussar

Restaurant information
- Established: 1953
- Closed: 2018
- Food type: Hungarian cuisine
- Location: 2 Greek Street, London, W1D 4NB, United Kingdom
- Coordinates: 51.5149°N 0.1313°W

The Gay Hussar was a celebrated Hungarian restaurant located at 2 Greek Street, Soho, central London, England. It was established in 1953 and closed in 2018.

== History ==
Victor Sassie was the founder of The Gay Hussar restaurant in 1953. Sassie was sent to Budapest in Hungary by the British Hotel and Restaurant Association when he was 17. He served his apprenticeship at the Gundel restaurant in Budapest. On his return to London in 1940, he established first the Budapest restaurant and then The Gay Hussar, which was to become popular with left-wing politicians. Diners included T. S. Eliot, Mortimer Wheeler, Aneurin Bevan, Barbara Castle, Ian Mikardo and Michael Foot.

The restaurant was named in honour of the elite Hussars of the Hungarian army. The name is also associated with the name of a popular Hungarian operetta, The Gay Hussars, by Emmerich Kálmán.

In October 2013, it was made known that owners Corus Hotels would put the Gay Hussar up for sale. A group of journalists, politicians and lawyers formed the "Goulash Co-operative Ltd" to raise money to secure the eight-year lease, but its bid was rejected by Corus. The restaurant closed in June 2018.

In 2020, a restaurant called Noble Rot Soho opened on the site.
