= Marcus Gleadow-Ware =

- Born: London, England
- Education: Académie Culinaire de France
- Culinary career
- Rating
- Michelin stars
- Current restaurant
- Aureole
- Website: chefmarcusware.com

Marcus Gleadow-Ware was the executive chef at Aureole, a defunct Michelin-starred restaurant in New York City.

== Career ==
Ware was raised in London where he worked as a pot washer at the Huntingdon Arms in Hemingford Road, Islington. When he was 16 years old, he began an apprenticeship under chef Anton Edelman at the Savoy Hotel. He obtained his culinary education at the Académie Culinaire de France. He gained further experience at notable European restaurants including Cliveden House Hotel, 1 Lombard Street, L'Escargot and The Clerkenwell, where he later became head chef.

In 2007, Ware moved to New York City and was soon recruited by Charlie Palmer to join his restaurant Aureole as senior sous chef. In 2011 he became executive chef of Aureole. Charlie Palmer describes Ware as an "extremely committed and talented chef ... His passion and dedication to the culinary arts shows on each and every beautiful dish he creates."

== See also ==
- List of Michelin-starred restaurants
