= Westminster and Middlesex Commission of Sewers =

- Successor: Metropolitan Commission of Sewers
- Founded: 1596; 430 years ago
- Dissolved: 1 January 1849; 177 years ago
- Legal status: Statutory authority
- Purpose: Public health, sewerage, drainage
- Headquarters: 1 Greek Street (from 1811)
- Location: Westminster, United Kingdom
- Coordinates: 51.5149°N 0.1313°W
- Region served: City and Liberty of Westminster and Middlesex
- Parent organization: Government of the United Kingdom

The Westminster and Middlesex Commission of Sewers was established in 1596 under the 1531 Statute of Sewers.

Its area was defined by the Westminster and Middlesex Sewers Act 1807 (47 Geo. 3 Sess. 1. c. vii), and prior to that by various letters patent.

In 1811 the commissioners leased 1 Greek Street, Soho, as their offices.

It was absorbed by the Metropolitan Commission of Sewers (which took over the Greek Street offices) on 1 January 1849.

Records are kept at the London Metropolitan Archives.
