= Abyss (Thelema) =

Concept from Thelemic mysticism

In Thelema, the Abyss represents a metaphysical concept that signifies the great chasm or void separating the manifest world from its divine source. Aleister Crowley, the founder of Thelema, extensively explored and integrated this concept into his esoteric teachings, imbuing it with deep spiritual significance.

The Abyss represents the formidable barrier that the adept must traverse to attain the grade of Magister Templi. This journey involves the complete dissolution of the ego and confronting Choronzon, the demon guardian of the Abyss, who embodies the chaotic and fragmentary nature of the mind that resists spiritual unification. Successfully crossing the Abyss signifies a profound transformation, marking the aspirant's progression towards higher consciousness and spiritual enlightenment.

Before attempting to cross the Abyss, a magician must achieve a significant milestone: the Knowledge and Conversation of the Holy Guardian Angel (K&C of the HGA). This attainment is crucial, as only those who have successfully established this divine communication are considered prepared to navigate the perils of the Abyss. The concept is deeply influenced by earlier mystical and esoteric traditions, particularly those of Jewish Kabbalah and Hermeticism, reflecting a synthesis of ancient wisdom and Crowley's innovative interpretations.

== Historical development ==
In the Qabalistic Tree of Life, the Abyss is symbolized by Da'ath, the hidden sephira that separates the lower sephiroth from the supernal triad of Kether, Chokmah, and Binah. This separation marks a significant metaphysical divide between the material and the divine.

In the Hermetic Order of the Golden Dawn, the concept of the Abyss as a significant divide was incorporated into their Qabalistic studies. The Golden Dawn also adopted and further developed Enochian magic, a system created by Dr. John Dee and Edward Kelley in the 16th century, which involves communication with angelic beings and the exploration of otherworldly realms. This foundational understanding influenced many members, including Aleister Crowley.

Aleister Crowley, a former member of the Golden Dawn, significantly expanded upon these teachings in his Thelemic system. His experiences and visions, particularly those documented in The Vision and the Voice, played a crucial role in shaping his understanding of the Abyss. During his exploration of the Enochian Aethyrs in the Algerian desert in 1909, Crowley, accompanied by his disciple Victor Benjamin Neuburg, encountered Choronzon, the demon guardian of the Abyss, an event that became a cornerstone of his metaphysical writings.

In Crowley's Thelemic system, it represents the point at which the individual ego must be completely annihilated to achieve higher states of consciousness and spiritual enlightenment, serving as a prerequisite for assuming the grade of Magister Templi (Master of the Temple) in the A∴A∴. Crowley's interpretation of the Abyss reflects his synthesis of various mystical traditions. He drew upon the teachings of Jewish Kabbalists, Hermeticists, and his own visionary experiences to create a unique understanding of this concept within Thelema.

== Theoretical foundations ==
In this framework, the Abyss represents the profound chasm separating the lower sephiroth from the supernal triad of Kether, Chokmah, and Binah. This divide is symbolized by Da'ath, the hidden sephira, which signifies knowledge and the point of transition between the manifest and the divine.

Crowley's interpretation of the Abyss is influenced by his understanding of Qabalistic teachings and his own mystical experiences. According to Crowley, the Abyss is a realm of chaos and illusion, guarded by the demon Choronzon, who embodies the fragmented nature of the ego. Crossing the Abyss requires the magician to completely annihilate the ego, a process that involves confronting and overcoming Choronzon.

The Abyss is not just a barrier but also a transformative space. It is the threshold that must be crossed to attain higher spiritual states and the grade of Magister Templi in the A∴A∴. This crossing is a critical part of the Thelemic path, representing the destruction of the individual's ego and the attainment of a new level of consciousness. The magician who successfully crosses the Abyss achieves a unity with the divine and gains profound insights into the nature of reality. Crowley wrote, "In Da'ath is all knowledge, and thus is 'the Abyss' created. It is thus the great storehouse of memoranda, of facts and fictions alike."

Crowley's theoretical framework also integrates elements of Hermeticism and Gnosticism. The concept of the Abyss aligns with the Hermetic idea of the separation between the material world and the divine Pleroma, as well as the Gnostic notion of the soul's journey through various planes of existence. This synthesis of different mystical traditions underscores the complexity and depth of Crowley's understanding of the Abyss.

== Symbolism and structure ==
The symbolism and structure of the Abyss in Thelema are rich with esoteric meaning, reflecting both Qabalistic and Thelemic principles. In the Qabalistic Tree of Life, the Abyss is represented by Da'ath, often considered a non-sephira or hidden sephira, which acts as the threshold between the lower sephiroth and the supernal triad. Da'ath symbolizes knowledge, but in the context of the Abyss, it represents the illusory nature of knowledge without the underpinning of spiritual understanding.

The structure of the Abyss within the Thelemic framework is intricately linked to the magician's spiritual journey. The crossing of the Abyss is a crucial initiatory ordeal in the A∴A∴, representing the destruction of the ego and the transition from the individual self to a unified state with the divine. This journey is often depicted as a perilous and transformative process, requiring the magician to confront and overcome the illusions and delusions that Choronzon represents.

In Thelemic symbolism, the Abyss is also related to the concept of Binah, the third sephira on the Tree of Life, which represents understanding and the feminine principle of creation. Crossing the Abyss and attaining Binah is symbolic of achieving a profound level of spiritual insight and unity with the divine mother aspect of the universe.

The relationship between the Abyss and other key Thelemic symbols is also significant. For instance, the Abyss is often contrasted with the "City of the Pyramids", a symbolic realm within the A∴A∴ that represents the state of those who have successfully crossed the Abyss and achieved the grade of Magister Templi. The City of the Pyramids, situated in Binah, symbolizes the stability and unity attained after the chaotic transition through the Abyss.

Crowley's writings, particularly The Vision and the Voice, offer detailed descriptions of the symbolic and structural aspects of the Abyss, providing practical insights and guidance for those undertaking the magical operation of Crossing the Abyss. These works are essential for understanding the complex interplay of symbols and the transformational nature of the Abyss in Thelemic practice.

== Preliminary practices ==
The preliminary practices related to the concept of the Abyss in Thelema involve a series of rigorous spiritual exercises and rituals designed to prepare the magician for the crossing. This preparation is central to the aspirant's progression within the A∴A∴, Crowley's magical order, and represents a transformative journey that demands both psychological and spiritual fortitude.

A typical sequence of preliminary practices often begins with the Lesser Banishing Ritual of the Pentagram (LBRP). This ritual, common to both the Golden Dawn and Crowley's system, establishes a sacred space and aligns the magician with divine forces. Following this, the magician may perform the Greater Ritual of the Hexagram, also shared with the Golden Dawn tradition, which further purifies the magician's consciousness and invokes higher spiritual forces.

Next, the Thelemic magician may engage in the Star Ruby, a ritual created by Crowley specific to Thelema, which serves to banish negative influences and establish control over one's environment. This can be followed by the Star Sapphire, another advanced ritual by Crowley, designed to invoke and align the magician with the divine will.

The Bornless Ritual aims to achieve the Knowledge and Conversation of the Holy Guardian Angel (K&C of the HGA). This is a crucial preparatory step, as the guidance of the HGA is considered essential for navigating the perils of the Abyss. The Abramelin Operation is a well-known example of such a practice, involving months of prayer, purification, and devotion.

Meditation and disciplined mental exercises are also integral to preparing for the Abyss. Techniques such as concentration, visualization, and the invocation of deities help the magician develop the mental clarity and strength needed to withstand the chaotic nature of the Abyss. These practices are outlined in Crowley's works, including Magick (Book 4), and their importance is discussed by scholars such as Richard Kaczynski and Egil Asprem.

In addition to these practices, the aspirant must undergo a period of intense introspection and self-examination. This involves identifying and confronting the deepest fears, desires, and attachments that bind the individual to the material world. By systematically dismantling these egoic structures, the magician prepares for the ultimate surrender required to cross the Abyss.

The progression through these preliminary practices can be a gradual journey spanning years, as the aspirant learns to master the elements and energies of the planets. However, once these skills are mastered, the entire sequence of rituals and practices may also be recapitulated in a single session of magic, allowing for a concentrated and intensive preparation for crossing the Abyss.

== Crossing the Abyss ==
Crossing the Abyss is one of the most profound and challenging experiences in Thelemic practice. This ordeal represents the transition from the individual ego to a state of unity with the divine, a transformative journey that involves the complete annihilation of the self as it is known.

=== Encounter with Choronzon ===
The crux of the ordeal involves confronting Choronzon, the demon of dispersion, who represents the chaotic and fragmented nature of the ego. In The Vision and the Voice, Crowley details his own encounter with Choronzon during his exploration of the Enochian Aethyrs. This confrontation is a symbolic battle where the magician must overcome the illusions and delusions of the ego to achieve a higher state of consciousness. Crowley writes, "Then will all phenomena which present themselves to him appear meaningless and disconnected, and his own Ego will break up into a series of impressions having no relation one with the other, or with any other thing."

=== Annihilation ===
Crossing the Abyss requires the magician to undergo a process of ego annihilation. This involves confronting and dismantling the deepest fears, desires, and attachments that bind the individual to the material world. The goal is to reach a state of emptiness and surrender, where the ego is completely dissolved, allowing the magician to unite with the divine. Crowley described this state as "a momentary unity capable of sensation and of expression" highlighting the fleeting and unstable nature of the ego as it approaches annihilation. This process is often accompanied by intense psychological and spiritual challenges, making it one of the most arduous parts of the Thelemic path.

Crowley often referred to this process using the term Shivadarshana, a concept derived from Hindu philosophy, signifying the vision of Shiva, or the experience of ultimate reality and destruction of the ego. Crowley discusses Shivadarshana most extensively in his Confessions and in Little Essays Toward Truth, where he equates the annihilation of the ego with achieving a higher state of spiritual awareness.

=== Integration and union ===
After successfully crossing the Abyss, the magician attains the grade of Magister Templi and resides in the City of the Pyramids within Binah, the third sephira on the Tree of Life. In this exalted state, the magician achieves a profound union with the divine and integrates the lessons learned during the crossing. This union is symbolized by the complete harmony between the individual's will and the universal divine will.

== Relation to Babalon ==
The relationship between the Abyss and Babalon is a central theme in Thelemic mysticism. Babalon, often referred to as the Scarlet Woman, the Great Mother, or the Mother of Abominations, symbolizes the divine feminine, sexual freedom, and spiritual liberation. She plays a crucial role in the process of crossing the Abyss, embodying the principles of love, desire, and the primal creative force.

Babalon is frequently depicted as a powerful and liberated woman, sitting atop the Beast and holding a cup filled with the blood of saints. This imagery signifies her transformative and consuming nature, which purifies and elevates the magician. The cup, also known as the Graal or the Cup of Babalon, contains the blood of saints, representing the sacrifices and spiritual attainments of those who have traversed the Abyss. Drinking from this cup symbolizes the acceptance of all experiences and the dissolution of the ego, allowing the magician to be reborn into a higher state of consciousness.

In crossing the Abyss, Babalon serves as both a guide and a challenge. The aspirant must surrender to Babalon, symbolizing the complete annihilation of the ego and the acceptance of all experiences without judgment. This surrender is essential for achieving the grade of Magister Templi in the A∴A∴. Crowley describes this process in The Vision and the Voice where the aspirant's encounter with Babalon and the necessity of surrendering to her power is detailed as a crucial part of achieving spiritual union and transcendence.

Upon successfully crossing the Abyss, the magician enters the symbolic realm known as the City of the Pyramids, located in Binah, the third sephira on the Tree of Life. Here, the magician becomes one with the consciousness of the great masters who have come before. Babalon is seen as the gatekeeper to this realm, and her acceptance of the aspirant signifies their successful transformation and integration into the divine.

The influence of Babalon's archetype extends into modern Thelemic practices, exemplified by the Babalon Working, a series of rituals performed in the mid-20th century by Jack Parsons, a follower of Crowley, and L. Ron Hubbard. These rituals aimed to invoke Babalon to manifest her in physical form, reflecting Parsons' intent to bring about a new era and embody the qualities of Babalon.

== Spiritual and psychological implications ==
Crossing the Abyss is a deeply spiritual process that requires the aspirant to confront and transcend their ego. This journey is seen as a necessary step toward achieving the grade of Magister Templi in the A∴A∴, where the magician attains a state of unity with the divine. The surrender to Babalon and the encounter with Choronzon symbolize the ultimate test of faith and will, leading to a profound spiritual rebirth. The spiritual transformation involves a complete reorientation of the magician's consciousness, aligning it with the divine will and the higher self.

The experience of the Abyss is often described as a form of spiritual alchemy, where the aspirant undergoes a transformation akin to the purification of base metals into gold. This metaphor highlights the process of refining the self, stripping away the illusions and attachments that bind the magician to the material world, and emerging as a more enlightened and unified being.

The psychological journey through the Abyss involves facing the darkest aspects of the self. The confrontation with Choronzon, the demon of dispersion, represents the encounter with the fragmented and chaotic nature of the unconscious mind. This ordeal can be seen as a form of shadow work, where the magician must integrate repressed and denied parts of their psyche to achieve wholeness. The dissolution of the ego is a central theme in the psychological experience of the Abyss. This process, often described in terms of ego death, involves a complete breakdown of the individual's sense of self. Crowley described this state as "a momentary unity capable of sensation and of expression", highlighting the transient and unstable nature of the ego as it approaches annihilation.

The transformative potential of this experience is significant. By facing and overcoming the illusions of the ego, the magician gains a deeper understanding of their true nature and the nature of reality. This process leads to greater self-awareness, inner peace, and alignment with the divine will, marking a profound shift in the individual's spiritual and psychological development.

According to Grant Morrison in the Richard Metzger Book of Lies, Choronzon

is Existential Self at the last gasp...Beyond Choronzon we are no longer our Self. The "personality" on the brink of the Abyss will do anything, say anything and find any excuse to avoid taking this disintegrating step into "non-being."

== Literature ==
The concept of the Abyss in Thelema has been extensively discussed and analyzed in both foundational Thelemic texts and modern interpretations. These texts provide a comprehensive understanding of the Abyss, its symbolic significance, and its role in Thelemic practice.

=== Foundational texts ===
Aleister Crowley's writings are the primary sources for understanding the Abyss in Thelemic thought. Key texts include:

- The Vision and the Voice: This work documents Crowley's exploration of the Enochian Aethyrs and his encounter with Choronzon, offering a detailed account of the symbolic and practical aspects of the Abyss.
- Little Essays Toward Truth: Crowley discusses the Abyss in relation to Da'ath and the broader Qabalistic framework, highlighting its role as a critical threshold in the spiritual journey.
- Magick (Book 4): Provides practical instructions and insights into the rituals and exercises designed to prepare the magician for crossing the Abyss.
- The Confessions of Aleister Crowley: Crowley's autobiography offers personal reflections on his mystical experiences and the development of his understanding of the Abyss.
- The Book of Lies: Written specifically for the "Babes of the Abyss", Crowley describes this 1913 volume as an official publication for those who are preparing to cross the Abyss. This work is significant for its intended audience and the insights it provides into the preparatory stages for crossing the Abyss.

=== Interpretations and analysis ===
Several writers have analyzed and interpreted the Abyss from various angles:

- Kenneth Grant in The Magical Revival delves into the esoteric dimensions of the Abyss, exploring its connections to the darker aspects of the human psyche and its role in spiritual alchemy. In his Typhonian Order, he presents the exploration of the "Nightside" of the Tree of Life, including the Qlippoth, as a method useful in crossing the Abyss. He emphasizes that confronting and integrating the dark, chaotic forces represented by the Qlippoth is essential for spiritual transformation. This process, involving the Tunnels of Set, aids in navigating the shadow aspects of the self and achieving profound spiritual insights necessary for crossing the Abyss.
- Egil Asprem in Arguing with Angels: Enochian Magic and Modern Occulture examines the interplay between Enochian magic and the concept of the Abyss, highlighting its significance in contemporary esoteric traditions.
- Tobias Churton in Aleister Crowley: The Biography discusses the Abyss as a crucial part of the spiritual journey, emphasizing its transformative power.
- Richard Kaczynski in Perdurabo: The Life of Aleister Crowley traces the historical development of Crowley's concept of the Abyss and situates it within the broader context of Western esotericism.
- J. Daniel Gunther in The Angel and the Abyss: The Inward Journey explores the psychological transformation involved in crossing the Abyss, comparing it to modern psychological theories.

== See also ==
- Aleister Crowley bibliography
- Abyss – Biblical mythologic bottomless pit
- Abzu – Primeval sea in Mesopotamian mythology
- Dzogchen – Tradition of teachings in Indo-Tibetan Buddhism
- Magical formula – Words expressing a process in ceremonial magic
- Night of Pan – Mystical state in Thelema
- Nu – Ancient Egyptian personification of the primordial watery abyss
- Rigpa – Concept within Tibetan Buddhism
- Tögal – Dzogchen visual meditation practice
- Trekchö – Dzogchen "cutting through" practice
