= Great Work (Thelema) =

Concept within the system of Thelema

Within Thelema, the Great Work is the spiritual endeavor aimed at realizing one's True Will and achieving a profound mystical union with Nuit, the Thelemic personification of the ultimate reality. This path, crafted by Aleister Crowley, draws inspiration from Hermetic alchemy and the Hermetic Qabalah. The cornerstone of Thelema is the Book of the Law, received by Crowley in 1904 through a communication with the entity Aiwass. This text became the central scripture, heralding a new Aeon for humanity and outlining the principles of Thelema.

The core purpose of Thelema is twofold: to discover one's unique True Will, or life's purpose, and to attain mystical union with Nuit. Crowley described the Great Work as the unification of opposing forces, be it the individual with the universal or the ego with the non-ego. The techniques to achieve these goals are collectively termed "Magick", encompassing Western ceremonial magic, meditation, Hermetic Qabalah, tarot, and yoga. In Thelema, these practices are dedicated to the worship of Nuit, the goddess of Stars and Space.

In the framework of Thelema's magical Order A∴A∴, the Great Work of the Probationer Grade involves self-knowledge, understanding the nature and powers of one's own being. Yet, Crowley emphasized that the Great Work is not confined to specific milestones; it is a continuous process. Achieving the Great Work necessitates extensive preparation, including comprehensive knowledge of the Hermetic Qabalah, disciplined meditation, and invoking spiritual entities. The pinnacle of this path lies in the discovery and manifestation of one's True Will, as expressed in the Benediction of Crowley's Gnostic Mass.

== True Will and Union ==
Thelema is a path intended to do two interrelated things: to enable one to learn one's True Will; and to achieve union with Nuit, the Thelemic personification of the infinite and boundless expanse of the universe. This unification of opposites, the individual and the universal, is reiterated by Crowley in his book Magick Without Tears:

The Great Work is the uniting of opposites. It may mean the uniting of the soul with God, of the microcosm with the macrocosm, of the female with the male, of the ego with the non-ego.

The techniques for accomplishing these goals Crowley called Magick, a word he used to describe Western ceremonial magic (especially invocations and eucharistic ceremonies) supported by Buddhist meditation, Hermetic Qabalah, English Qaballa, (Note: Crowley developed Liber Trigrammaton with the intention of using it for Qabalistic purposes, but he found the results unsatisfactory and did not further pursue this application. While some interpretations of The Book of the Law suggest the prediction of an English Qaballa, this system was developed after Crowley's time and was not part of his original teachings.) tarot, and yoga, all set in the context of the worship of Nuit, the goddess of "Infinite Stars and Infinite Space".

Within the system of the magical Order A∴A∴, the Great Work of the Probationer Grade is considered to be the pursuit of self-knowledge to, as Crowley said in The Confessions of Aleister Crowley, "obtain the knowledge of the nature and powers of my own being." However, Crowley continues, the Great Work should also be something that is integrated into the daily life of all. (Note: Crowley (1979), p.: "I insist that in private life men should not admit their passions to be an end, indulging them and so degrading themselves to the level of the other animals, or suppressing them and creating neuroses. I insist that every thought, word and deed should be consciously devoted to the service of the Great Work. 'Whatsoever ye do, whether ye eat or drink, do all to the glory of God.'") Although Crowley often discussed the idea of "succeeding" or "accomplishing" in the Great Work, he also recognized that the process is ongoing. (Note: Crowley (1996), "Man": "The Quest of the Holy Grail, the Search for the Stone of the Philosophers—by whatever name we choose to call the Great Work—is therefore endless. Success only opens up new avenues of brilliant possibility. Yea, verily, and Amen! the task is tireless and its joys without bounds; for the whole Universe, and all that in it is, what is it but the infinite playground of the Crowned and Conquering Child, of the insatiable, the innocent, the ever-rejoicing Heir of Space and Eternity, whose name is MAN?")

The ability to accomplish the Great Work requires a great deal of preparation and effort, according to Crowley's system. The programme consists of several key elements, including a thorough knowledge of the Hermetic Qabalah (especially the Tree of Life), disciplined concentration (i.e. meditation), the development of one's body of light (in order to experience other planes) and the consistent and regular invocation of certain deities or spiritual beings ('assumption of godforms').

Within the mystical and philosophical system developed by Crowley, the core task for a practitioner is the discovery and manifestation of True Will. The realisation of this True Will is itself the Great Work, as expressed in the Benediction at the end of Crowley's Gnostic Mass, where the Priest blesses the congregation with the words:

The LORD bring you to the accomplishment of your true Wills, the Great Work, the Summum Bonum, True Wisdom and Perfect Happiness.

== Methods ==
=== Magick ===
According to Crowley, there is a single definition of the purpose for ritual magick: to achieve Union with God through "the uniting of the Microcosm with the Macrocosm". Since this process is so arduous, it is also acceptable to use magick to develop the self (i.e. one's body of light) or to create ideal circumstances for the Work (e.g. having access to a place in which to do ritual undisturbed). There are many kinds of magick, but the categories of ritual that are recommended by Crowley include banishing unwanted forces, various forms of invocation, and the eucharist, which "consists in taking common things, transmuting them into things divine, and consuming them".

=== Tree of Life ===
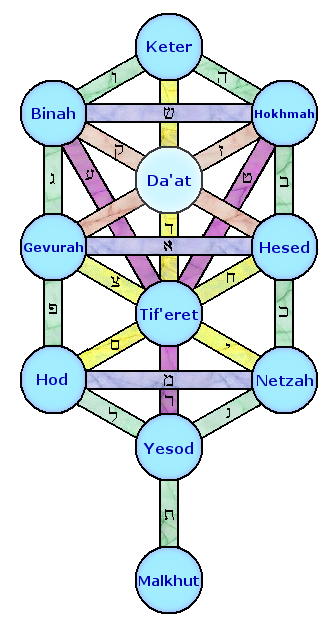
The Sefirot in Kabbalah
The Sefiroth in Jewish Kabbalah
View the image description page for this diagram	The Tree of Life

The path of attainment is largely defined by the Tree of Life. The aspirant begins in Malkuth, which is the everyday material world of phenomena, with the ultimate goal being at Kether, the sphere of Unity with Nuit. Through various exercises and practices, the aspirant attains certain spiritual and mental states that are characterized by the various sephiroth that ascend the Tree. Crowley considered a deep understanding of the Qabalah to be essential to the Thelemite. (Note: Crowley (1973), ch. 4: "The Tree of Life has got to be learnt by heart; you must know it backwards, forwards, sideways, and upside down; it must become the automatic background of all your thinking. You must keep on hanging everything that comes your way upon its proper bough.") (Note: Crowley (1996), "Man": "The whole subject must be studied in the Book 777, and the main attributions committed to memory: then when by constant use the system is at last understood—as opposed to being merely memorised—the student will find fresh light break in on him at every turn as he continues to measure every item of new knowledge that he attains by this Standard. For to him the Universe will then begin to appear as a coherent and a necessary Whole.") The practice of the Middle Pillar is especially important.

The Tree of Life is a tool used to categorize and organize various mystical concepts. At its most simple level it is composed of ten spheres, or emanations, called sephiroth (sing. "sephira") which are connected by twenty-two paths. Each sephira and path is assigned various ideas, such as gods, cards of the Tarot, astrological planets and signs, elements, and so forth. The sephiroth are represented by the planets and the paths by the characters of the Hebrew alphabet, which are subdivided by the five elements, the seven classical planets, and the twelve signs of the Zodiac. Crowley's Liber 777 is one of the most comprehensive collections of such qabalistic correspondences.

=== Concentration ===
Another key element to Thelemic mysticism is the ability to concentrate. This skill has two modalities: the first is the rapid, accurate, and efficient movement of thought (which is the realm of magick) and the other is the stopping of thought altogether (which is accomplished in Yoga). In the first, it is the manipulation of all ideas into one idea, and in the second is the taking of that one thought and reducing it to nothing. (Note: Crowley (1973), ch. 16: "For concentration does indeed unlock all doors; it lies at the heart of every practice as it is of the essence of all theory; and almost all the various rules and regulations are aimed at securing adeptship in this matter. All the subsidiary work—awareness, one-pointedness, mindfulness and the rest—is intended to train you to this.")

Concentration is essentially the prerequisite for all sustained success, not only in spiritual practices, but in day-to-day life as well. The general program for developing concentration is borrowed almost completely from the practice of Yoga within the Hindu and Buddhist systems. Crowley gives a general overview of the techniques in two books: Eight Lectures on Yoga and in the section called "Mysticism" in Magick (Book 4).

=== Body of light ===
Crowley referred to the 'augoeides', a Greek term for the body of light, and connected it with 'the Knowledge & Conversation of the Holy Guardian Angel' associated with each human being. He stressed that the body of light must be built up through the use of imagination, and that it must then be animated, exercised, and disciplined. According to Asprem (2017):

The practice of creating a "body of light” in imagination builds on the body-image system, potentially working with alterations across all of its three modalities (perceptual, conceptual, and affective): an idealized body is produced (body-image model), new conceptual structures are attached to it (e.g., the doctrine of multiple, separable bodies), while emotional attachments of awe, dignity, and fear responses are cultivated through the performance of astral rituals and protections from "astral dangers" through the simulation of symbols and magical weapons.

Crowley explains that the most important practices for developing the Body of Light are:

1. The fortification of the Body of Light by the constant use of rituals, by the assumption of god-forms, and by the right use of the Eucharist. 2. The purification and consecration and exaltation of that Body by the use of rituals of invocation. 3. The education of that Body by experience. It must learn to travel on every plane; to break down every obstacle which may confront it.

According to Crowley, the role of the body of light is broader than simply being a vehicle for astral travel — he writes that it is also the storehouse of all experience. (Note: Crowley (1973), ch. 81: "In Magick, on the contrary, one passes through the veil of the exterior world (which, as in Yoga, but in another sense, becomes "unreal" by comparison as one passes beyond) one creates a subtle body (instrument is a better term) called the body of Light; this one develops and controls; it gains new powers as one progresses, usually by means of what is called "initiation:" finally, one carries on almost one's whole life in this Body of Light, and achieves in its own way the mastery of the Universe.")

The benefit of astral travel is essentially one of education: it is akin to exploring one's own spiritual universe (Note: Crowley (1997), Appendix 3: "Every Magician possesses an Astral Universe peculiar to himself.") and understanding its fundamental components so that the one can eventually master it. The general object is the "control of the Astral Plane, the ability to find one's way about it, to penetrate such sanctuaries as are guarded from the profane, [and] to make such relations with its inhabitants as may avail to acquire knowledge and power, or to command service". Also, "one's apprehension of the Astral Plane must be accurate, for Angels, Archangels, and Gods are derived therefrom by analysis. One must have pure materials if one wishes to brew pure beer".

Crowley believed that what was experienced during "astral travel" was not relevant in terms of what is "real" or "unreal". He thought that the only value to this practice is in the utility it provides to the practitioner. (Note: Crowley (1997), Appendix 3: "The 'reality' or 'objectivity' of these symbols is not pertinent to the discussion. [...] The Magician must not accept [my] account of the Astral Plane, [my] Qabalistic discoveries, [my] instructions in Magick. They may be correct in the main for most men; yet they cannot be wholly true for any save [myself], even as no two artists can make identical pictures of the same subject [...] What one sees and hears is 'real' in its way, whether it be itself, or distorted by one's desires, or created by one's personality [...] The true, the final test, of the Truth of one's visions is their Value. The most glorious experience on the Astral plane, let it dazzle and thrill as it may, is not necessarily in accordance with the True Will of the seer; if not, though it be never so true objectively, it is not true for him, because not useful for him.") He believed that the body of light is more important than simply for astral travel—that it is also the storehouse of all experiences. (Note: Crowley (1973), ch. 81: "In Magick, on the contrary, one passes through the veil of the exterior world (which, as in Yoga, but in another sense, becomes 'unreal' by comparison as one passes beyond) one creates a subtle body (instrument is a better term) called the Body of Light; this one develops and controls; it gains new powers as one progresses, usually by means of what is called 'initiation': finally, one carries on almost one's whole life in this Body of Light, and achieves in its own way the mastery of the Universe.")

=== Numerical methods ===
Numerological methods such as gematria, isopsephy, and English Qaballa are key to understanding Thelemic texts and scriptures, many of which, including The Book of the Law, are written in abstract, poetic, and often cryptic language. Through the use of one or more of these methods, the normally opaque meaning of the texts can be made clear.

=== Magical record ===
A magical record is a journal or other source of documentation containing magical events, experiences, ideas, and any other information that the magician may see fit to add. There can be many purposes for such a record, such as recording evidence to verify the effectiveness of specific procedures (per the scientific method that Aleister Crowley claimed should be applied to the practice of magic) or to ensure that data may propagate beyond the lifetime of the magician. Benefits of this process vary, but usually include future analysis and further education by the individual and/or associates with whom the magician feels comfortable in revealing such intrinsically private information.

Crowley was highly insistent upon the importance of this practice. As he writes in Liber E, "It is absolutely necessary that all experiments should be recorded in detail during, or immediately after, their performance ... The more scientific the record is, the better. Yet the emotions should be noted, as being some of the conditions. Let then the record be written with sincerity and care; thus with practice it will be found more and more to approximate to the ideal." Other items he suggests for inclusion include the physical and mental condition of the experimenter, the time and place, and environmental conditions, including the weather.

== Milestones ==
Crowley often wrote that every practitioners's path will be unique. He also wrote that two major milestones are fundamental to Thelemic mysticism, which he called the knowledge of and conversation with one's Holy Guardian Angel and the crossing of the Abyss. Crowley wrote, "the two crises—the Angel and the Abyss—are necessary features in every career. The other tasks are not always accomplished in [any given order]".

=== Holy Guardian Angel ===
Even though the Holy Guardian Angel (or HGA) is, in a sense, the “higher self”, it is often experienced as a separate being, independent from the experiencer. In the system of the A∴A∴ magical order, the single most important goal is to consciously connect with one's HGA, a process termed “Knowledge and Conversation.” By doing so, a magician becomes fully aware of their own True Will. For Crowley, this event was the single most important goal of any practitioner of magick. (Note: Crowley (1973), ch. 83: "It should never be forgotten for a single moment that the central and essential work of the Magician is the attainment of the Knowledge and Conversation of the Holy Guardian Angel. Once he has achieved this he must of course be left entirely in the hands of that Angel, who can be invariably and inevitably relied upon to lead him to the further great step—crossing of the Abyss and the attainment of the grade of Master of the Temple.")

In most of his writings, Crowley described the Holy Guardian Angel as one's "Silent Self", at times equitable with one's deepest unconscious. In later writings, he insisted that the HGA is an entirely separate and objective being. Whichever position is taken, the object remains the same—to gain an intimate spiritual connection so that one's True Will can become fully known and manifested. When using the Tree of Life as a guide, this event occurs in the Sphere of Tiphareth.

Crowley wrote Liber Samekh as an example of a ritual designed specifically for attaining the Knowledge and Conversation with one's HGA. In his notes to this ritual, Crowley sums up the key to success: “INVOKE OFTEN.” Another detailed description of the general operation is given in The Vision and the Voice, Aethyr 8.

=== Crossing the Abyss ===
After one attains the Knowledge and Conversation of the Holy Guardian Angel, a practitioner may choose to then reach the next major milestone: the crossing of the Abyss, the great gulf or void between the phenomenal world of manifestation and its noumenal source, that great spiritual wilderness which must be crossed by the practitioner to attain mastery. (Note: Crowley (1996), "Man": "This doctrine is extremely difficult to explain; but it corresponds more or less to the gap in thought between the Real, which is Actual, and the Unreal, which is Ideal. In the Abyss all things exist, indeed, at least in posse, but are without any possible meaning; for they lack the substratum of spiritual Reality. They are appearances without Law. They are thus Insane Delusions.")

According to Crowley, Choronzon is the Dweller in the Abyss; he is there as the final obstruction. If he is met with the proper preparation, then he is there to destroy the ego, which allows the practitioner to move beyond the Abyss. If unprepared, then the unfortunate traveller will be utterly dispersed into annihilation. Both Choronzon and the Abyss are discussed in Crowley's Confessions (ch. 66). (Note: Crowley (1979), ch. 66: "The name of the Dweller in the Abyss is Choronzon, but he is not really an individual. The Abyss is empty of being; it is filled with all possible forms, each equally inane, each therefore evil in the only true sense of the word—that is, meaningless but malignant, in so far as it craves to become real. These forms swirl senselessly into haphazard heaps like dust devils, and each such chance aggregation asserts itself to be an individual and shrieks, "I am I!" though aware all the time that its elements have no true bond; so that the slightest disturbance dissipates the delusion just as a horseman, meeting a dust devil, brings it in showers of sand to the earth.")

=== City of the Pyramids and the Night of Pan ===
The City of the Pyramids is the home to those practitioners that have crossed the great Abyss, having spilled all their blood in the Graal of Babalon. They have destroyed their earthly ego-identities, becoming nothing more than piles of dust (i.e. the remaining aspects of their True Selves without the self-sense of "I"). Within, they take on the name or title of Saint or Nemo (Latin for No-Man or No-One). In the system of A∴A∴ they are called Masters of the Temple. It is a step along the path of spiritual purification, and a spiritual resting place for those who have successfully shed their attachments to the mundane world.

The City exists under the Night of Pan, or N.O.X. The playful and lecherous Pan is the Greek god of nature, lust, and the masculine generative power. The Greek word Pan also translates as All, and so he is “a symbol of the Universal, a personification of Nature; both Pangenetor, "all-begetter," and Panphage, "all-devourer". Pan is both the giver and the taker of life, and his Night is that time of symbolic death where the practitioner experiences unification with Nuit through the ecstatic destruction of the ego-self. In a less poetic symbolic sense, this is the state where one transcends all limitations and experiences oneness with the universe.

== See also ==
- Binah – Third emanation in Kabbalah
- Magical formula – Words expressing a process in ceremonial magic
