= Abbey of Thelema =

Building in Cefalù, Italy

Coordinates: 38°01′54″N 14°01′38″E

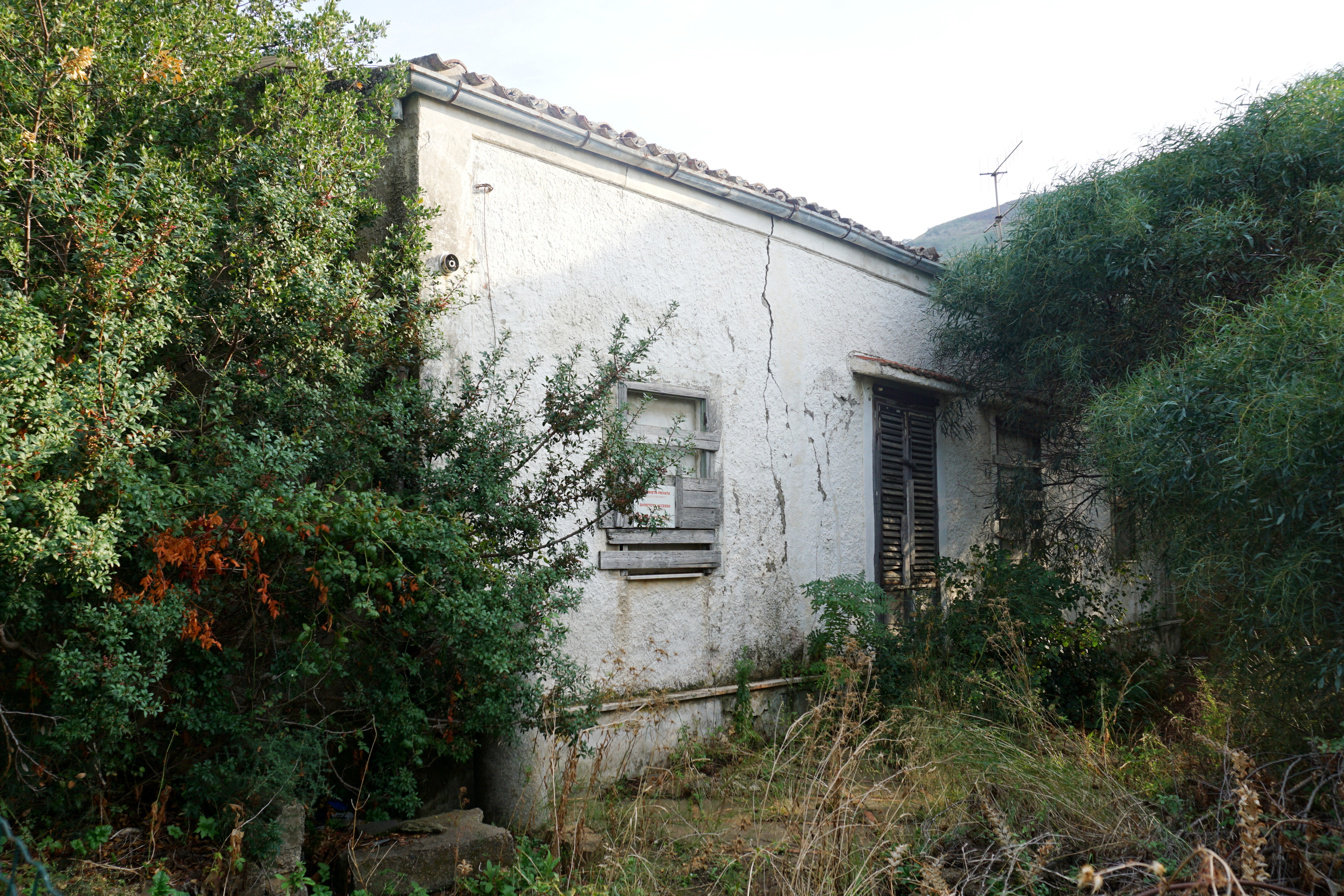
- Abbey of Thelema, 2017
- Interactive map of Abbey of Thelema

Monastery information
- Full name: The Abbey of Thelema in Cefalù
- Order: A∴A∴
- Established: 1920
- Disestablished: 1923 (after 3 years)
- Dedication: Nuit
- Controlled churches: Gnostic Catholic Church

People
- Founder: Aleister Crowley

Site
- Location: Cefalù, Italy
- Visible remains: chapter house, sacristy, parts of the frater and infirmary room
- Public access: free access

The Abbey of Thelema is a small house which was used as a temple and spiritual centre, founded by Aleister Crowley and Leah Hirsig in Cefalù (Sicily, Italy) in 1920.

The villa still stands today, but in poor condition. Filmmaker Kenneth Anger, himself a devotee of Crowley, later uncovered and filmed some of its murals in his film Thelema Abbey (1955), now considered a lost film.

== Name ==
The name was borrowed from François Rabelais's satire, Gargantua and Pantagruel, where an Abbaye de Thélème is described as a sort of "anti-monastery" where the lives of the inhabitants were "spent not in laws, statutes, or rules, but according to their own free will and pleasure." The name "Thelema" is derived from the Greek θέλημα (thélêma), which refers to 'divine will'.

== Objectives ==
The Abbey was to be Crowley's commune, while also being a type of magical school, giving it the designation Collegium ad Spiritum Sanctum (A College towards the Holy Spirit). The general programme was in line with the A∴A∴ course of training, and included daily adorations to the sun, a study of Crowley's writings, regular yogic and ritual practices (which were to be recorded), as well as general domestic labour. The object was for students to devote themselves to the Great Work of discovering and manifesting their True Will.

Crowley had planned to transform the small house into a global centre of magical devotion and perhaps to gain tuition fees paid by acolytes seeking training in the Magical Arts; these fees would further assist him in his efforts to promulgate Thelema and publish his manuscripts.

== Residents ==
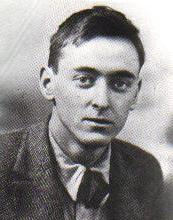
Raoul Loveday, who died at the Abbey in 1923

=== Raoul Loveday ===
In 1923, a 23-year-old Oxford undergraduate, Raoul Loveday (or Frederick Charles Loveday), died at the Abbey. His wife, Betty May, variously blamed the death on his participation in one of Crowley's rituals (allegedly incorporating the consumption of the blood of a sacrificed cat) or the more probable diagnosis of acute enteric fever contracted by drinking from a mountain spring. Crowley had warned the couple against drinking the water, as reported in biographies by Lawrence Sutin and Richard Kaczynski.

When May returned to London, she gave an interview to a tabloid paper, The Sunday Express, which included her story in its ongoing attacks on Crowley. With these and similar rumours about activities at the Abbey in mind, Benito Mussolini's government demanded that Crowley leave the country in 1923. After Crowley's departure, the Abbey of Thelema was eventually abandoned and local residents whitewashed over Crowley's murals.

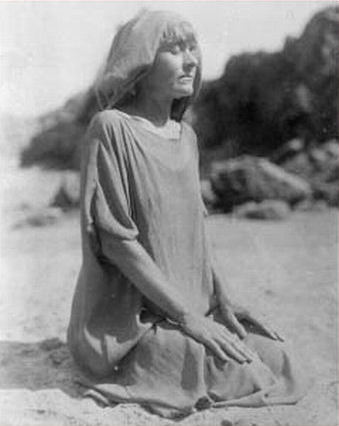
Jane Wolfe meditating on the beach near the Abbey of Thelema

=== Jane Wolfe ===
Jane Wolfe worked with Crowley's Thelemic system of training in Cefalù for three years, and emerged from those years with a degree of attainment, having survived Crowley’s ordeals. Whilst a resident at the Abbey of Thelema, Wolfe was admitted to the A∴A∴ by Crowley, taking the magical name Soror Estai. She undertook various practices including yoga, dhāraṇā and pranayama of which she kept a detailed record which was later published by the College of Thelema of Northern California as The Cefalu Diaries. She later worked as Crowley’s personal representative in London and Paris.

== In popular culture ==
Danish artist Joachim Koester created five colour and five black and white photographs of the villa; these photographs comprise his Morning of the Magicians (2005) work.

== Gallery ==
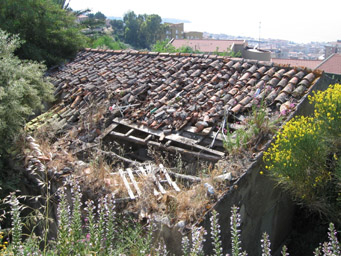
Ruins of the Abbey

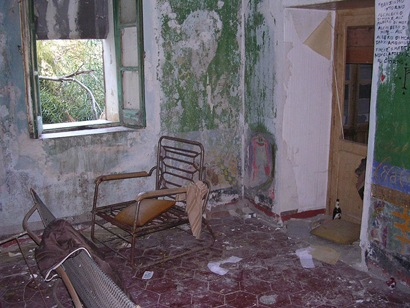
Abbey of Thelema, current rooms

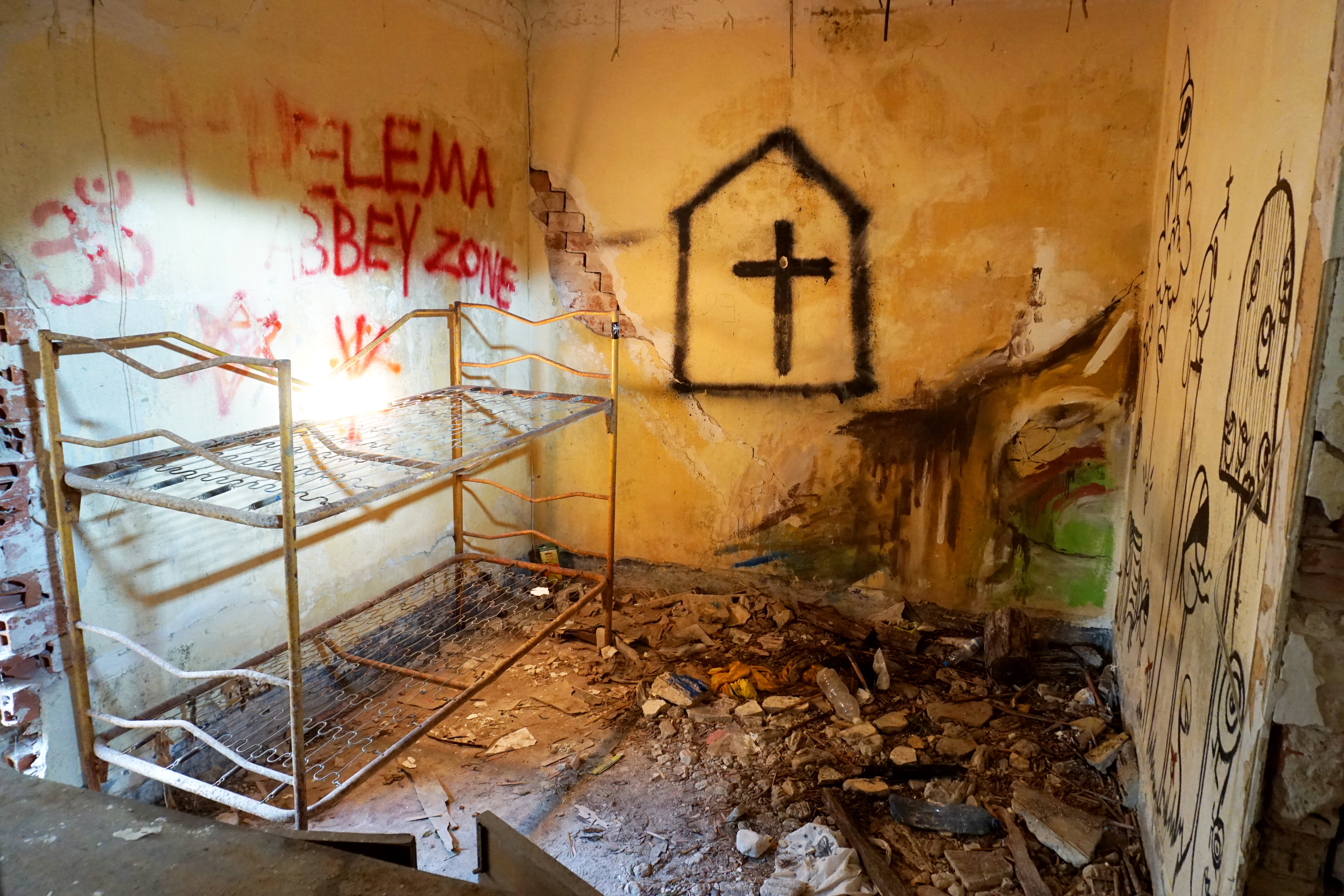
Abbey of Thelema, former typing room

== See also ==
- Agape Lodge
- Liber Resh vel Helios
