= Night of Pan =

Mystical state in Thelema

Within the system of Thelema, the Night of Pan, or N.O.X., is a mystical state that represents the stage of ego death in the process of spiritual attainment.

The playful and lecherous Pan is the Greek god of nature, lust, shepherds, hunters and the masculine generative power. The Greek word Pan also translates as All, and so he is “a symbol of the Universal, a personification of Nature; both Pangenetor, "all-begetter," and Panphage, "all-devourer" Therefore, Pan is both the giver and the taker of life, and his Night is that time of symbolic death where the adept experiences unification with Nuit, the Thelemic personification of the infinite and boundless expanse of the universe, through the ecstatic destruction of the ego-self. In a more general sense, it is the state where one transcends all limitations and experiences oneness with the universe.

== City of the Pyramids ==
In the A∴A∴ system of attainment, after the adept has achieved the Knowledge and Conversation with their Holy Guardian Angel, they then must cross the great Abyss, where they meet Choronzon, who will tempt them to hold on to their subjective self and become trapped in their realm of illusion. To escape the Abyss, the adept gives up their deepest sense of earthly identity, in the symbolic gesture of pouring out their blood into the Cup of Babalon. The adept then becomes as a Babe in the Womb of Babalon—impregnated by Pan—and their lifeless Self becomes as a pile of dust, taking rest in the City of the Pyramids, which lies under the Night of Pan. This is why it is called Night—it represents the lightless Womb, and also the time before the dawning of the new Sun (or rather, the new Self). They then wait in this sublime state until they are ready to move on to the next stage, and become “born” again from the Great Mother of Babalon, begotten by Pan.

== In writings by Crowley ==
Aleister Crowley identifies this process as one of Love. He explains in his 1938 book Little Essays Toward Truth:

The truly magical operations of Love are therefore the Trances, more especially those of Understanding; as will readily have been appreciated by those who have made a careful Qabalistic study of the nature of Binah. For she is omniform as Love and as Death, the Great Sea whence all Life springs, and whose black womb reabsorbs all. She thus resumes in herself the duplex process of the Formula of Love under Will; for is not Pan the All-Begetter in the heart of the Groves at high noon, and is not Her 'hair the trees of Eternity' the filaments of All-Devouring Godhead 'under the Night of Pan?'

It is also described in the mystical text Liber VII:

Ascend in the flame of the pyre, O my soul! Thy God is like the cold emptiness of the utmost heaven, into which thou radiatest thy little light.
When Thou shall know me, O empty God, my flame shall utterly expire in Thy great N. O. X.

Finally, Crowley writes of the Night of Pan in his 1912 or 1913 book The Book of Lies, the first stanza, named "Sabbath of the Goat":

O! the heart of N.O.X. the Night of Pan.
PAN: Duality: Energy: Death.
Death: Begetting: the supporters of O!
To beget is to die; to die is to beget.
Cast the Seed into the Field of Night.
Life and Death are two names of A.
Kill thyself.
Neither of these alone is enough.

In his commentary on this writing, Crowley explains:

It is explained that this triad lives in Night, the Night of Pan, which is mystically called N.O.X., and this O is identified with the O in this word. N is the Tarot symbol, Death; and the X or Cross is the sign of the Phallus. NOX adds to 210, which symbolizes the reduction of duality to unity, and thence to negativity, and is thus a hieroglyph of the Great Work.

The word Pan is then explained, $\Pi$, the letter of Mars, is a hieroglyph of two pillars, and therefore suggest duality; A, by its shape, is the pentagram, energy, and N, by its Tarot attribution, is death. NOX is then further explained, and it is shown that the ultimate Trinity, O!, is supported, or fed, by the process of death and begetting, which are the laws of the universe...It is then asserted that the ultimate letter A has two names, or phases, Life and Death.

== See also ==
- Aleister Crowley bibliography
- Great Work
