= Leah Hirsig =

American occultist

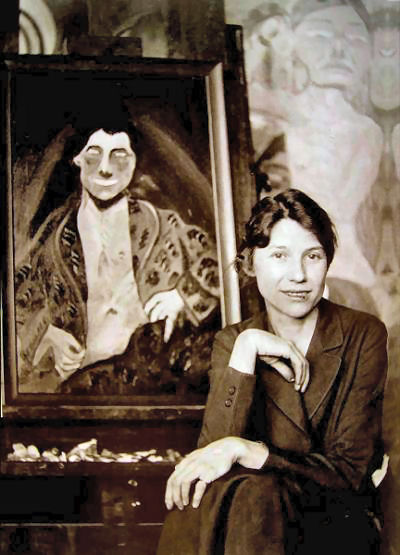
Hirsig as "Alostrael"

Leah Hirsig (April 9, 1883 – February 22, 1975) was an American schoolteacher and occultist, notable for her magical record diary, The Magical Record of the Scarlet Woman, which describes her experiences and visions as an associate and friend of occult writer Aleister Crowley. She was the most famous of Crowley's "Scarlet Women".

== Early life ==
Hirsig was born into a family of nine siblings in Trachselwald, Canton of Bern, Switzerland. However, they moved to the United States when she was a child aged two, and she grew up in New York City. Growing up in the city, she was taught at a high school in the Bronx.

== Interest in occultism ==
Hirsig and her older sister Marian were drawn to the study of the occult, and this interest led them in the spring of 1918 to pay a visit to Aleister Crowley, who was living at the time in the Manhattan neighborhood of Greenwich Village. Crowley and Hirsig felt an immediate and instinctive connection. Leah asked him to paint her as a "dead soul" and in fact Crowley painted several portraits of her.

In 1919, after seeking out Aleister Crowley due to her interest in the occult, she was consecrated as his Babalon or, "Scarlet Woman", taking the name Alostrael, "the womb (or grail) of God." Leah Hirsig wrote in her 1921 diary: "I dedicate myself wholly to The Great Work. I will work for wickedness, I will kill my heart, I will be shameless before all men, I will freely prostitute my body to all creatures".

In 1917 Hirsig gave birth to a first son called Hans Hammond (1917-1985).

== Abbey of Thelema ==
Hirsig helped found the Abbey of Thelema with Crowley in Cefalù, Italy.

Soon after moving from West 9th St. in Greenwich Village New York City with their newborn daughter Anne Leah nicknamed Poupée, Crowley, along with Leah Hirsig, founded the Abbey of Thelema in Cefalù (Palermo), Sicily on 14 April 1920, the day the lease for the villa Santa Barbara was signed by Sir Alastor de Kerval (Crowley) and Contessa Lea Harcourt (Leah Hirsig). The Crowleys arrived in Cefalu on 1 April 1920.[90] During their stay at the abbey, Ms Hirsig was known as Soror Alostrael, Crowley's Scarlet Woman, the name Crowley used for his female sex magic practitioners in reference to the consort of the Beast of the Apocalypse whose number is 666.

Of her time there, Frater Hippokleides (2003) writes:

At the Abbey, Hirsig was instrumental in guiding Crowley, the Prophet of the New Aeon, to a deeper understanding of the Law of Thelema. At a time of despair, Crowley wrote, "What really pulled me from the pit was the courage, wisdom, understanding and divine enlightenment of the Ape herself. Over and over again, she smote into my soul that I must understand the way of the gods ... We must not look to the dead past, or gamble with the unformed future; we must live wholly in the present, wholly absorbed in the Great Work, 'unassuaged of purpose, delivered from the lust of result'. Only so could will be pure and perfect."

Crowley wrote one of his most confronting poems, "Leah Sublime" (which has been called "alarmingly obscene"), in her honour. In Leah, Crowley found an ideal magical partner.

After Raoul Loveday died from drinking contaminated water at Cefalù, Mary Butts reported in one of her journals about Hirsig of an unsuccessful attempt to induce a he-goat to copulate with her at the Abbey of Thelema, emulating an ancient pagan ritual (an account corroborated by Crowley himself in an unpublished passage in one of his diaries).

== After the Abbey ==
With Crowley, Leah had a daughter, whom they named Anna Leah (Poupée) Crowley. She was born on 26 January 1920 in Fontainebleau, France. She died on 15 October 1920.

Hirsig's role as Crowley's initiatrix reached a pinnacle in the spring of 1921 when she presided over his attainment of the grade of Ipsissimus, the only witness to the event.

By June 1924, while Hirsig—the Scarlet Woman—stayed loyal to Crowley during money troubles and painful surgeries for his asthma symptoms, the two of them found their relationship was suffering. She wrote in her diary that his "rasping voice so jarred me that I wanted to scream." After a few months Crowley broke it off, presenting her with a new "Scarlet Woman" by the name of Dorothy Olsen.

But this did not lead Hirsig to abandon her commitment to Thelema. Her diary from this period reveals her continuing devotion to the Great Work, her renewal of her magical oaths, her ongoing invocations of Ra Hoor Khuit, and her consecration of herself as the bride of Chaos. In 1925, when Crowley asked her to serve again for a period as his scribe and secretary, she readily accepted; she was ready to give her assistance when it was necessary to the furtherance of his magical work and to the promulgation of the Law of Thelema. As Crowley wrote in his diary during the Cefalù period, "She loves me for my work ... She knows and loves the God in me, not the man; and therefore she has conquered the great enemy that hides behind his clouds of poisonous gas, Illusion."

== Later life and death ==
Hirsig spent the winter in Paris, France, where her financial problems continued. Crowley biographer Lawrence Sutin rejects the assertion of earlier writers that she worked as a prostitute. She continued to work for Crowley and the promulgation of Thelema for at least three years.

She later had a son by William George Barron called Alexander Barron Hirsig.

On March 13, 1926 her sister Marian Dockerill (born Anna Maria Hirsig), published her exposé on Aleister Crowley, "Oom the Omnipotent" and others in a series of articles which began running on this date in the New York Journal, titled "My Life in a Love Cult, A Warning to All Young Girls". This exposé has been adjudicated, incorrectly, to their other sister Magdalena Alma Hirsig, in the belief that Marian Dockerill was not a real name, but a pseudonym. Research now indicates that the actual author of these articles was the journalist and writer William Seabrook.

Hirsig later rejected Crowley's status as a prophet, while still recognizing the Law of Thelema. Ultimately she returned to her work as a schoolteacher in America. Crowley biographer John Symonds wrote that he had found rumors that she had converted to Roman Catholicism, which could not be verified.

Hirsig never married. She died in 1975 in Meiringen, Switzerland, aged 91.

== The Magical Record of the Scarlet Woman ==
Hirsig is primarily known for her magical record, which has been serialized over four issues of The Scarlet Letter:

- Hirsig, Leah (October 1993) [January 15 - February 17, 1924]. The Magical Record of the Scarlet Woman: Part I. The Scarlet Letter. Scarlet Woman Lodge, Ordo Templi Orientis.
- Hirsig, Leah (August 1994) [June 1 - June 30, 1924]. The Magical Record of the Scarlet Woman: Part II. The Scarlet Letter. Scarlet Woman Lodge, Ordo Templi Orientis.
- Hirsig, Leah (October 1994) [July 1 - December 14, 1924]. The Magical Record of the Scarlet Woman: Part III. The Scarlet Letter. Scarlet Woman Lodge, Ordo Templi Orientis.
- Hirsig, Leah (February 1995) [December 14–29, 1924]. The Magical Record of the Scarlet Woman: Part IV. The Scarlet Letter. Scarlet Woman Lodge, Ordo Templi Orientis.

== See also ==
- Aleister Crowley bibliography
