= Great Work =

Great Work or great work may refer to:

- A masterpiece or magnum opus, a creation that has been given much critical praise
- Magnum opus (alchemy), the process of working with the prima materia to create the philosopher's stone
- Great Work (Hermeticism), also known as magnum opus, a term used in Hermeticism
- Great Work (Thelema), a term used in Thelema

== See also ==
- Magnum opus (disambiguation)
