= Leila Waddell =

Australian musician (1880–1932)

- Waddell performing during the Rites of Eleusis
- Born: Leila Ida Bathurst Waddell; 10 August 1880; Bathurst, New South Wales
- Died: 13 September 1932 (aged 52)

Leila Ida Nerissa Bathurst Waddell (born Leila Ida Bathurst Waddell, 10 August 1880 – 13 September 1932), also known as Laylah, was an Australian violinist who became a Scarlet Woman of Aleister Crowley, and a figure in magick and Thelema in her own right.

== Musician ==
Leila Ida Bathurst Waddell was born in Bathurst, New South Wales, the daughter of Mr. and Mrs. David Waddell. While biographer Toby Creswell posited that Leila was part-Maori, he provides no evidence of this; in fact, New South Wales births, deaths, and marriages records show she was the granddaughter of John Crane (of Coventry, England) and Janet McKenzie (of Fort William, Inverness-shire, Scotland) and John Waddell and Elizabeth McAnally (both of County Monaghan, Ireland).

She began her professional career as a violin teacher at Presbyterian Ladies' College, Croydon, and Ascham and Kambala schools.

In 1908, Waddell was a member of the gypsy band in A Waltz Dream at Daly's London Theatre. It was while in London that she met Aleister Crowley. They studied the occult and took mescaline together.

== Crowley's muse ==
Waddell was familiarly addressed by Crowley as "Laylah", and he immortalised her in his 1913 volume The Book of Lies and his 1929 autobiography The Confessions of Aleister Crowley. Crowley referred to her, variously, as "Divine Whore", "Mother of Heaven", "Sister Cybele", "Scarlet Woman", and "Whore of Babylon". His Book of Lies was largely dedicated to Waddell, with poems like "Duck Billed Platypus" and "Waratah Blossoms". A photograph of her in ritual is reproduced in the volume.

Photo from Aleister Crowley's 1913 The Book of Lies

Waddell herself was an accomplished writer and magician. In October and November 1910, Crowley starred Waddell and other members of his magical order the Argenteum Astrum in his series of dramatic planetary-based magical rites, the Rites of Eleusis, at London's Caxton Hall.

In 1912, Waddell, and fellow Crowley students Mary Desti and Mary Butts, were given co-authorship credit on Crowley's Magick (Book 4) as they wrote down his words, helped shape them by asking defining questions, and elicited Crowley's commentary on pertinent points.

Crowley also starred Waddell, along with other 'fiddlers', in a septette called "The Ragged Ragtime Girls" on the London stage. This vaudeville troupe also toured Europe, the US and Russia, promoted by Crowley.

Laylah was probably Aleister Crowley's most powerful muse, as she inspired numerous poems in addition to numerous chapters in The Book of Lies. Crowley based two of his short stories on Leila – "The Vixen" and "The Violinist".

In 1915, Crowley stood at the base of the Statue of Liberty (formally Liberty Enlightening the World) and declared an Irish Republic in a long and impassioned speech accompanied by Waddell on the violin. The relationship with Crowley disintegrated as a consequence of his infidelities.

== Later life ==
In 1923, Waddell returned to Sydney to nurse her ailing father. She performed with JC Williamson Ltd Orchestra at Her Majesty's Theatre and the Criterion, and with the Conservatorium and Philharmonic Societies Orchestras. In between times she resumed teaching, this time at the Convent School of the Sacred Heart in Sydney's Elizabeth Bay.

She died, unmarried, of cancer at age 52. The Sydney Morning Herald noted: "Besides possessing an excellent technique, Miss Waddell's style as a violinist was particularly marked by charm and refinement."

== See also ==
- Aleister Crowley bibliography
- List of occultists
- Sex magic
