= The Book of Lies (Crowley) =

1913 book by Aleister Crowley

- Author: Aleister Crowley
- Language: English
- Genre: Occult
- Publication date: 1913
- Publication place: United Kingdom
- Media type: Print (Paperback)
- Pages: 200 pp
- ISBN: 0-87728-516-0

Laylah (Leila Waddell) was Aleister Crowley's muse during the writing of The Book of Lies and is referenced many times within it.

The Book of Lies (full title: Which is also Falsely Called BREAKS. The Wanderings or Falsifications of the One Thought of Frater Perdurabo, which Thought is itself Untrue. Liber CCCXXXIII [Book 333]) is a book written by English occultist and teacher Aleister Crowley (using the pen name of Frater Perdurabo) and first published in 1913. As Crowley describes it: "This book deals with many matters on all planes of the very highest importance. It is an official publication for Babes of the Abyss, but is recommended even to beginners as highly suggestive."

The book consists of 93 chapters, each of which consists of one page of text. The chapters include a question mark, an exclamation mark, poems, rituals, instructions, and obscure allusions and cryptograms. The subject of each chapter is generally determined by its number and its corresponding Qabalistic meaning. Around 1921, Crowley wrote a short commentary about each chapter, assisting the reader in the Qabalistic interpretation.

Several chapters and a photograph in the book reference Leila Waddell, whom Crowley called Laylah, and who, as Crowley's influential Scarlet Woman, acted as his muse during the writing process of this volume.

== Details ==
The title page contains the following paraphrase of Alfred, Lord Tennyson:

Break, break, break
At the foot of thy stones, O Sea!
And I would that I could utter
The thoughts that arise in me!

An explanation of the title on the facing page ends with the sentence, "There is no joke or subtle meaning in the publisher's imprint." Yet according to Robert Anton Wilson in his 1977 book Cosmic Trigger I: The Final Secret of the Illuminati:

This might have been a veiled warning about what will follow, but is actually the first lie in the book; occult historian Francis King has carefully determined the date on the imprint is inaccurate by at least a year.

In his Confessions, Crowley discusses how the book was to lead to his joining Ordo Templi Orientis. He wrote each chapter at lunch or dinner "by the aid of Dionysos", with one chapter that was especially troubling. He eventually was able to get it written after much effort, but he remained dissatisfied and angry with it. Not too long after it had been published, he was visited by Theodor Reuss, then head of the order.

[Reuss] said that since I was acquainted with the supreme secret of the Order, I must be allowed the IX° and obligated in regard to it. I protested that I knew no such secret. He said, "But you have printed it in the plainest language." I said that I could not have done so because I did not know it. He went to the bookshelves and, taking out a copy of The Book of Lies, pointed to a passage in the despised chapter. It instantly flashed upon me. The entire symbolism, not only of freemasonry but of many other traditions, blazed upon my spiritual vision. From that moment the O.T.O. assumed its proper importance in my mind. I understood that I held in my hands the key to the future progress of humanity.

Aleister Crowley wrote that this could not have happened the way he remembered it, since The Book of Lies had not yet come out when he joined the O.T.O.

Assuming this event did take place, readers have suggested various possible chapters that might contain the secret. Wilson points to Chapter 69, "The Way to Succeed—and the Way to Suck Eggs!" (sucking seed and sucking eggs referring to mutual oral sex), while Crowley's book De Arte Magica names Chapter 36, "The Star Sapphire", a ritual related chapter.

== Mass of the Phoenix ==
Chapter 44 of the book is a ritual named the Mass of the Phoenix. The ritual has been performed by many practitioners during the years, including Robert Anton Wilson, who describes his experience with it in Cosmic Trigger II: Down to Earth. Within this ritual, the practitioner consumes a Cake of Light (a wafer made from meal, honey, olive oil, oil of Abramelin, and blood, semen, or both).

== Editions ==
- Original limited edition, 1913
- The Hayden Press, Ilfracombe, Devon, 1962. with commentary edited by Mr. Karl Johannes Germer.
- Red Wheel Weiser, June 1970. ISBN 0-87728-018-5
- Weiser Books, reprint edition, June 1986. ISBN 0-87728-516-0

== In popular culture ==
American Industrial metal band Ministry released their 1992 album Psalm 69: The Way to Succeed and the Way to Suck Eggs in 1992.

== See also ==
- Aleister Crowley bibliography
- "The Sect of the Phoenix" – story by Jorge Luis Borges
