= Victor Neuburg (poet) =

English poet (1883–1940)

Victor Neuberg
- Born: Victor Benjamin Neuburg; 6 May 1883; Islington, London, England
- Died: 31 May 1940 (aged 57); London, England
- Education: Trinity College, Cambridge
- Occupations: Poet and writer

Victor Benjamin Neuburg (6 May 1883 – 31 May 1940) was an English poet and writer. An intimate associate of Aleister Crowley, he wrote on the subject of occultism, including Theosophy and Thelema. He edited "The Poet's Corner" column in the Sunday Referee, and also published the early works of Dylan Thomas and Pamela Hansford Johnson.

== Early life ==
Neuburg was born into and raised in an upper-middle-class Jewish family in Islington, London. His father, Carl Neuburg, who had been born in 1857 in Plzeň, Bohemia, and was a commission agent based in Vienna, abandoned the family shortly after his son's birth. Victor was brought up by his mother, Jeanette Neuburg, née Jacobs (1855–1939), and his maternal aunts. He was educated at the City of London School and Trinity College, Cambridge, where he studied medieval and modern languages.

== Relationship with Aleister Crowley ==
When he was 25, in around 1906, Neuburg came in contact with Crowley, also a poet, who had read some of Neuburg's pieces in the Agnostic Journal. Crowley's droll description of him was "an agnostic, a vegetarian, a mystic, a Tolstoyan, and several other things all at once" and described him as "extraordinarily well-read, overflowing with exquisitely subtle humour, and being one of the best natured people that ever trod this planet.

Crowley initiated Neuburg into his magical Order, the A∴A∴, in which he took the magical name "Frater Omnia Vincam". Crowley also began an extended sentimental and sexual relationship with Neuburg. In 1909 Crowley took Neuburg to Algiers, and they set off into the desert, where they performed a series of rituals based on the Enochian system of Doctor John Dee, later chronicled in The Vision and the Voice. In the midst of these rituals Crowley put the ideas of sex and magick together, and performed his first sex magick ritual. Neuburg's anthology of poems The Triumph of Pan (1910) dates from shortly after these events and shows the distinct influence of Crowley:

Sweet Wizard, in whose footsteps I have trod
Unto the shrine of the most obscene god,
So steep the pathway is, I may not know,
Until I reach the summit where I go.

Crowley was highly impressed by Neuburg's poetic ability:

...in the next few years he produced some of the finest poetry of which the English language can boast. He had an extraordinary delicacy of rhythm, an unrivalled sense of perception, a purity and intensity of passion second to none, and a remarkable command of the English language.

Back in London, Neuburg showed potential as a dancer, so Crowley gave him a leading role in his proto-performance art pieces/public magical rituals called the Rites of Eleusis. Neuburg also pursued a doomed relationship with the actress Ione de Forest, who committed suicide a short time after their break-up.

In 1913 Crowley and Neuburg again joined forces in a sex magic operation known as "the Paris Working". According to one of Crowley's biographers, Lawrence Sutin, Crowley subsequently used anti-Semitic epithets to bully Neuburg, and compared Neuburg to a dromedary. This spurred Neuburg to break with Crowley some time in 1914, describing the slurs as "ostrobogulous piffle", inventing the word 'ostrobogulous' for the occasion.

== The Vine Press ==
From 1916 Neuburg served in the British Army. After the end of the First World War he moved to Steyning in Sussex, where he ran a small press, the Vine Press. In 1920 he published a collection of ballads and other verse under the title Lillygay. Many of these were adapted from earlier ballad collections. In 1923 Peter Warlock set five of these verses to music under the same title.

== "The Poet's Corner" and Dylan Thomas ==
From 1933 onwards Neuburg edited a section called "The Poet's Corner" in the British newspaper Sunday Referee. Here he encouraged new talent by awarding weekly prizes of half a guinea for the best poem. One first prize was awarded to the then-unknown Dylan Thomas, and the publisher of the Sunday Referee sponsored Neuburg's publication of Thomas's first book, 18 Poems.

Another poet who contributed to the column was Pamela Hansford Johnson, and for many months, Johnson and Thomas seemed to alternate as winners of first prize. In 1937, Jean Overton Fuller submitted a poem to "The Poets' Corner" and was drawn into Neuburg's circle, eventually becoming his biographer.

== Personal life ==
Neuburg married Kathleen Rose Goddard in 1921, but the marriage eventually broke up. They had a son, Victor Edward Neuburg (1924–1996), who became a writer on English literature.

Neuburg later started a relationship with Runia Tharpe, and moved to Swiss Cottage, London, to live with her.

== Death ==
Neuburg died from tuberculosis on 30 May 1940. Dylan Thomas declared on hearing of Neuburg's death:

Vicky encouraged me as no one else has done ... He possessed many kinds of genius, and not the least was his genius for drawing to himself, by his wisdom, graveness, great humour and innocence, a feeling of trust and love that won’t ever be forgotten.

== Selected publications ==
- The Green Garland (1908)
- The Triumph of Pan (1910)
- Lillygay: An Anthology of Anonymous Poems (1920)
- Swift Wings: Songs in Sussex (1921)
- Songs of the Groves (1921)
- Larkspur: A Lyric Garland (1922)

== See also ==
- Choronzon
- Vittoria Cremers
