= The Vision and the Voice =

Book by Aleister Crowley

The Vision and the Voice, or Liber 418
- Cover of the 1999 edition of The Vision and the Voice
- Author: Aleister Crowley
- Language: English
- Series: The Equinox
- Release number: I (5)
- Subject: Enochian magic
- Publisher: Privately printed
- Publication date: 1911
- Publication place: United Kingdom

The Vision and the Voice (Liber 418) is a book by Aleister Crowley (1875–1947). It chronicles the mystical journey of the author as he explored the 30 Enochian aethyrs originally developed by John Dee and Edward Kelley in the 16th century. These visions took place at two times: in 1900 during his stay in Mexico, and later in 1909 in Algeria in the company of poet Victor Benjamin Neuburg. Of all his works, Crowley considered this book to be second in importance behind The Book of the Law, the text that established his religious and philosophical system of Thelema in 1904. It was first published in 1911 in The Equinox (Volume I, Number 5) as a "Special Supplement".

The Vision and the Voice is the source of many of the central spiritual doctrines of Thelema, especially in the visions of Babalon and her consort Chaos (the "All-Father"), as well as an account of how an individual might cross the Abyss, thereby assuming the title of "Master of the Temple" and taking a place in the City of the Pyramids under the Night of Pan.

The source manuscript (in five numbered notebooks) can be viewed at Harry Ransom Center collection in Austin, Texas.

== Editions ==
- Crowley, Aleister (Spring 1911). "Liber CCCCXVIII (XXX Aerum) vel Saecvli sub figura CCCCXVIII, Being of the Angels of the 30 Aethyrs, the Vision and the Voice". The Equinox (Special Supplement). I (5). London: Privately printed.
- Crowley, Aleister (1952). Germer, Karl J. (ed.). The Vision and the Voice (1st ed.). Barstow, California: Thelema Publishing Company. With an introduction by Israel Regardie.
- Crowley, Aleister (1972). Regardie, Israel (ed.). The Vision and the Voice. Sangreal Foundation. ISBN 0-87913-001-6.
- Crowley, Aleister (1980) [1952]. Germer, Karl (ed.). The Vision and the Voice (Helen Parsons-Smith ed.). Barstow, California: Thelema Publishing Company. Second issue of Germer's 1952 edition.
- Crowley, Aleister; Neuburg, Victor B.; Desti, Mary (1998). The Vision & The Voice with Commentary and Other Papers. Weiser Books. ISBN 978-0-87728-887-9.
