= Choronzon =

Demon or devil

Choronzon /ˌkoʊˌroʊnˈzoʊn/ is a demon that originated in writing with the 16th-century occultists Edward Kelley and John Dee within the latter's occult system of Enochian magic. In the 20th century he became an important element within the mystical system of Thelema, founded by Aleister Crowley, where he is the "dweller in the abyss", believed to be the last great obstacle between the adept and enlightenment. Thelemites believe that if he is met with proper preparation, then his function is to destroy the ego (causing ego death), which allows the adept to move beyond the abyss of occult cosmology.

== Spelling variations ==
Including Crowley's spelling of the name, Choronzon, there appear to be three alternatives. Meric Casaubon states that the name is Coronzon (without an 'h') in his True and Faithful Relation. However, this is at variance with the spelling that appears in John Dee's own journals. Laycock's Enochian Dictionary gives the latter spelling as Coronzom, citing an original manuscript (Cotton XLVI Pt. I, fol. 91a) as the source for the variant.

== View of Aleister Crowley ==
Otherwise known as "the demon of dispersion", Choronzon is described by Crowley as a temporary personification of the raving and inconsistent forces that occupy the abyss. In this system, Choronzon is given form in evocation only so it may be mastered.

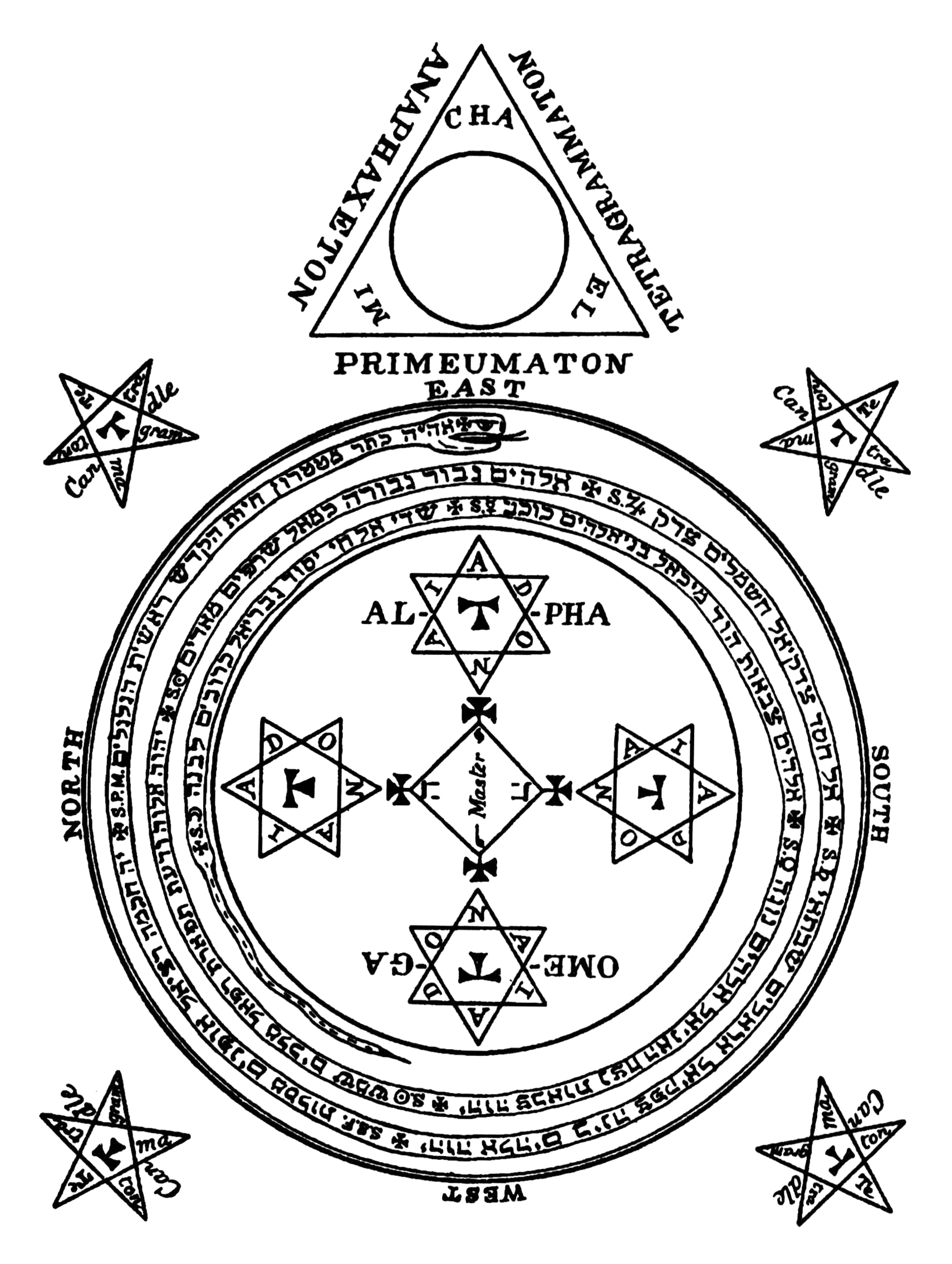
Outline of the setup described in The Lesser Key of Solomon, with the "Solomonic triangle" at the top.

Crowley states that he and Victor Benjamin Neuburg evoked Choronzon in Bou Saâda, Algeria in December 1909. In Crowley's account, it is unclear whether Choronzon was evoked into an empty Solomonic triangle while Crowley sat elsewhere, or whether Crowley himself was the medium into which the demon was invoked. Nearly all writers except Lawrence Sutin take him to mean the latter. In the account, Choronzon is described as changing shape, which is read variably as an account of an actual metamorphosis, a subjective impression of Neuburg's, or fabrication on Crowley's part.

The account describes the demon throwing sand over the triangle to breach it, following which it attacked Neuburg 'in the form of a naked savage', forcing him to drive it back at the point of a dagger. Crowley's account has been criticized as unreliable, as the relevant original pages are torn from the notebook in which the account was written. This, along with other inconsistencies in the manuscript, has led to speculation that Crowley embroidered the event to support his own belief system. Crowley wrote, in a footnote to the account in Liber 418, that "(t)he greatest precautions were taken at the time, and have since been yet further fortified, to keep silence concerning the rite of evocation."

Arthur Calder-Marshall states in The Magic of my Youth that Neuburg gave a quite different account of the event, recounting that he and Crowley evoked the spirit of "a foreman builder from Ur of the Chaldees", who chose to call himself "P.472". The conversation begins when two British students ask Neuburg about a version of the story in which Crowley turned him into a zebra and sold him to a zoo. Neuburg's response in this book contradicts both the words attributed to him in Liber 418 and the statement of Crowley biographer Lawrence Sutin.

Choronzon is deemed to be held in check by the power of the goddess Babalon, inhabitant of Binah, the third sephirah of the Tree of Life. Both Choronzon and the abyss are discussed in Crowley's Confessions:

The name of the Dweller in the Abyss is Choronzon, but he is not really an individual. The Abyss is empty of being; it is filled with all possible forms, each equally inane, each therefore evil in the only true sense of the word—that is, meaningless but malignant, in so far as it craves to become real. These forms swirl senselessly into haphazard heaps like dust devils, and each such chance aggregation asserts itself to be an individual and shrieks, "I am I!" though aware all the time that its elements have no true bond; so that the slightest disturbance dissipates the delusion just as a horseman, meeting a dust devil, brings it in showers of sand to the earth.

C. F. Russell, one of Crowley's disciples, went on to found the Choronzon Club, later renamed the GBG.

== In popular culture ==
An invocation of Choronzon forms the basis for a 1980 episode of Hammer House of Horror entitled "Guardian of the Abyss", in which a cult called The Choronzon Society uses John Dee's scrying mirror to conjure Choronzon.

Choronzon appears in issue #4 of Neil Gaiman's Sandman series as a demon in hell.

Chronozon is an NPC in the online game Old School Runescape.

Chronozon appears under the name of Chorozo as the companion of Aleister Crowley in the Yu-Gi-Oh! OCG Stories manga's Magistus arc, which is thematically based on Thelema.

== See also ==
- Aleister Crowley bibliography
