= Magick (Book 4) =

Book by Aleister Crowley

Cover of Magick, Liber ABA, Book 4 by Aleister Crowley

Magick, Liber ABA, Book 4 is a book by 20th-century occultist Aleister Crowley with Mary Desti and Leila Waddell. It is widely considered to be Crowley's magnum opus.

Magick is a lengthy treatise on ceremonial magic (which he anachronistically refers to as 'magick', to distinguish it from stage magic), synthesised from many sources including yoga, Hermeticism, medieval grimoires, contemporary magical theories from writers like Eliphas Levi and Helena Blavatsky, and his own original contributions. It consists of four parts: Mysticism, Magick (Elementary Theory), Magick in Theory and Practice, and ΘΕΛΗΜΑ—the Law (The Equinox of The Gods). It also includes numerous appendices presenting many rituals and explicatory papers.

Liber ABA refers to this work being a part of Crowley's system of magical works known as libri (Latin for 'books'). In most systems such as gematria where letters are given numerical value, ABA adds up to 4, a number which represents the Four Elements, Stability and so on (thus the name Book 4).

== Background ==
In November 1911, Aleister Crowley conducted a ritual during which he reported being commanded to write Book 4 by a discarnate entity named "Abuldiz", who appeared in the visions of Crowley's seer, Soror Virakam (Mary Desti). This event occurred around the time that The Book of the Law (Liber Legis) was about to be published in The Equinox, Vol. I, No. VII. The writing of Book 4 was accomplished with the assistance of Soror Virakam at a villa in Posillipo near Naples, Italy. The book was subsequently published in the winter of 1912–1913 in The Equinox, Vol. I, No. VIII.

Much of Book 4 was dictated by Crowley to his principal A∴A∴ students, who also asked questions for clarification. The principal collaborators were Soror Virakam (Mary Desti), Leila Waddell (also known as Laylah and Soror Agatha), and Soror Rhodon (Mary Butts), all of whom were given co-authorship credit. The book was also dedicated to Soror Ouarda (Rose Edith Crowley), Frater Per Ardua (Maj.-Gen. John Frederick Charles Fuller); Soror Alostrael (Leah Hirsig) and Frater Volo Intelligere (Gerald Yorke).

The creation of Magick (Book 4) was part of Crowley's broader effort to systematize and articulate the principles of Thelema, the spiritual philosophy he founded. The work synthesizes elements from a wide array of mystical and magical traditions, including yoga, Hermeticism, and medieval grimoires, alongside Crowley's original contributions. This synthesis aimed to provide a comprehensive guide to both the theoretical and practical aspects of magick as understood within the Thelemic framework.

Crowley's intention was to demystify the practice of magick, making it more accessible to serious students of the occult. He emphasized that magick should be approached with the same rigor and precision as scientific inquiry, coining the famous phrase: "Magick is the Science and Art of causing Change to occur in conformity with Will." This pragmatic approach is evident throughout the book, where Crowley meticulously outlines various magical techniques and practices, from basic yoga postures to complex ceremonial rituals.

The book is divided into four parts: Mysticism, Magick (Elementary Theory), Magick in Theory and Practice, and ΘΕΛΗΜΑ—the Law. Each section addresses different aspects of Crowley's system, providing a structured path for practitioners to follow. The appendices further supplement the main text with practical essays on magical practices, key correspondences from Crowley's Liber 777, and other essential teachings of Thelema.

== Contents ==
=== Part I: Mysticism ===
Part I is titled "Mysticism" with the sub-title "Meditation: The way of attainment of genius or Godhead considered as a development of the human brain." The section is essentially Crowley's system of yoga, which is designed to still the mind and enable single-pointed concentration. When developing his basic yogic program, Crowley borrowed heavily from many other yogis, such as Patanjali and Yajnavalkya, keeping their fundamental techniques while jettisoning much of the attendant moral dogma.

Yoga, as Crowley interprets it in this section, involves several key components. The first is asana, which is the assumption (after eventual success) of any easy, steady and comfortable posture. Next is pranayama, which is the control of breath, and mantra yoga, which is the use of mantras. Yama and niyama are the adopted moral or behavioural codes (of the adept's choosing) that will be least likely to excite the mind. Pratyahara is the stilling of the thoughts so that the mind becomes quiet. Dharana is the beginning of concentration, usually on a single shape, like a triangle, which eventually leads to dhyana, the loss of distinction between object and subject, which can be described as the annihilation of the ego (or sense of a separate self). The final stage is samādhi—union with the All.

=== Part II: Magick (Elementary Theory) ===
Part II, "Magick (Elemental Theory)", deals with the accessories of ceremonial magick in detail. Subjects include: the temple, the magick circle, the altar, the scourge, dagger, and chain, the holy oil, the wand, cup, sword, pentacle, lamp, crown, robe, book, bell, lamen, and the Magick Fire (including the crucible and incense). This section also includes an "Interlude", which is a humorous exposition on the magical interpretations of popular nursery rhymes, such as Old Mother Hubbard and Little Bo Peep.

=== Part III: Magick in Theory and Practice ===
Part III is titled "Magick in Theory and Practice", and is perhaps the most influential section within Book 4. In this part, magick (with the terminal -k) is defined in Crowley's now famous "Introduction", which is the source of many well-known statements, such as

- "Magick is the Science and Art of causing Change to occur in conformity with Will."
- "Every intentional act is a Magical Act."
- "Magick is the Science of understanding oneself and one's conditions. It is the Art of applying that understanding in action."
- "Magick is merely to be and to do."

It contains many influential essays on various magical formulae, such as Tetragrammaton, Thelema, agape, AUMGN, and IAO. The section also addresses fundamental magical theorems, essential components of ritual, and general practices (e.g. banishing, consecration, invocation, and divination).

=== Part IV: ΘΕΛΗΜΑ—the Law ===
Part IV is titled "ΘΕΛΗΜΑ (Thelema)—the Law." This section deals with The Book of the Law, including the book itself, a brief biography of Crowley, the events leading up to its reception, and the conditions of the three days of its writing. This part is Crowley's 1936 book The Equinox of the Gods only edited under a different name.

=== Appendices ===
The appendices include many rituals and practical essays on magical practice. The most recent volume includes a reading list, One Star in Sight (which lays out the program of his teaching order A∴A∴), an essay on the astral plane, some key correspondences from Liber 777 (his work on the tree of life), many of the basic rituals of A∴A∴, and another exposition on the reception of The Book of the Law (Liber Legis).

== Editions ==
- Crowley, Aleister (1988). Symonds, John; Grant, Kenneth (eds.). Magick. London: Guild Publishing.
- Crowley, Aleister; Desti, Mary; Waddell, Leila (1997). Hymenaeus Beta (ed.). Magick: Liber ABA (Book 4 · Parts 1-4). Red Wheel/Weiser. ISBN 978-0-87728-919-7.

== See also ==
- Aleister Crowley bibliography
- Books about magic
- List of occult terms
