= Liber Resh vel Helios =

Set of daily solar adorations

Liber Resh vel Helios, commonly referred to as Liber Resh, is a set of daily solar adorations composed by Aleister Crowley, the founder of the religion of Thelema. The practice involves a series of invocations to the Sun at specific times of the day: dawn, noon, sunset, and midnight. These rituals are intended to align the practitioner with the natural cycles of the Sun, thus integrating the physical and spiritual dimensions of existence in accordance with Thelemic principles.

The structure of Liber Resh consists of four adorations, each corresponding to a different position of the Sun in the sky. Practitioners perform these rituals facing the appropriate cardinal direction: east at dawn, south at noon, west at sunset, and north at midnight. This practice is not only a means of attuning oneself to the cosmic order but also serves as a daily reminder of the Thelemic axiom, "Do what thou wilt shall be the whole of the Law."

In Thelema, the practice of Liber Resh is also closely tied to the Thelemic method of recording dates, which incorporates the formulae of the years of the Aeon of Horus. Practitioners often use the dates and times of these solar adorations as timestamps in their magical diaries to meticulously track their spiritual progress and experiences, marking off the degrees of progress through the zodiac. The zodiac, an attribute of Chokmah (Wisdom), symbolizes the practitioner's alignment with cosmic wisdom and order. This integration of ritual practice and record-keeping exemplifies the disciplined approach to spiritual development advocated by Crowley.

== Background ==
Liber Resh was first published in 1911 in the first volume of The Equinox issue Number VI, a biannual journal that served as the official publication of the A∴A∴, an occult organization he founded. The ritual was designed to align practitioners with the solar cycle, symbolizing the integration of cosmic and personal spiritual energies.

The composition of "Liber Resh" was influenced by Crowley's deep interest in ancient Egyptian mythology and cosmology. This structure draws on Crowley's extensive knowledge of ancient Egyptian deities and their symbolic meanings, aiming to connect the practitioner with these ancient archetypes.

The publication and dissemination of "Liber Resh" marked a significant moment in the establishment of Thelemic practice. By prescribing specific times and forms of daily worship, Crowley sought to instill a sense of discipline and regularity in the spiritual lives of his followers. This daily ritual was intended to serve as a constant reminder of the central Thelemic tenet, "Do what thou wilt shall be the whole of the Law".

== Ritual structure, symbolism, and practice ==
Liber Resh vel Helios consists of four daily solar adorations designed to align practitioners with the natural solar cycle, integrating physical and spiritual dimensions in accordance with Thelemic principles. Each adoration is performed at a specific time of the day: dawn, noon, sunset, and midnight, corresponding to different aspects of the Sun and associated Egyptian deities. These rituals serve to foster a disciplined spiritual practice and harmonize the practitioner's energies with the cosmic forces represented by the Sun.

Each adoration includes specific words and gestures, followed by the sign of silence and a period of meditation. Practitioners may assume the god-form of the deity being invoked, further enhancing their connection to the cosmic forces represented by these deities.

These structured rituals emphasize regularity and discipline in the practitioner's spiritual practice, serving as daily reminders of their commitment to the Thelemic path. By integrating these practices into their daily lives, Thelemites seek to harmonize their personal will with the divine will, achieving greater spiritual enlightenment and alignment with the natural order.

=== Dawn (east) ===
At dawn, practitioners face the East and invoke Ra, the Egyptian sun god associated with creation, life, and renewal. This invocation signifies new beginnings and the awakening of spiritual energy. The practitioner performs specific gestures and recites invocations, followed by a period of meditation. Ra's role as a creator god underscores themes of regeneration and the cyclical nature of life. The structure of this adoration is detailed in Crowley's writings, emphasizing the importance of dawn as the beginning of the daily cycle.

=== Noon (south) ===
At noon, facing South, practitioners invoke Ahathoor (Hathor), the goddess of motherhood, love, and joy. Hathor represents the Sun at its zenith, embodying the peak of energy and vitality. The noon adoration emphasizes strength, nurturing, and the fullness of life. Practitioners perform gestures and invocations specific to Hathor, followed by meditation. Hathor's associations with music, dance, and pleasure highlight the joyous and life-affirming aspects of the solar cycle. This adoration's structure involves gestures and words that connect the practitioner to the zenith of solar power, as outlined by Crowley.

=== Sunset (west) ===
At sunset, practitioners face the West and invoke Tum (Atum), the god of the setting Sun, symbolizing completeness and the end of the day. This adoration marks the transition from activity to rest, encouraging reflection on the day's achievements and preparation for renewal. Gestures and invocations specific to Atum are performed, followed by meditation. Atum's role in creation myths as the father of gods further emphasizes themes of wholeness and fulfillment. The ritual practice for sunset incorporates elements that help practitioners transition from the active day to a period of rest.

=== Midnight (north) ===
At midnight, facing North, practitioners invoke Khephra (Khepri), the scarab beetle god associated with the hidden Sun and symbolizing transformation and renewal. This invocation represents introspection and the renewal of energy for the next cycle. Practitioners perform gestures and invocations specific to Khepri, followed by meditation. Khepri's role in Egyptian mythology as a symbol of rebirth and regeneration underscores the transformative power of darkness and the promise of a new dawn. The midnight adoration's practice is designed to connect practitioners with the regenerative aspects of the night and the hidden Sun, preparing them for the coming day.

== Scholarly perspectives ==
Liber Resh vel Helios is a significant ritual within Thelemic practice, deeply embedded in Thelemic philosophy and emphasizing regular spiritual discipline and personal transformation. Scholarly analysis highlights its role in aligning practitioners with cosmic forces through daily solar adorations, structured to integrate Thelemic teachings into everyday life.

Henrik Bogdan's studies on Western esotericism and initiation rituals emphasize the importance of Liber Resh in fostering a disciplined approach to spiritual development. The ritual's structure, with its four daily adorations, aligns practitioners with the natural cycles of the Sun, reinforcing the Thelemic principle of discovering and fulfilling one's True Will. The meticulous record-keeping associated with the practice, where dates and times of rituals are recorded in the practitioner's magical record, underscores the integration of ritual with daily life and continuous self-monitoring of spiritual progress.

Wouter Hanegraaff provides a broader historical and cultural context, situating Liber Resh within the Western esoteric tradition. He notes its connections to ancient Egyptian symbolism and its adaptation in modern Thelemic practice. The ritual serves as an example of how esoteric practices can be integrated into daily life and personal spirituality, highlighting its significance in the academic study of Western esotericism.

== Impact and influence ==
Liber Resh vel Helios has had a significant impact on Thelemic practice and the broader field of Western esotericism. Its structured approach to daily solar adorations has become a cornerstone of Thelemic ritual, embodying the practical application of Thelemic philosophy.

The ritual's emphasis on aligning with the natural cycles of the Sun has influenced how Thelemites integrate their spiritual practices into daily life. By performing the adorations at specific times of the day—dawn, noon, sunset, and midnight—practitioners maintain a continuous connection with their spiritual goals and the cosmic forces represented by the Sun. This regularity fosters discipline, mindfulness, and a deeper understanding of one's True Will.

The impact of Liber Resh extends beyond individual practice to the broader Thelemic community. The ritual serves as a unifying practice that connects Thelemites worldwide, creating a shared rhythm and focus. This communal aspect reinforces the sense of belonging and shared purpose within the Thelemic community.

In the context of Western esotericism, Liber Resh exemplifies the adaptation of ancient symbols and practices into modern spiritual systems. The incorporation of Egyptian deities and the emphasis on solar cycles reflect a continuity of esoteric traditions, demonstrating how historical symbols can be reinterpreted and revitalized in contemporary contexts. This adaptation has contributed to the academic study of Western esotericism, providing insights into how modern practitioners draw on historical sources to create meaningful spiritual practices.

Moreover, the influence of Liber Resh can be seen in its adoption and adaptation by other esoteric traditions and occult practices. The structure and symbolism of the ritual have inspired similar practices in various spiritual paths, highlighting its versatility and enduring relevance. The emphasis on regularity, discipline, and alignment with natural cycles resonates with a wide range of spiritual seekers, making Liber Resh a contribution to the broader landscape of contemporary spirituality.

== See also ==
- Aleister Crowley bibliography
