= Little Essays Toward Truth =

1938 book written by Aleister Crowley

Cover of the 1991 edition of Little Essays Toward Truth by Aleister Crowley.

Little Essays Toward Truth is a 1938 book written by the mystic Aleister Crowley (1875–1947). It consists of sixteen philosophical essays on various topics within the framework of the Qabalah and Crowley's religion of Thelema. On the concept of truth, Crowley writes:

What then can be meant by the title of this compilation: Little Essays toward Truth? Do we not all assume a perfectly illogical conception of Truth as an entity of "the supra-mundane order, whence a whirling flame and flying Light subsist?" Do we not instinctively assimilate these ideas of Truth and Light, though there is no rational nexus? Is it not clear, then, that we do understand each other perfectly, so far as we can understand each other at all, in a sphere such as Zoroaster calls "Intelligible," which "subsisteth beyond Mind' but which we should "seek to grasp with the Flower of Mind"? (p.84).

The sixteen topics include: Man, Memory, Sorrow, Wonder, Beatitude, Laughter, Indifference, Mastery, Trance, Energy, Knowledge, Understanding, Chastity, Silence, Love, Truth.

== Editions ==
- New Falcon Publications, 1991. ISBN 1-56184-000-9

== See also ==
- Aleister Crowley bibliography
