= Richard Kaczynski =

American occult psychology writer

Richard Kaczynski (born 1963) is an American writer and lecturer in the fields of social psychology, metaphysical beliefs and new religious movements. He is known for his biography of the occultist Aleister Crowley, Perdurabo: The Life of Aleister Crowley, described by The Times Literary Supplement as "the major biography to date", and by Didrik Søderlind in the Norwegian daily Aftenposten as the best biography of Crowley.

Kaczynski is also a keyboard player for the band House of Usher.

== Academic background ==
Kaczynski holds a Bachelor of Science degree, master's degrees, and a PhD in social psychology from Wayne State University. He has held positions as assistant professor at Wayne State School of Medicine, research associate and affiliate at Yale University's Department of Psychiatry. He was also an adjunct instructor of orthodontics at the University of Detroit Mercy School of Dentistry.

He has published dozens of articles in academic peer-reviewed journals in areas ranging from national program evaluation of comprehensive work therapy, and multi-site clinical trials of treatment efficacy for bipolar disorder (STEP-BD), schizophrenia (CATIE) and Alzheimer's (CATIE).

== Religious background ==
Kaczynski has been a student of Thelema since 1977, and a lecturer on magic since 1990. He has been a very active member of the para-Masonic Thelemic Ordo Templi Orientis, and has done editorial duties on several publications including Neshamah and the proceedings books for its US biennial national conference.

== Works ==
Kaczynski's occult writings have appeared in various magazines including High Times, The Magical Link, Neshamah, Cheth, Mezlim, Eidolon, and Different Worlds. His medical and psychological writing has appeared in several publications in those fields.

=== Books ===
- The Revival of Magick and Other Essays by Aleister Crowley. Hymenaeus Beta and Richard Kaczynski, ed. New Falcon, 1998. ISBN 978-1-56184-133-2.
- Perdurabo: The Life of Aleister Crowley. New Falcon Publications, 2002. ISBN 1-56184-170-6
- Perdurabo Outtakes. Blue Equinox, 2005.
- Panic in Detroit: The Magician and the Motor City. Blue Equinox, 2006.
- The Weiser Concise Guide to Aleister Crowley (co-authored with James Wasserman). Weiser Books, 2009. ISBN 978-1-57863-456-9
- Beauty and Strength: Proceedings of the Sixth Biennial National Ordo Templi Orientis Conference R. Kaczynski, ed., BookSurge Publishing, 2009. ISBN 1-4392-4734-X
- Perdurabo, Revised and Expanded Edition: The Life of Aleister Crowley 2nd ed., North Atlantic Books. ISBN 978-1-55643-899-8
- Forgotten Templars, The Untold Origins of the Ordo Templi Orientis, 2012

=== Religious articles ===
- Kaczynski, R. (1989). Preface to J.F.C. Fuller’s Bibliotheca Crowleyana. Edmonds, WA: Sure Fire Press.
- Kaczynski, R. (1993). "The Structure and Correlates of Metaphysical Beliefs Among a Sample of Behaviorally Committed Participants". Doctoral dissertation, Wayne State University, Detroit.
- "Foreword" to People of the Earth: The New Pagans Speak Out by Ellen Evert Hopman, Lawrence Bond. Inner Traditions, 1995. ISBN 0-89281-559-0 reissued and renamed Being a Pagan: Druids, Wiccans, and Witches Today Destiny Books 2001 ISBN 0-89281-904-9, ISBN 978-0-89281-904-1
- "Daybreak: Early History and Origins of the British Golden Dawn" in Golden Dawn Sourcebook by Darcy Kuntz. Holmes Publishing, (1996). ISBN 1-55818-332-9
- "Taboo and Transformation in the Works of Aleister Crowley" in Rebels & Devils: The Psychology of Liberation, edited by Christopher S. Hyatt. New Falcon Publications, (1996). ISBN 1-56184-153-6
- Kaczynski, R. (1996). Barking up the wrong tree: The Kabbalah that the western Hermetic tradition overlooked. In P. Kershaw (Ed.), Proceedings of Convocation ’96. Magical Education Council of Ann Arbor: Ann Arbor, MI.
- Kaczynski, R. (1998). Equidistant letter sequences: A guide for the perplexed. In P. Kershaw (Ed.), Proceedings of Convocation ’98. Magical Education Council of Ann Arbor: Ann Arbor, MI.
- Kaczynski, R. (1999). An introduction to “The Revival of Magick” In Proceedings of Convocation ’99. Magical Education Council of Ann Arbor: Ann Arbor, MI.
- Kaczynski, R. (2001). One is the magus, twain his biographies. The Magical Link, 3:8-9.
- Kaczynski, R. (2003). Wine and strange drugs: Aleister Crowley’s quest for enlightenment. High Times, November, 339:64-66.
- Kaczynski, R. (2005). The Satanic ritual abuse controversy: A case of groupthink? Neshamah, 1(1), 7–10.
- Kaczynski, R. (2005). Metaphysical belief correlates in a behaviorally committed sample. Neshamah, 1(1), 34–38.
- Kaczynski, R. (2008). Foreword. In Colin D. Campbell (ed.), A Concordance to the Holy Books of Thelema. York Beach, ME: Teitan Press.
- Kaczynski, R. (2009). Carl Kellner’s occult roots: Sex and sex magick in the Victorian age. In Richard Kaczynski (ed.), Beauty & Strength: Proceedings of the Sixth Biennial National Conference of Ordo Templi Orientis. Riverside, CA: Ordo Templi Orientis
- Kaczynski, R. (2009). Iconic or iconoclastic? The Thoth Tarot and the Western esoteric tradition. Tarosophist International #4 (September).
- Kaczynski, R. (2010). The Method of Science: Ten Steps toward Scientific Illuminism. Neshamah (fall 2010).
- Kaczynski, R. (2011), Introducing Perdurabo, Watkins Review, summer, 2011 issue.

=== Films ===
- Donna Zuckerbrot (2007). Enigma: Aleister Crowley: The Beast 666 (Television production). Vision TV.

=== Music ===
House of Usher

- Body of Mind (1998) - House of Usher
- Fanfare for the Pirates (1998) Mellow Records
- Live Encore? (40 minutes live from Progday 1999) (2001)

Page

- Giant for a Life: A Tribute to Gentle Giant - Mellow Records
- Zarathustra's Revenge - Mellow Records
- Fanfare for the Pirates - (1998) Mellow Records

== See also ==
- Aleister Crowley bibliography
- List of Thelemites
- Members of Ordo Templi Orientis
