= The Confessions of Aleister Crowley =

Partial autobiography by Aleister Crowley

- Editor: John Symonds, Kenneth Grant
- Author: Aleister Crowley
- Genre: Autobiography
- Publication date: 1969

The Confessions of Aleister Crowley: An Autohagiography is a partial autobiography by the poet and occultist Aleister Crowley. It covers the early years of his life up until the mid-late 1920s but does not include the latter part of Crowley's life and career between then and his death in 1947.

Mandrake Press published the first two sections as separate volumes under the title The Spirit of Solitude in 1929.

== Background ==
Crowley had originally intended that the work would be published in six volumes, but only two of these had been published before the Great Depression and various internal disputes led to the demise of the publishers. The project languished uncompleted throughout Crowley's lifetime, and it was not until 1969 that the Confessions were issued in a single volume edition, edited by John Symonds and Kenneth Grant. Whilst the single volume edition includes much of the text of the first two volumes (and of course that of the latter four) it is nonetheless an abridgement. These original volumes include a considerable amount of text, and many photographs – particularly pertaining to Crowley's travels and mountaineering exploits – that were not reproduced in the later single volume.

It is subtitled An Autohagiography which refers to the autobiography of a saint, usually in a traditional Christian context, as in The Confessions of Saint Augustine. Crowley was brought up by his parents as a member of the strict Christian fundamentalist sect the Plymouth Brethren. While Crowley considered himself in many ways to be as holy as any Christian saint, hagiographies are usually written about the lives of saints by others and writing an "Autohagiography" was rarely heard of before Crowley. His self-titling of his autobiography as an "autohagiography" may be considered either as an example of Crowley's sense of humour, or his inflated ego, or possibly both.

== Contents ==
- Towards the Golden Dawn
- The Mystical Adventure
- The Advent of the Aeon of Horus
- Magical Workings
- The Magus
- At the Abbey of Thelema

== Description ==
The Confessions provides Crowley's own point of view on the many incidents of the first half of his life. There are extensive descriptions of several mountaineering expeditions to exotic places such as the Himalayas. In reference to his early years of being raised by fundamentalist Christians, Crowley explains how he became a rebel against conventional religion and how his behaviour and conflicts with authority figures contributed to his reputation as a dark magician. Whilst Crowley does not deny dabbling with demonic forces, his memoirs reveal that his aim was the progress and spiritual freedom of humanity.

The volume only covers part of Crowley's life until the 1920s; the material was all written by the late 1920s, when Mandrake Press issued the first two sections in hardcover. The one-volume edition is over 900 pages long. Crowley often refers to associates and enemies by their magical names. Crowley was independently wealthy, and published his many volumes of prose and poetry in lavish editions, exhausting his wealth via both this means and via extensive travel and luxuriant living under varied pseudonyms and assumed identities. In consequence, there were stages of his life in which he and those around him were penurious in the extreme, such as the time at his Abbey of Thelema at Cefalù, Sicily. Crowley led a bohemian existence, was married more than once, and had innumerable mistresses, of whom some were magical partners designated by him as "Scarlet Women". He was also bisexual and had love affairs with men in his university days and later.

== Editions ==
- Arkana Publishing. Reprint edition, 5 December 1989. ISBN 0-14-019189-5
- Routledge & Kegan Paul. Corrected ed edition, 1979. ISBN 0-7100-0175-4

== See also ==
- Aleister Crowley bibliography
- Leila Waddell
