= Magick Without Tears =

Book by Aleister Crowley

- Editor: Karl Germer
- Author: Aleister Crowley
- Language: English
- Genre: Non-fiction
- Publisher: Thelema Publishing Company
- Publication date: 1954

Magick Without Tears, a series of letters, was the last book written by English occultist Aleister Crowley (1875–1947), although it was not published until after his death. It was written in 1943 and published in 1954 with a foreword by its editor, Karl Germer.

== Summary ==
The book consists of 80 letters to various students of magick. Originally to be titled Aleister Explains Everything, the letters offer his insights into both magick and Thelema—Crowley's religious and ethical system—with a clarity and wit often absent in his earlier writings. The individual topics are widely varied, addressing the orders O.T.O. and A∴A∴, Qabalah, Thelemic morality, Yoga, astrology, various magical techniques, religion, death, spiritual visions, the Holy Guardian Angel, and other issues such as marriage, property, certainty, and meanness.

== Editions ==
- Germer, Karl, ed. (1954). Magick Without Tears (1st ed.). Thelema Publishing Company. With a foreword by its editor.
- Regardie, Israel, ed. (1973). Magick Without Tears. LLewellyn Publication. ISBN 978-0875421155. With an introduction by its editor.
- Regardie, Israel, ed. (1982). Magick Without Tears. Falcon Press. ISBN 0-941404-17-X. With a new afterword by the publisher.
- Regardie, Israel, ed. (1991). Magick Without Tears. New Falcon Publications. ISBN 1-56184-018-1.

== See also ==
- Aleister Crowley bibliography
