= Great Work (Hermeticism) =

Term used in Hermeticism

Great Work (Latin: magnum opus) is a term used in Hermeticism and occult traditions descended from it, such as Thelema. Accomplishing the Great Work, symbolized as the creation of the philosopher's stone, represents the culmination of the spiritual path, the attainment of enlightenment, or the rescue of the human soul from the unconscious forces which bind it. The Great Work signifies the spiritual path towards self-transcendence in its entirety. This is the process of bringing unconscious complexes into the conscious awareness, in order to integrate them back into oneself.

== Ceremonial magic ==
=== Eliphas Levi ===
Eliphas Levi (1810–1875), one of the first modern ceremonial magicians and inspiration for the Hermetic Order of the Golden Dawn, discussed the Great Work at length, giving it a spiritual meaning by analogy to the alchemical magnum opus of 'perfecting' lead into gold and mortality into immortality:

Furthermore, there exists in nature a force which is immeasurably more powerful than steam, and by means of which a single man, who knows how to adapt and direct it, might upset and alter the face of the world. This force was known to the ancients; it consists in a universal agent having equilibrium for its supreme law, while its direction is concerned immediately with the great arcanum of transcendental magic... This agent...is precisely that which the adepts of the middle ages denominated the first matter of the Great Work. The Gnostics represented it as the fiery body of the Holy Spirit; it was the object of adoration in the secret rites of the Sabbath and the Temple, under the hieroglyphic figure of Baphomet or the Androgyne of Mendes.

He further defined it as such:

The Great Work is, before all things, the creation of man by himself, that is to say, the full and entire conquest of his faculties and his future; it is especially the perfect emancipation of his will.

=== Thelema ===
Within Thelema, the Great Work is generally defined as those spiritual practices leading to the mystical union of the Self and the All through the accomplishment of True Will. Its founder, author and occultist Aleister Crowley, re-iterated the idea of the unification of opposites, saying in his book Magick Without Tears:

The Great Work is the uniting of opposites. It may mean the uniting of the soul with God, of the microcosm with the macrocosm, of the female with the male, of the ego with the non-ego."

Although the Great Work can describe specifically the moment of union between the self and the divine, it can also deal with the spiritual process in its entirety. Crowley also speaks on the Great Work as the conscious process of spiritual growth. The aspect of conscious devotion to the Great Work is very important. By purposefully, consciously turning inward and choosing to pursue self-realization, the seeker seals themselves in their very own vas hermeticum, their very own alchemical vessel. This attitude of deliberate turning within is necessary for the Great Work. By consciously devoting oneself to the Great Work, and therefore sealing oneself within one's own vas hermeticum, the inner heat of psychic struggle which is generated from this aids in the dissolution of ego boundaries and the integration of what is unconscious.
