= Lawrence Sutin =

American author and artist (born 1951)

- Sutin in 2013
- Born: 1951 (age 74–75); Minneapolis–Saint Paul, Minnesota, U.S.
- Education: University of Michigan (BA); Harvard Law (JD)
- Occupations: Author, erasure artist
- Writing career
- Genres: Memoir, biography, novel, history
- Website: www.lawrencesutin.com

Lawrence Sutin (born 1951) is an American author and erasure artist. He wrote biographies of Philip K. Dick and Aleister Crowley, two memoirs, a novel, and a history of Buddhism in the West. He was a professor of creative writing at Hamline University and the Vermont College of Fine Arts.

== Early life and education ==
Sutin was born on October 12, 1951 in Minneapolis–Saint Paul, Minnesota. As an undergraduate, he studied English and psychology at the University of Michigan. He earned a Juris Doctor degree from Harvard University.

== Career ==
Sutin was a full professor in the M.F.A. and M.A.L.S. programs at the Hamline University Creative Writing Program in St. Paul, Minnesota. He retired from Hamline in 2015. He was also a faculty member of the Vermont College of Fine Arts.

Sutin's debut book was the science fiction author Philip K. Dick biography Divine Invasions: A Life of Philip K. Dick (1989). He subsequently edited two volumes of writings by Dick, In Pursuit of Valis: Selections from the Exegesis (1991), referring to The Exegesis of Philip K. Dick, and The Shifting Realities of Philip K. Dick: Selected Literary and Philosophical Writings (1996). Sutin's second biography, on the English occultist Aleister Crowley, was Do What Thou Wilt: A Life of Aleister Crowley, published in 2000.

Sutin also served as editor, interviewer and author for Jack and Rochelle: A Holocaust Story of Love and Resistance (1995), about his parents' experiences in Jewish partisan units in World War II in Poland. Sutin's next memoir was A Postcard Memoir (2000), a set of interlocking short pieces each faced by a vintage postcard image from the author's collection. His next work was a history of Buddhism in the West: All Is Change: The Two-Thousand Year Journey of Buddhism to the West (2006). Sutin published a novel, When To Go Into the Water, in 2009.

Sutin creates erasure books with collaged and altered texts; excerpts from these have been published online in the literary journals WaterStone and Sleet. He was inspired to make erasures by Mary Ruefle. In 2014, he founded the small press See Double Press to publish erasures, beginning with Ruefle's. In July 2021, Sutin was awarded a blue ribbon at the Island County fair in the bookmaking class for his erasure work "Lives of the Great Composers".

== Selected works ==
=== Authored ===
- Divine Invasions: A Life of Philip K. Dick. Harmony Books, 1989; revised 2005. ISBN 978-0-517-57204-7
- Do What Thou Wilt: A Life of Aleister Crowley. St. Martin's Press, 2000. ISBN 0-312-25243-9
- A Postcard Memoir. Graywolf Press, 2000. ISBN 978-1-55597-304-9
- All Is Change: The Two-Thousand Year Journey of Buddhism to the West. Little, Brown, 2006. ISBN 0-316-74156-6
- When To Go Into the Water. Sarabande Books, 2009. ISBN 978-1-932511-72-7

=== Edited ===
- In Pursuit of Valis: Selections from the Exegesis (editor). Underwood-Miller, 1991. ISBN 978-0-887-33091-9
- Jack and Rochelle: A Holocaust Story of Love and Resistance (editor). Graywolf Press, 1995. ISBN 978-1-55597-243-1
- The Shifting Realities of Philip K. Dick: Selected Literary and Philosophical Writings (editor). Vintage Books, 1996. ISBN 978-0-679-74-787-1
