= A∴A∴ =

Initiatory magical order

The seal of the A∴A∴

The A∴A∴ (/ˌeɪˈeɪ/ ay-AY) is a magical organization established in 1907 by Aleister Crowley, a Western esotericist, and George Cecil Jones. Its members are dedicated to the advancement of humanity by perfection of the individual on every plane through a graded series of universal initiations. Its initiations are syncretic, unifying the essence of Theravada Buddhism with Vedantic yoga and ceremonial magic. The A∴A∴ applies what it describes as mystical and magical methods of spiritual attainment under the structure of the Qabalistic Tree of Life, and aims to research, practise, and teach "scientific illuminism".

A central document within the A∴A∴ system is One Star in Sight, which provides a detailed framework for the aspirant's journey through various grades of spiritual development. This document outlines the stages from the initial grade of Probationer to the ultimate attainment of Ipsissimus, each representing significant milestones in the individual's spiritual evolution. "One Star in Sight" emphasizes practices such as meditation, ritual magic, and the invocation of the Knowledge and Conversation of the Holy Guardian Angel, aiming to guide the aspirant towards achieving personal discipline, intellectual mastery, and spiritual attainment. The document is essential for understanding the A∴A∴'s structured approach to spiritual enlightenment and the syncretic nature of its teachings.

== History ==
The A∴A∴ describes itself as having been present in all societies and epochs, although not necessarily under that name.

The A∴A∴ is composed of two orders, known as the inner and outer college. The outer college in its modern form was formulated in 1907 by Aleister Crowley and George Cecil Jones, who stated that they derived their authority to do so from Aiwass (the Author of The Book of the Law) and other Secret Chiefs of the planetary spiritual order after the schism in and subsequent collapse of the Hermetic Order of the Golden Dawn at the turn of the twentieth century. The principal holy book of the A∴A∴ is the book Crowley called AL and Liber Legis, technically called Liber AL vel Legis sub figura CCXX as delivered by 93=418 to DCLXVI, whose scriptural title is The Book of the Law, by which name the Book is most commonly known and referred to. There are several other holy books venerated in A∴A∴, which comprise the so-called Class A and AB material.

In 1919 the O.T.O. considered itself to be a "close ally" of the A∴A∴, both organisations having accepted the authority of The Book of the Law, although the O.T.O., being a temporal and fraternal society, in no way participates in the A∴A∴'s strictly hierarchic and spiritual initiatory program, nor does O.T.O. represent A∴A∴. or transmit its functions or authority.

The classic account of A∴A∴ is Karl Von Eckharthausen's The Cloud upon the Sanctuary, re-issued by the A∴A∴ as Liber XXXIII: An Account of A∴A∴.

=== After Crowley ===
Following Crowley's death in 1947, his student Karl Germer took over running the outer college of the order, (Note: Sutin (2002), p. 419: "In a June 1947 letter to the most loyal of his disciples, Crowley specified that Germer should succeed him in the leadership of the O.T.O.") but since Germer's death the situation has been less clear. Various lineages of the A∴A∴ that survive today descend from Crowley's order.

One such lineage descends from Crowley's student, actress Jane Wolfe (known as Soror Estai). Soror Estai's one student, Phyllis Seckler (Soror Meral), founded College of Thelema in 1973 and (with James A. Eshelman and Anna-Kria King) founded Temple of Thelema in 1987. She designated Eshelman as her successor in the Jane Wolfe branch of A∴A∴ and as chancellor of College of Thelema. Later, she also affirmed David Shoemaker's authority to "admit, supervise, and train" A∴A∴ initiates.

Several lineages run through pupils of Marcelo Ramos Motta, such as that of J. Daniel Gunther. Another lineage links itself to Crowley through Israel Regardie and his pupil Gerald Suster. Other lineages run through Grady McMurtry and Charles Stansfeld Jones.

== Name ==
Language	Possible Name	Translation
Latin	Argenteum Astrum	silver star Note: This name has frequently been asserted as the true name of the Order; however, according to James Eshelman, this Latin translation of the phrase "silver star" is not the correct name of the Order.
Greek	Άστρον Αργόν (transliteration: Astron Argon)	silver star James Eshelman gives the true name of the Order as (transliteration: Astron Argon.) By gematria this name enumerates to 451, the value of the Greek words Konx Om Pax, an important mystical phrase interpreted in the old Hermetic Order of the Golden Dawn as meaning "Light in Extension". Eshelman also points out that 451 also corresponds to the Hebrew phrase Eth ha-Adam, "The Essence of Humanity". A variant on this Greek rendering of the words "Silver Star" is Aster Argos. Eshelman states that due to Crowley's use of the phrase "Astron Argon" (once in a note and once in an official document in Crowley's handwriting) that the latter is to be taken as the true Greek name. The gematria of Aster Argos is 489, also the value of Sothis, the Greek name for the star Sirius. Eshelman states that "Sirius commonly is held to be the physical expression of that 'Silver Star' after which the Order is named."
Latin	Arcanum Arcanorum	secret of secrets. James Eshelman states "Were we not otherwise informed, we might suspect that these initials refer to the Arcanum Arcanorum ('Secret of Secrets'), which is to be found within the Sanctum Sanctorum ('Holy of Holies'). In fact, the initials have a different meaning."
English	Angel and Abyss	Angel and Abyss Eshelman explains this as an 'affectionate' meaning for the Order's name. It refers to the work of the initiate in working with the Holy Guardian Angel and with the work of aspiring to cross the Abyss of the Qabalistic Tree of Life.
English	Atlantean Adepts	Atlantean Adepts Suggested by L. Sprague de Camp.
none	A∴A∴	In the novel series The Illuminatus! Trilogy, Robert Anton Wilson and Robert Shea asserted that A∴A∴ is the entire name of the fraternity; they argue that the name is a trap for debunking anyone who falsely claimed membership, as any ascribed meaning they would offer would be known by actual members to be incorrect. Whether Wilson and Shea meant this as a serious proposal outside of the novel is unclear.
Aramaic	אריך אנפין (transliteration: Aryk Anpin)	In Crowley's Sepher Sephiroth, the order's name is mentioned as a shorthand for Aryk Anpin, or "the vast countenance", a Qabalastic reference to the Macroprosopus from the Zohar as well as the Book of Daniel 8:23. The sum of Aryk Anpin is 422, connecting it with Linea Flava or path of the Sun through the sky. Crowley put a special emphasis on the Egyptian story of Ra's traveling across the sky in his Solar Bark in his own mythology. The Order acts as the external counterpart to the Magician's own internal reality, the individual Star, traveling through each Grade as the Sun passes through the Sky of Nu. In Thelemic eschatology, this corresponds to the relationship between Nuit and Hadit, respectively.

== Membership ==
Members of the First Order of A∴A∴ (Golden Dawn) and Dominus Liminis are sworn to openly declare everywhere their connection with A∴A∴ (Liber CLXXXV). Adepts, however, are expected to work in silence, whereas Magi are required to declare "their Law". The Ipsissimi, who "existeth without form", the highest initiates manifest on this plane, are sworn to silence as to their attainment to this degree (Liber B vel Magi, One Star in Sight).

In A∴A∴ members officially only know those directly above and below in the chain of instruction. Members are expected to work alone, consulting as needed with their superior in the Order. In this way the founders of the system hoped to avoid the many political problems that allegedly brought about the downfall of the predecessor organisation, the Hermetic Order of the Golden Dawn. The A∴A∴ is an organisation focused on enlightenment of the individual, with a strong emphasis on maintaining the chain of initiation from teacher to student, and devoting all of one's attainments to those individuals below them (One Star in Sight).

All members of the A∴A∴ at some point, are expected to perform two central tasks:

- The Task of the grade of Adeptus Minor, the first grade of the Middle Order, being the attainment of the experience known as the Knowledge and Conversation of the Holy Guardian Angel, the attainment of which is the central theme of the order's official instructions
- The experience of the passage through the Abyss, resulting in the attainment of the grade of Magister Templi, the first grade in the Third Order

Any person may swear the Oath of the Master of the Temple of A∴A∴ and be admitted into the Opening of the Grade of Magister Templi and the Order of the S∴S∴ the opening of which is the passage through the Abyss.

It is the strict and inviolable rule of the Order that members of A∴A∴ never accept payment or other consideration for initiation or other services, on pain of irredeemable expulsion.

== Initiatory structure ==
The initiatory structure of A∴A∴ is based on the Qabalistic Tree Of Life, its grades following the sephirot up the tree in reverse order. The A∴A∴ is sub-divided into three orders: The S.S., being the governing body (Third Order) and comprising those grades that are above the Abyss; The R.R. et A.C. (Second Order), comprising those degrees that are below the Abyss but above the Veil of Paroketh; and The Golden Dawn (First Order), comprising the grades below the Veil of Paroketh. A complete description of the tasks of the First Order is given in Liber XIII vel Graduum Montis Abiegni: a syllabus of the steps upon path, in The Equinox Volume 1.

Two additional "grades", the Dwellers on the Thresholds, link the orders: Dominus Limnis in Paroketh, and Babe of the Abyss in the Abyss.

Members of the Third Order can generate their own variations of the First and Second Order teachings as reflections of their own Understanding, contemplating systems of attainment not compassed in the curriculum of the main system.

=== Student ===
A student's business is to acquire a general intellectual knowledge of all systems of attainment, as declared in the prescribed books. At the end of a fixed period, the Student takes a written examination to test his reading, after which he passes through a small ritual involving the reading of the History Lection (Liber LXI), and passes to the grade of Probationer.

=== The Order of the G∴D∴ (Golden Dawn) ===
==== Probationer ====
(0°=0^{□}): The Probationer's principal business is to begin such practices as he or she may prefer, and to write a careful record of the same for at least one year.

==== Neophyte ====
(1°=10^{□}): Has to acquire perfect control of the body of light on the astral plane.

==== Zelator ====
(2°=9^{□}): The Zelator's main work is to achieve complete success in asana and pranayama. The Zelator also begins to study the formula of the Rose Cross.

==== Practicus ====
(3°=8^{□}): Is expected to complete the intellectual training, and in particular to study Qabalah.

==== Philosophus ====
(4°=7^{□}): Is expected to complete the moral training. Is tested in Devotion to the Order.

==== Dominus Liminis ====
(The Link): Is expected to show mastery of pratyahara and dharana.

=== The Order of the R∴C∴ (Rosy Cross) ===
==== Adeptus Minor (Without) ====
(5°=6^{□}): Lesser Adept (Without). Is expected to perform the Great Work and to attain the Knowledge and Conversation of the Holy Guardian Angel. In the system of the A∴A∴ magical order, the single most important goal is to consciously connect with one's HGA and, by doing so, the magician becomes fully aware of their own True Will. For Crowley, this event was the single most important goal of any adept:

It should never be forgotten for a single moment that the central and essential work of the Magician is the attainment of the Knowledge and Conversation of the Holy Guardian Angel. Once he has achieved this he must of course be left entirely in the hands of that Angel, who can be invariably and inevitably relied upon to lead him to the further great step—crossing of the Abyss and the attainment of the grade of Master of the Temple.

==== Adeptus Minor (Within) ====
(5°=6^{□}): Lesser Adept (Within). Is admitted to the practice of the formula of the Rosy Cross on entering the College of the Holy Ghost.

==== Adeptus Major ====
(6°=5^{□}): Greater Adept. Obtains a general mastery of practical Magick, though without comprehension.

==== Adeptus Exemptus ====
(7°=4^{□}): Exempt Adept. After one attains Knowledge and Conversation with the Holy Guardian Angel and completes in perfection all these matters, the adept may attempt the crossing of the Abyss, the great gulf or void between the phenomenal world of manifestation and its noumenal source, that great spiritual wilderness which must be crossed by the adept to attain mastery. Choronzon is the Dweller in the Abyss; he is there as the final obstruction. If he is met with the proper preparation, then he is there to destroy the ego, which allows the adept to move beyond the Abyss. If unprepared, then the unfortunate traveller will be utterly dispersed into annihilation, leaving the adept to become a Brother of the Left Hand Path. If successful, the adept stripped of all their attainments and of their self as well, even of their Holy Guardian Angel, and becoming a Babe of the Abyss, who, having transcended the Reason, does nothing but grow in the womb of its mother, Babalon.

=== The Order of the S∴S∴ (Silver Star) ===
==== Magister Templi ====
(8°=3^{□}): Babalon is on the other side of the Abyss (beckoning in the sphere of Binah on the Tree of Life). If the adept gives himself to her—the symbol of this act is the pouring of the adept's blood into her graal—he becomes impregnated in her (a state called "Babe of the Abyss"), then he is reborn as a Master and a Saint that dwells in the City of the Pyramids, becoming a Master of the Temple (Magister Templi). The principal business of this grade is to obtain a perfect understanding of the Universe. The Magister Templi is pre-eminently the Master of Mysticism, that is, his Understanding is entirely free from internal contradiction or external obscurity; his Work is to comprehend the existing Universe in accordance with his own Mind. This grade corresponds to Binah on the Tree of Life. Crowley also linked it with the experience he called "Shivadarshana" and with the Four Formless States of Buddhism, although he cautions against treating these criteria as sufficient for the grade.

In Thelema, the City of the Pyramids is the home to those adepts that have crossed the great Abyss, having spilled all their blood in the Graal of Babalon. They are said to have destroyed their earthly ego-identities, becoming nothing more than piles of dust (i.e., the remaining aspects of their True Selves without the self-sense of "I"). It is considered a step along the path of spiritual purification, and a spiritual resting place for those who have successfully shed their attachments to the mundane world.

The City exists under the Night of Pan, or N.O.X. Pan is both the giver and the taker of life, and his Night is that time of symbolic death where the adept experiences unification with the All through the ecstatic destruction of the ego-self. In a less poetic symbolic sense, this is the state where one transcends all limitations and experiences oneness with the universe.

==== Magus ====
(9°=2^{□}): The Magus seeks to attain Wisdom (symbolized by entering Chokmah on the Tree of Life), declares his law, and is a Master of all Magick in its greatest and highest sense. His will is entirely free from internal diversion or external opposition; His work is to create a new Universe in accordance with his Will. This grade corresponds to Chokmah on the Tree of Life. It also bears some resemblance to Nietzsche's "new philosopher" who creates values, although with more focus on self-transcendence according to Crowley biographer Lawrence Sutin. The state of being a Magus is described in Crowley's Liber B vel Magi. Of the Magi, Crowley writes:

There are many magical teachers but in recorded history we have scarcely had a dozen Magi in the technical sense of the word. They may be recognized by the fact that their message may be formulated as a single word, which word must be such that it overturns all existing beliefs and codes. We may take as instances the Word of Buddha—Anatta (absence of an atman or soul) [...] Mohammed, again, with the single word Allah [...] Similarly, Aiwass, uttering the word Thelema (with all its implications), destroys completely the formula of the Dying God.

Elsewhere, he admits the possibility of someone reaching this rank without uttering a new magick Word. Such a Magus, he says, would identify himself or herself with the Word of the current Aeon and work to establish it. In Magick Without Tears, Crowley suggests (without actually saying so) that the Secret Chiefs of the A∴A∴ have reached at least the rank of Magus, in some sense.

==== Ipsissimus ====
(10°=1^{□}): The state of Ipsissimus is the very highest grade possible (symbolized by the sphere of Kether on the Tree of Life), beyond the comprehension of the lower degrees. An Ipsissimus is free from limitations and necessity and lives in perfect balance with the manifest universe. Essentially, the highest mode of attainment. This grade corresponds to Kether on the Tree of Life. Ipsissimus is quite hard to translate directly from Latin to English, but it is essentially the superlative of "self", translating rather approximately to "His most Selfness", or "self-est". (cf. generalissimus for the same superlative form in use for a grade from same Latin root.)

Crowley named as a condition of this grade the trance Nirodha-samapatti, which reduces heartbeat and other life functions to the bare minimum. (Note: Narada Maha Thera, quoted in Lusthaus (2014), p. 139) Theravada Buddhist monks traditionally attain nirodha-samapatti by producing the aforementioned Formless States one after the other, and perceiving in each what they call the Three Characteristics of all existence: sorrow or tendency towards sorrow, change or unreliability, and insubstantiality or lack of self. Crowley and the A∴A∴ however seek to replace this threefold concept of existence with the quest for balance as both a motive for discipline and the means of achieving their end goal. (Note: Diary quoted as explanation in Sutin (2002), p. 277: "The whole point is to make (attainment) perfect in balance. Then it radiates light in every direction, while the Ipsissimus is utterly indifferent to it.") In Liber B vel Magi they urge the Magus seeking further progress to identify the Buddhist Three Characteristics with the opposite states. "Wherein Sorrow is Joy, and Change is Stability, and Selflessness is Self." Crowley's version of nirodha includes "seeing first the truth and then the falsity of the Three Characteristics" according to his published theory.

The Ipsissimus should keep the achievement of this final grade secret, even from the rest of the Order, and continue with the work of the Magus while expressing the nature of an Ipsissimus in word and deed. Crowley writes:

The Ipsissimus is wholly free from all limitations whatsoever, existing in the nature of all things without discriminations of quantity or quality between them. He has identified Being and not-Being and Becoming, action and non-action and tendency to action, with all other such triplicities, not distinguishing between them in respect of any conditions, or between any one thing and any other thing as to whether it is with or without conditions.

He is sworn to accept this Grade in the presence of a witness, and to express its nature in word and deed, but to withdraw Himself at once within the veils of his natural manifestation as a man, and to keep silence during his human life as to the fact of his attainment, even to the other members of the Order.

The Ipsissimus is pre-eminently the Master of all modes of existence; that is, his being is entirely free from internal or external necessity. His work is to destroy all tendencies to construct or to cancel such necessities. He is the Master of the Law of Unsubstantiality (Anatta).

The Ipsissimus has no relation as such with any Being: He has no will in any direction, and no Consciousness of any kind involving duality, for in Him all is accomplished; as it is written 'beyond the Word and the Fool, yea, beyond the Word and the Fool'.

== See also ==
- Aleister Crowley bibliography
- Magical organization
- Secret society
- Worship of heavenly bodies
