= Charles Stansfeld Jones =

Canadian writer, occultist and magician (1886–1950)

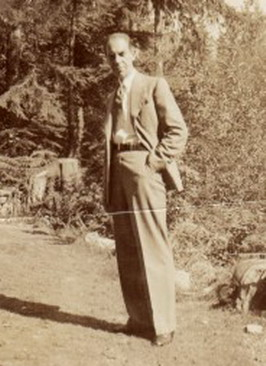
- Charles Stansfeld Jones
- Born: 1886; London, England
- Died: 1950
- Occupations: Accountant; Occultist; Magician

Charles Robert Stansfeld Jones (/ˈstænsfiːld/ STANSS-feeld; 1886–1950), aka Frater Achad, was a Canadian occultist and ceremonial magician. An early aspirant to the A∴A∴ (the 20th to be admitted as a Probationer, in December 1909) who "claimed" the grade of Magister Templi as a Neophyte. He was also an initiate of Ordo Templi Orientis, serving as the principal organizer for that order in British Columbia, Canada. He worked under a variety of mottos and acronymic titles, including V.I.O. (Unus in Omnibus, "One in All," as an A∴A∴ Probationer), O.I.V.V.I.O., V.I.O.O.I.V., Parzival (as an Adeptus Minor and O.T.O. Ninth Degree), and Tantalus Leucocephalus (as Tenth Degree O.T.O.), but he is best known under his Neophyte motto "Achad" (Hebrew: אחד, "unity"), which he used as a byline in his various published writings.

== Early life ==
Jones was born in London on 2 April 1886. He became an accountant. Prior to joining the A∴A∴, he investigated Spiritualism, as recounted in the notes of his magical progress, "A Master of the Temple."

== Magical child of Aleister Crowley ==
Having been recruited through Crowley's publication The Equinox in 1909, he was attracted to the A∴A∴ 's avowed motto of 'The Method of Science, the aim of Religion' and became the twentieth person to join Aleister Crowley's A∴A∴ order. Jones' motto as a Probationer was Vnvs in Omnibvs (V.I.O.), and his supervising Neophyte was J. F. C. Fuller (Per Ardua). When Fuller later withdrew from the A∴A∴, Aleister Crowley took over as Jones' superior. Jones advanced to Neophyte, taking the motto Achad, which he was subsequently to use for most of his published writings, and by which he is best known. Jones continued his work under Crowley in the Outer Order of A∴A∴ until the former decided to "take 8=3, in case that is what the Master really needed," i.e. to claim the grade of Magister Templi in the Third Order, thus assisting Crowley's advancement to the further grade of Magus, by filling "the Master's" current position in the A∴A∴ hierarchy. Jones took the Magister Templi obligation (i.e. "the Oath of the Abyss") and notified Crowley.

The news came as a profound revelation to Crowley. Nine months earlier he had been involved in a set of sex-magical operations with Sr. Hilarion (Jeanne Robert Foster) in an apparently unsuccessful effort to conceive a child. Crowley noted the nine-month interval and concluded that Jones' "birth" as a Babe of the Abyss qualified him as the "magical child" of Crowley and Hilarion. He welcomed Jones to the Third Order, and declared him to be his "beloved son." Eventually, goaded by suggestions from Jones and impressed by his qabalistic insights into Thelema's founding volume, The Book of the Law (especially his essay "Liber 31"), Crowley came to consider the younger man the "child" and the "one" prophesied in the book (in I:55–56 and similar passages).

=== Ouija board ===
Crowley and Jones frequently discussed the Ouija board and it is often mentioned in their unpublished letters.

Throughout 1917 Achad experimented with the board as a means of summoning Angels, as opposed to Elementals. In one letter Crowley told Jones:, "Your Ouija board experiment is rather fun. You see how very satisfactory it is, but I believe things improve greatly with practice. I think you should keep to one angel, and make the magical preparations more elaborate."

Over the years, both became so fascinated by the board that they discussed marketing their own design.

Charles Stansfeld Jones wrote a book called Crystal Vision through Crystal Gazing, in which he notes that in relationship to skrying (also spelled scrying) "the case of the Ouija Board applies equally to the Crystal."

== Work in O.T.O. ==
Inspired by the fifth point of the Task of a Zelator in the A∴A∴ system, Jones sought from Crowley the authority to begin O.T.O. initiatory work in Canada. The result was the first operation of the Mysteria Mystica Maxima degrees in North America, and the founding of British Columbia Lodge No. 1, where the original founders of Agape Lodge were first initiated.

Baphomet (Aleister Crowley) awarded Jones all O.T.O. degrees through the Seventh expedentiae causa in 1915. Jones was not given the IX° until he demonstrated a knowledge of the Supreme Secret of the Sovereign Sanctuary of the Gnosis in correspondence with Crowley. On his admission to the Ninth Degree, Jones took the magical name Parzival.

Jones became Grand Treasurer General after Crowley removed George Macnie Cowie from the post in 1918. Crowley and Jones soon came to disagreement about the management of Order funds, and Jones resigned from O.T.O. altogether in 1918. Crowley did not accept Jones' resignation, however, and Jones was eventually made Grand Master (X°) for North America by Theodor Reuss. Jones and the German initiate Heinrich Traenker were the Grand Masters who confirmed Crowley in his succession to the office of Outer Head of the O.T.O. in 1925.

Jones' organizing interests were never fired by O.T.O. after the early work of British Columbia Lodge. At Crowley's later request, Jones resigned from the office of National Grand Master General. Although Crowley formally expelled Jones from the Order in 1936, Jones nevertheless considered himself "Past Grand Master for the United States of America" until his death.

== Involvement in U.B. ==
In 1921, Jones joined the Universal Brotherhood (U.B.), also known to its members as the Integral Fellowship or as the Mahacakra Society (or M.), depending on their level of participation. This group had been actively recruiting among Theosophists for a decade or more, and Jones was one of a number of prominent Thelemites who eventually joined.

The methods of the U.B. involved one-to-one correspondence, with an elaborate set of rules regarding strict secrecy of instructions, envelopes-within-envelopes, purple typewriter ribbons, and special paperclips. Aspirants were provided with typescript lectures ("sutras") on metaphysical topics, using idiosyncratic terms like "integrality" and "partitivity." A system of alms provided for funds to be remitted back up the same chain down which these instructions descended. Organizational titles and pseudonyms in the U.B. were generally taken from Sanskrit. Few U.B. writings have become accessible to non-members, but those that have, taken with Jones' writings in the U.B. vein, suggest that their doctrines involved a baroquely intellectualized form of sentimental monotheism.

In 1924, Jones was superintending about 70 members of U.B., and he formed a plan for subsuming Thelema into the U.B. as a Grama or "Integral Body," which would perpetuate some O.T.O. and A∴A∴ materials "in their pure form." He communicated this idea to Wilfred T. Smith, who was at that time his subordinate in both the U.B. and A∴A∴, but Smith's interest in the U.B. was slight and waning.

Annie Besant, as head of the Theosophical Society, strictly forbade cross-membership in the U.B. As Crowley became aware of the involvement of his followers, he likewise denounced the U.B., calling it a "swindle" in correspondence with Jones. Many of those who left the Theosophical Society for the U.B. under pressure from Besant later converted to Roman Catholicism.

In 1928, Jones himself became a Roman Catholic, undergoing baptism and confirmation into the laity of that church. At roughly the same time, he succeeded to the U.B. office of Mahaguru, thus becoming the chief of that organization. Jones continued to hold that office, apparently until his death. Jones was succeeded as Mahaguru by John P. Kowal (1900–1978).

The true aims of the U.B. remain obscure, but it has been accused by Wilfred Talbot Smith, among others, of acting as a front for Roman Catholic infiltration of occult groups; and by former member Paul Foster Case of being inspired by the Bavarian Illuminati. Mahaguru John P. Kowal told Martin Starr that its purpose was "to make men think".

== Rumors of insanity and imprisonment ==
In late 1917 Jones was arrested in a Vancouver, British Columbia, Canada hotel, where he had been behaving erratically. He was imprisoned on suspicion of being a draft dodger who was pretending to be insane. He was released after three days.

Kenneth Grant, writing in The Magical Revival, claims that on Jones' return to Vancouver circa 1930, he was wearing only a raincoat, which he proceeded to throw off, and then circumambulated the center of the city as a magical operation of some sort, was arrested, and had a stay in a mental institution. This story, which Grant may have heard directly from Crowley, is in all likelihood a confusion of the 1917 incident with the "insanity" of Jones' 1928 baptism and 1929 confirmation in the Roman Catholic Church.

== Personal life ==
Jones' wife, whom he married in England prior to moving to the US and then Canada, was Prudence Rubina Stansfeld Jones née Wratton (1887–1981), often known as 'Ruby' or sometimes as 'Prue.' According to Crowley associate C. F. Russell, Jones met her in a brothel. Their adopted daughter was Deirdre Georgina Stansfeld Jones, known familiarly as Dede. (1912–1969). Like most members of Jones' British Columbia Lodge No 1 of the O.T.O., Ruby Jones advanced to the Third Degree (III^{0}) in 1915. They raised an adopted son, and Ruby took in many foster children over the years. Since both Charles and Rubina had joined the Catholic Church in 1929, the children were raised Catholic. According to Tony Stansfeld Jones, the parents held Catholic masses in their Deep Cove, North Vancouver home for many years, later holding them in a local community hall. The novelist Malcolm Lowry who lived in the community of Maplewood Flats (now Maplewood Flats Conservation Area) north of Vancouver from 1938–1944 was a close friend of the family and C S Jones helped him with his manuscripts.

In 1950, C. S. Jones developed pneumonia after catching cold while waiting for a bus, and died within three days.

== Works ==
After two of his pieces had been published in Crowley's journal The Equinox, Jones self-published his book Q.B.L., and then wrote several books that were issued through William Walker Atkinson's Yogi Publication Society of Chicago. Jones self-published others with a "Collegium ad Spiritum Sanctum, Publications Department" imprint. Many of his writings remained unpublished on his death.

Published writings:

- "A Master of the Temple, Liber CLXXV" (issued in The Equinox III:1, a.k.a. the "Blue" Equinox) This text is the published form of Jones' earliest magical records, with commentary by Crowley.
- "Stepping Out of the Old Aeon and into the New" (also in the "Blue" Equinox), a short homily on Thelema and solar consciousness.
- Thirty-one Hymns to the Star Goddess who is Not, by XII who is Achad, Chicago: Will Ransom 1923. A monograph consisting of elegant meditations on Liber Legis. Publisher Will Ransom was the illustrator of The Anatomy of the Body of God.
- Q.B.L., or The Bride's Reception, Chicago: Collegium ad Spiritum Sanctum, 1922. The first of Achad's major qabalistic works. His radical reassignment of the attributions of the paths is first intimated in an appendix to this book.
- Crystal Vision through Crystal Gazing, Chicago: Yogi Publication Society, 1923. An instructional text on scrying.
- The Chalice of Ecstasy, Chicago: Yogi Publication Society, 1923.A study of the symbolism of Wagner's Parsifal, in Thelemic terms. The book includes long passages quoted from Crowley's work and a set of original qabalistic interpretations.
- The Egyptian Revival: or the Ever-Coming Son in the Light of the Tarot. Chicago: Collegium ad Spiritum Sanctum, 1923. Explores and details the qabalistic revisionism first suggested in Q.B.L.
- The Anatomy of the Body of God, Chicago: Collegium ad Spiritum Sanctum, 1925. Jones' third major qabalistic text, following Q.B.L. and The Egyptian Revival.
- De Mysteriis Rosae Rubeae et Aureae Crucis, an analysis of magical formulae of the Adeptus Minor grade in A.'.A.'.
- Liber Thirty-one (published posthumously). Edited by T. Allen Greenfield. Atlanta: Luxor Press, 1998. A magical record detailing Jones' initiation(s) in the Third Order of A.'.A.'., and providing a great deal of original interpretation of Liber Legis.

Unpublished writings include:

- "The Alpha and Omega of Initiation", summarizing Jones' appreciation of the O.T.O. and A.'.A.'. systems.
- " A Master of the Temple, part two (previously and currently projected for publication by O.T.O. in The Equinox III:2)

Most of Charles Stansfeld Jones' papers are in private hands.

== See also ==
- Aleister Crowley bibliography
