= List of Thelemites =

Thelema is a philosophical and mystical system founded by Aleister Crowley early in the 20th century. This is a list of Thelemites, self-professed adherents of Thelema (including those who identified as Thelemites during part of their lives but subsequently left the faith) who have Wikipedia articles. These individuals come from diverse backgrounds, including artists, writers, occultists, scientists, musicians, and more, hailing from countries such as the United States, England, Canada, Germany, Australia, and Brazil.

== A ==
- Kenneth Anger (1927–2023), American underground experimental filmmaker, actor, and writer.

== B ==
- Frank Bennett (1868–1930), Australian chemist.
- William Breeze (b. 1955), American writer and musician.
- Mary Butts (1890–1937), English modernist writer.

== C ==
- Marjorie Cameron (1922–1995), American artist, poet, actress and occultist.
- Barbara Canright (1919–1997), American human computer at NASA's Jet Propulsion Laboratory, member of Agape Lodge.
- Aleister Crowley (1875–1947), English occultist, ceremonial magician, writer, and founder of Thelema.

== D ==
- Renate Druks (1921–2007), American painter and filmmaker.
- Lon Milo DuQuette (b. 1948), American writer, lecturer, musician, and occultist.

== E ==
- Sally Eaton (b. 1947), American Wiccan high priestess, liturgist, singer and actress.

== F ==
- Jeanne Robert Foster (1879–1970), American poet, occultist, and Theosophist; one of Aleister Crowley's "Scarlet Women"; took the magical name Soror Hilarion.
- J. F. C. Fuller (1878–1966), British military officer, Major-General in the British Army, and military historian and strategist; close confidant, major direct discipline and student, primary publicist, and first biographer of Aleister Crowley.

== G ==
- Peaches Geldof (1989–2014), English columnist, television personality, and model.
- Karl Germer (1885–1962), German and American businessman and occultist; O.H.O. (Frater Superior) of O.T.O., 1947–1962.
- Kenneth Grant (1924–2011), English ceremonial magician and advocate of Thelema; founder of the Typhonian Order and the Typhonian "current" of Thelema.
- Eugen Grosche (Gregor A. Gregorius) (1888–1964), German occultist and founder of the magical order Fraternitas Saturni; one of the earliest non-O.T.O. affiliated and 'independent' Thelemites.
- J. Daniel Gunther (1950–2024), American writer on Thelema, mystical philosophy, and esotericism; prominent 21st-century ceremonial magickian.

== H ==
- Lady Frieda Harris (1877–1962), English artist known for her design of Crowley's Thoth Tarot.
- Leah Hirsig (1883–1975), American schoolteacher and occultist, most famous of Crowley's Scarlet Women.
- Christopher Hyatt (1943–2008), American psychologist, occultist, and writer.

== J ==
- Charles Stansfeld Jones (1886–1950), Canadian occultist and ceremonial magician.
- George Cecil Jones (1873–1960), English chemist, occultist, Golden Dawn member and co-founder of the A∴A∴.

== K ==
- Richard Kaczynski (b. 1963), American occult writer and psychologist.

== L ==
- James Lees (1939–2015), English magician known for English Qaballa.

== M ==
- Grady Louis McMurtry (1918–1985), American ceremonial magician and "Caliph" of O.T.O.
- Marcelo Ramos Motta (1931–1987), Brazilian occult writer and member of A∴A∴

== N ==
- Nema Andahadna (1939–2018), American occultist, ceremonial magician, and writer of Liber Pennae Praenumbra.
- Victor Neuburg (1883–1940), English poet and writer.
- Noname Jane, American pornographic actress.
- Eric Nord (born Harry Helmuth Pastor; 1919–1989), American Beat Generation coffeehouse and nightclub owner, poet, actor, and hipster, the "King of the Beatniks".
- Sara Northrup Hollister (1924–1997), American occultist and second wife of Scientologist founder L. Ron Hubbard.

== P ==
- Jack Parsons (1914–1952), American rocket engineer, chemist, and occultist.
- Helen Parsons Smith (1910–2003), American occultist and book editor, wife of John "Jack" Whiteside Parsons who married Wilfred Talbot Smith after Parson's death.

== R ==
- C. F. Russell (1897–1987), American occultist and founder of the magical order G.B.G.
- Raul Seixas (1945-1989), Brazilian musician, also known for his song "Sociedade Alternativa" where he addresses the Thelema.

== S ==
- Phyllis Seckler (1917–2004), American occultist and writer, and a lineage holder in the A∴A∴ tradition.
- Harry Everett Smith (1923–1991), American polymath, artist, experimental filmmaker, bohemian, mystic, record collector, hoarder, student of anthropology and Neo-Gnostic bishop. (No relation to Helen P. Smith or Wilfred T. Smith.)
- Helen Parsons Smith (1910–2003), English occultist, ceremonial magician, editor, book publisher, and priestess of E.G.C.; wife of Wilfred T. Smith and ex-wife (widow) of Jack Parsons. (No relation to Harry E. Smith.)
- Wilfred Talbot Smith (1885–1957), English occultist and ceremonial magician. (No relation to Harry E. Smith.)

== W ==
- Leila Waddell (1880–1932), Australian violinist who became a Scarlet Woman of Aleister Crowley.
- James Wasserman (1948–2020), American writer and occultist.
- Sam Webster, American writer, publisher, co-founder of the Chthonic Auranian Templars of Thelema and OSOGD.
- Jane Wolfe (1875–1958), American silent film character actress.

== Former Thelemites ==
- Augustus Sol Invictus (b. 1983), American far-right political activist, attorney, blogger, and white nationalist. He has subsequently claimed to have reverted to Catholicism in 2022.

== See also ==
- Magical organization
- Members of Ordo Templi Orientis
