= Wilfred Talbot Smith =

English Thelemite (1885–1957)

- Born: Frank Wenham; 9 June 1885; Tonbridge, Kent, United Kingdom
- Died: 27 April 1957 (aged 71); Malibu, California, United States
- Occupation: Occultist
- Spouse: Helen Parsons Smith

Wilfred Talbot Smith (born Frank Wenham; 8 June 1885 – 27 April 1957) was an English occultist and ceremonial magician known as an advocate of the religion of Thelema. Living most of his life in North America, he played a key role in propagating Thelema across the continent.

Born the illegitimate son of a domestic servant and her employer in Tonbridge, Kent, Smith migrated to Canada in 1907, where he went through a variety of jobs and began reading about Western esotericism. Through Charles Stansfeld Jones he was introduced to the writings of Thelema's founder, Aleister Crowley. He subsequently joined Crowley's initiatory order, A∴A∴. In 1915, he joined the Vancouver-based British Columbia Lodge No. 1 of Ordo Templi Orientis (O.T.O.), and rose to become one of its senior members.

In 1922 Smith moved to Los Angeles in the United States, where he, Jane Wolfe, and Regina Kahl tried to establish a new Thelemite community. They founded an incorporated Church of Thelema which gave weekly public performances of the Gnostic Mass from their home in Hollywood. Seeking to revive the inactive North American O.T.O., in 1935 Smith then founded Agape Lodge of O.T.O., which subsequently relocated to Pasadena. He brought a number of prominent Thelemites into O.T.O., including Jack Parsons and Grady Louis McMurtry, but he had a strained relationship with both Crowley and Crowley's North American deputy, Karl Germer, who eventually ousted him from his position as Agape Lodge leader, replacing him with Parsons. Smith retreated to Malibu, where he continued to practice Thelema until his death.

== Early life ==
=== Youth: 1885–1914 ===
Smith was born as Frank Wenham in Tonbridge, Kent, on 9 June 1885. He was the illegitimate son of Oswald Cox, a member of a prominent local family who resided at Marl Field House, and one of his domestic servants, Minnie Wenham, whom Frank would never come to know. Considered an embarrassment by the wealthy Cox family, from an early age he was sent away to live with relatives, and aged four sent to a boarding school where he was physically abused by staff before being removed from the institution by his paternal grandmother, who took him for a year in Switzerland. From 1899 to 1901, he studied at Bedales School, where he developed his lifelong hobby of book binding, before becoming the apprentice to a cabinet maker in Kendal until 1906.

With few ties in Britain, he decided to emigrate to Canada, arriving in Nova Scotia in 1907, where he gained work on a farm in Saskatchewan. From 1909 to 1911 he worked at a confectioner's warehouse, and then for a further nine months at a logging camp, before gaining a job as an accounting clerk at the British Columbia Electric Railway in April 1912. He had come to loathe Christianity and the Victorian moral systems that he associated with it; instead he began reading about Eastern religion, yoga, and Western esotericism. While at work, he met Charles Stansfeld Jones, a Thelemite who shared Smith's interest in these subjects and who lent him copies of Aleister Crowley's Book 4 and volume one, number one of The Equinox. Intrigued, Smith paid to join Crowley's Britain-based magical order, A∴A∴, in doing so obtaining more of Crowley's writings. He began performing many of the practices encouraged by the group, including yoga and the keeping of a diary recording his magical endeavours.

Smith entered into a relationship with a woman twenty years his senior, Emily Sophia "Nem" Talbot Smith, although it remains unclear whether they ever married. With Nem and her daughter Katherine, Smith moved into a specially-constructed house designed by the Thelemite architect Howard E. White, located at 138 East 13th Street, North Vancouver. Smith converted its attic into a temple for Thelemic rituals.

=== O.T.O. British Columbia Lodge No. 1: 1915–1922 ===
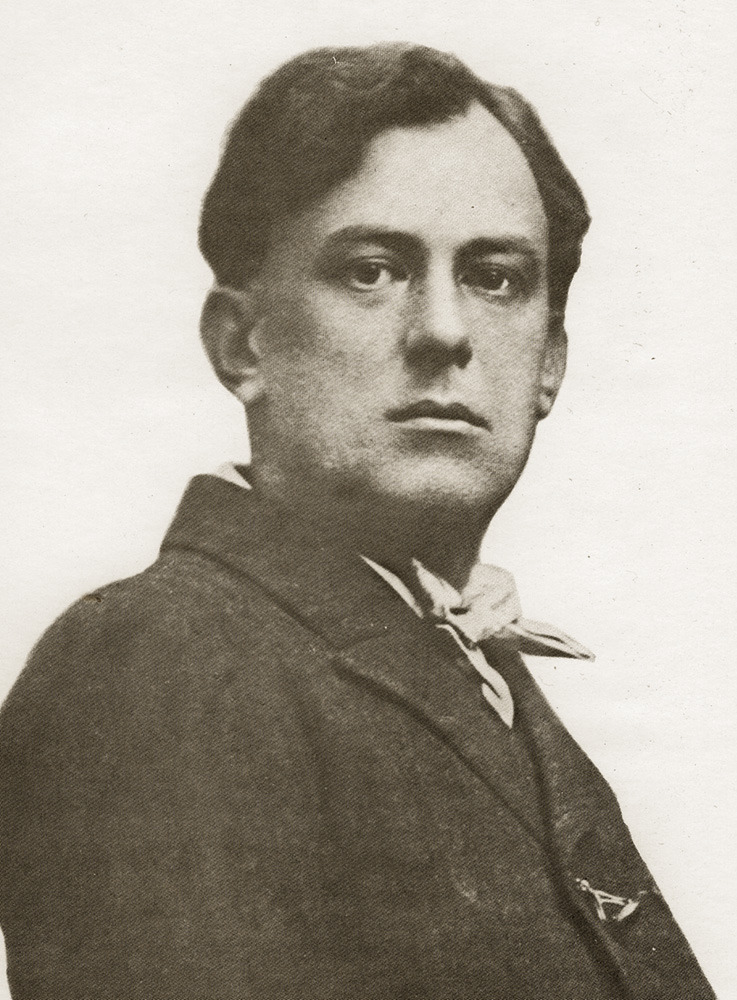
Crowley, of whom Smith became a devotee.

Smith also decided to join Ordo Templi Orientis (O.T.O.), an occult organization whose British branch, the Mysteria Magica Maxima (MMM), was run by Crowley, who used it to promote Thelema. In January 1915, Smith signed up to the MMM, and in April went through the Minerval degree initiation at the British Columbia Lodge No. 1. In May, he took part in the Lodge's public performance of a 'Rite of Isis' (composed by C.S. Jones assisted by H. E. White) which it was hoped would attract further members. In a private capacity, he meanwhile continued performing his A∴A∴ practices, and also began experimenting with the entheogenic properties of anhalonium. In October 1915, Crowley visited the Lodge, where he met with Smith. Soon after, Smith would be upgraded to the position of Master Magician within the Lodge, and in March 1916 received the Probationer level in the A∴A∴, adopting as his personal magical motto the Latin words Nubem Eripiam ("I will snatch away the cloud").

Smith's relationship with Nem was strained, and he began an affair with his step-daughter, Katherine. In November 1916, the three of them tried to resign from O.T.O. lodge so as to prevent their problems from affecting the group. Their resignations were rejected, and by January 1917 they were once again active within the lodge. Nevertheless, in March the lodge shut down for 13 months, during which time Crowley and Jones scrutinized Smith's diaries to ascertain his magical progress. Katherine became pregnant with Smith's child, who was born in December 1917, and named Noel Talbot-Smith. Jones proclaimed that Noel represented "the Crowned and Conquering Child" prophesied in the main Thelemite holy book, The Book of the Law. Jones was soon named O.T.O. Viceroy for Canada, and in April he re-initiated the lodge at Smith's home, with Smith himself being appointed the lodge's Right Worshipful Master. Jones himself claimed that he had undergone a "Great Initiation" and was now an Ipsissimus; his relationship with Crowley broke down, and he subsequently resigned from O.T.O., deeply disappointing Smith.

Smith meanwhile continued working towards the A∴A∴ grade of Zelator, while the British Columbia Lodge No. 1 became increasingly moribund following the death of White, a key member, who had succumbed to Spanish flu aged 33 in November 1918. Jones had rejoined O.T.O. and relocated to Detroit in the United States. When Smith was fired from his job following a bout of flu in February 1920, he decided to join Jones in Detroit, where there was a small O.T.O. community; there he gained work as a clerk with the Detroit City Gas Company. In Jones' absence, Nem was appointed Right Worshipful Master of the Vancouver lodge. In March 1921, Jones and Smith proceeded to Chicago, but in June Smith returned to North Vancouver to see his family. That year, Jones convinced Smith to join an esoteric organization known as the Universal Brotherhood (UB). Smith however was unnerved that rather than expressing a Thelemic viewpoint, the UB adhered to Roman Catholicism, and he also considered its literature purposeless, vague, and grandiose; he soon dropped out. Back in Vancouver, Smith aided one of his initiates, Frank Page, in founding the British Columbia Lodge No. 3 in Kamloops, creating all the furniture for their temple. Nevertheless, the lodge closed after a year, with Smith's own British Columbia Lodge No. 1 also becoming defunct in February 1922.

=== Los Angeles: 1922–1935 ===
Unable to find work in Vancouver, Smith headed to Los Angeles in California, United States. On the way he stopped at San Francisco, where he met with Cecil Frederick Russell, a Thelemite who had departed from the Crowleyan orthodoxy to found his own group, the Choronzon Club. Smith however disliked Russell, and later claimed that he had been unnerved when Russell began expressing a sexual interest in children. After settling in Los Angeles, Smith gained a job at the Southern California Gas Company, entered into a relationship with a woman named Ann Barry, and began attending occasional meetings of the United Lodge of Theosophists, an esoteric organisation centred in the city. Jones meanwhile had united Thelema with auto-suggestion to found his own group, the Psychomagian Society (PMS), and he appointed Smith to be its Local Recorder for Los Angeles; out of friendship to Jones, Smith did so, but was uninterested in the PMS' teachings. Through their correspondences, Crowley came to reject the PMS and relations between himself and Jones once again broke down, this time permanently. Smith retained much affection for Jones, whom he saw as his mentor and friend, but nevertheless agreed with Crowley over the PMS and also rejected Jones' ongoing fascination with the UB, which Smith considered incompatible with Thelema; their relationship too came to an end in 1926.

Now based in Los Angeles, Smith applied for US citizenship but was rejected, due to the fact that in his application he had claimed to be married but he was unable to prove this with paperwork. Seeking to promote Thelema in the city, he adopted his own student, Oliver Jacobi, whom he mentored in the A∴A∴ system, and in the autumn of 1927, he developed a close friendship with fellow Thelemite and Hollywood actress Jane Wolfe. Although he continued to have sexual relationships with other women, Smith retained his love for Katherine, who came to visit him in Los Angeles, where they were legally married on 24 August 1927 at the Forest Lawn Memorial Park in Glendale, the day before she returned to Montreal. She tried to get Smith to abandon occultism and Thelema and return to her in Canada, but he refused, leading her to file for divorce in May 1930, taking sole custody of their child. Smith continued to have sexual and romantic relationships with other women, and – influenced by Crowley's bisexuality – also experimented with same-sex sexual relations, but felt no attraction to men. From July to September 1929, a married woman named Leota Schneider moved in with Smith, and they had an affair, but she soon returned to her husband, while from July to December 1930, Smith began undertaking sex magic rituals with Wolfe, although their relationship remained platonic. Smith soon met Regina Kahl and her sister Leona "Lee" Watson, whom he initiated into O.T.O. in early 1931, with Regina also joining the A∴A∴. Smith had sexual relations with both sisters, but while Regina – with whom his activity became sadomasochistic – became romantically attached to him, Lee soon abandoned Thelema.

In 1932, Crowley, now based back in England, fell seriously ill, and believing his death to be immanent, he sent Smith a testament proclaiming that in the event of his death, Smith would become Frater Superior and Outer Head of the Order (O.H.O.) of O.T.O.; he soon however recovered. In May of that year, Smith and Kahl began renting the large house at 1746 Winona Boulevard in Hollywood, and began to take in lodgers to help pay for it. Kahl and Wolfe began using the attic for Thelemic rituals, and in March 1933 they performed their first public Gnostic Mass in the room, hoping to attract interested persons to Thelema. Crowley was pleased with their progress, and asked them to raise funds so that he could afford to visit. The weekly performances of the Gnostic Mass began to attract increasingly large crowds, with their "Crowley Nights" attracting around 150 guests, among them the film star John Carradine. In April 1934, Smith incorporated the Church of Thelema under US law, although retained the North American O.T.O. as an unincorporated secret society. Crowley however was confused, and believed that Smith had incorporated O.T.O., something which angered him; he subsequently complained about Smith in letters to other initiates. After an argument, Crowley and Smith ceased correspondence for a time. Smith also attempted to revive the largely defunct North American O.T.O., attracting 15 initial initiates, many of whom were dissatisfied members of the Choronzon Club, which was now in decline.

== Later life ==
=== O.T.O. Agape Lodge: 1935–1944 ===
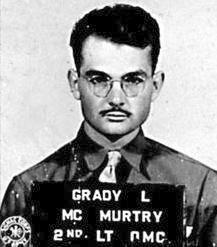
Grady McMurtry was an early Lodge member. He later became head of O.T.O.

With O.T.O. now being revived in North America, Smith founded the Agape Lodge No. 1, based at his Hollywood home, and brought in 7 initiates to the Minerval level in September 1935. He advertised the foundation of his group through an advert in American Astrology magazine and printed a pamphlet explaining what O.T.O. was. The Agape Lodge held regular meetings, lectures, and study classes, as well as social events and a weekly Gnostic Mass open to the public. In February 1936 they held a Mass in honour of Wayne Walker, a proponent of New Thought who ran a group known as The Voice of Healing; they had hoped to attract Walker and his supporters to Thelema, but they were put off by the Lodge's sexual openness. Later that year, Smith and Oliver Jacobi's employer, the Southern California Gas Company, discovered their involvement in the Lodge, demoting Smith to bookkeeper and firing Jacobi. Angered, Jacobi left the Lodge altogether, while Smith shut down the group's private ritual activities for the next three years. As a result, the public attendance of the Gnostic Mass plummeted.

Activities picked up again when Kahl, who worked as a drama teacher, brought three of her interested students into the group, among them Phyllis Seckler, and other individuals also joined the group, among them Louis T. Culling and Roy Leffingwell. However, the rising number of members caused schisms and arguments, and the Lodge again ceased its private activities from March 1940 to March 1941. They returned to their activities to initiate a couple who had become interested in O.T.O. through attending the Gnostic Mass, rocket scientist Jack Parsons and his wife Helen. Parsons became enamored with Thelema, although initially expressed both "repulsion and attraction" for Smith. Smith wrote to Crowley, claiming that Parsons was "a really excellent man ... He has an excellent mind and much better intellect than myself ... JP is going to be very valuable". The Parsons would help bring new members into the group; Grady McMurtry and his fiancée Claire Palmer, and Helen's sister Sara Northrup. In February 1939 a young college student who had attended the mass, Ayna Sosoyena, was murdered; although police drew no connection to the Lodge, sensationalist local tabloids connected the two, although were unaware that the Lodge was involved with Crowley or Thelema. A sympathetic local radio reporter allowed Smith to explain the purpose of the Mass to allay fears of the group, but the interview was never aired in an agreement with local press that they would drop the story.

By this point, the Agape Lodge was fully operational once more, although Crowley had remained highly critical of Smith, believing that he was failing to raise sufficient funds for Crowley's personal use. He appointed Karl Germer, a German Thelemite recently arrived in the US, to be his representative on the continent, and instructed Germer to oversee the payment of dues to himself. He also specified that it would now be Germer, and not Smith, who was his chosen successor. Attempting to placate Crowley, in December 1941 Smith stated that all Lodge members now had to contribute 5% of their earnings as an "Emergency Fee" that went to Crowley. Crowley's criticisms nevertheless continued, and Smith suffered a mild heart attack, retiring prematurely from work at the age of 56 before undergoing an operation to remove haemorroids in February 1942.

Smith decided to relocate Agape Lodge to a larger premises, renting the large house at 1003 South Orange Grove Avenue in Pasadena from June 1942 for $100 a month, moving many of the lodge members into the house, living as a form of commune and raising livestock and vegetables in the grounds. Parsons had begun a relationship with Sara Northrup, while Smith consoled Helen, who would become his partner for the rest of his life; nevertheless the four remained friends. Although they had ceased to publicly perform the Gnostic Mass, membership of the lodge continued to grow. A number of prominent members however left, among them Regina Kahl and Phyllis Seckler. Soon, both the FBI and the Pasadena police department began to investigate O.T.O. and Agape Lodge, particularly as Germer, now leader of the North American O.T.O., was German; ultimately, they decided that the group was no threat to national security, describing it as a probable "love cult". Crowley however had remained highly critical of Smith's leadership of the lodge, and ordered Wolfe to send him on a personal magical retreat; she felt conflicted, but eventually conceded to Crowley's demands. Both Crowley and Germer wanted to see Smith ousted permanently, believing that he had become a bad influence on the other lodge members; many of the members, including Jack and Helen Parsons, wrote to them to defend their mentor, but Germer nevertheless ordered him to stand down, with Parsons appointed head of the lodge.

In April, Helen gave birth to Smith's son, who was named Kwen Lanval Parsons. In May, Smith and Helen left for a two-room cabin in Rainbow Valley with their baby, where Smith undertook his magical retirement. Back in England, Crowley undertook an astrological analysis of Smith's birth chart, and came to the conclusion that he was the incarnation of a god, greatly altering his estimation of him; Smith however remained sceptical. Refusing to take orders from Germer any more, Smith resigned from O.T.O., while Parsons – who remained sympathetic and friendly to Smith during the conflict – ceased lodge activities and resigned as its head. In a letter informing Crowley of this decision, Smith remarked "Would to God you knew your people better." Germer subsequently appointed Max Schneider head of the Agape Lodge, which remained inactive, while Crowley, Germer, and Schneider began spreading lies about Smith, including that he was responsible for raping initiates, claims that were denied by many Lodge members.

=== Final years: 1944–1957 ===
In September 1944 Smith went on a second magical retirement, during which he performed pranayama and the lesser banishing ritual of the pentagram, invoked Thoth, and recited the Holy Books of Thelema from memory. During the retreat he learned that Kahl, his former lover, had died, which greatly upset him. Returning to his Pasadena home, he was welcomed by Parsons, but Crowley insisted that Smith be shunned by the lodge members, and so he moved back to Hollywood. Increasingly alienated by Crowley's attitude, Parsons resigned from O.T.O. in August 1946. Now renting a house, Smith sought out various handyman jobs, when he learned that Crowley had died and been succeeded as O.H.O. of O.T.O. by Germer. He became good friends with the art dealer Baron Ernst von Harringa, who commissioned Smith to construct Asian-style furniture for his gallery. Smith's own health was deteriorating, and in 1948 he suffered from a number of mild heart attacks. He nevertheless continued to believe in Thelema, and hoped to revive the Church of Thelema through performing the Gnostic Mass once more. Following Parsons' death in an explosion – which Smith suspected was a case of suicide – Smith was invited to perform the Gnostic Mass in his memory.

Although they had long disliked each other, Germer recognised that Smith was the only living individual with a good practical knowledge of O.T.O. degree system, and so put him in contact with Kenneth Grant, who was then trying to revive O.T.O. in London. Smith and Germer would only meet in person for the first time in June 1956, when the latter was visiting California, and soon after Germer introduced him to young Brazilian Thelemite Marcelo Ramos Motta, who would later grow to despise Smith. Smith purchased a plot of land in Malibu where he built his own house for himself, Helen, and their son, which he named "Hoc Id Est" ("This Is It"). Construction was interrupted in February 1955 when he underwent surgery for an enlarged prostate. This developed into prostate cancer, and mistrusting of conventional medicine, he sought out an alternative treatment at the Hoxsey Clinic in Dallas, Texas, which he visited in December 1956, but they were unable to help him. Smith died as a result of the disease at home on 27 April 1957, subsequently being cremated at the Grandview Memorial Park in Glendale.

== Legacy and influence ==
The Unknown God was reviewed by Robert Ellwood of the University of Southern California for the peer-reviewed journal Nova Religio: The Journal of Alternative and Emergent Religions. Ellwood described it as "the definitive work on American Crowleyanity", noting that it was the product of 15 years of "careful and documented" research. He praised "Starr's lucid style and the inherent fascination of the material, replete with vivid characters, epic rows, and sexual intrigue".

== See also ==
- List of Thelemites
- Members of Ordo Templi Orientis
