= Frank Bennett (occultist) =

- Born: 1868; Worsley, Lancashire, England
- Died: 1 November 1930 (aged 62)
- Other name: Frater Progradior
- Occupations: Chemist, occultist
- Organization(s): Ordo Templi Orientis (O.T.O.), A∴A∴
- Known for: Disciple of Aleister Crowley, head of O.T.O. in Australia
- Notable work: The Magical Record of Frater Progradior
- Movement: Thelema

Frank Bennett (1868 – November 1930) was an Australian chemist who was a disciple of occultist Aleister Crowley a member and later head of Ordo Templi Orientis (O.T.O.) in that country. He was a member of Crowley's A∴A∴ and is often referred to by one of the magical names that he used in that Order: Frater Progradior. (Progradior is an approximation of the Latin for "I advance".)

== Early life ==
Bennett was born in Worsley, Lancashire, England. He worked variously as a builder, industrial chemist, and factory manager, and in later life, as a caretaker and maintenance supervisor. During his earlier years he was involved in a number of esoteric movements, including the Theosophical Society and Universal Co-Freemasonry (now known as Co-Masonry: a mixed-sex version of Freemasonry).

He got in touch with Crowley in 1909 through The Equinox newsletter, asking for information on the Abramelin operation.

== Career ==
Not long after, he joined Crowley’s A∴A∴ and later O.T.O. In spite of his interest in Crowley, Bennett kept his ties with Co-Masonry and in 1911 emigrated to Australia, with the specific purpose of assisting in the foundation of Co-Masonic Lodges, a task he undertook with some success. He eventually settled in Sydney, where he was joined by his wife and children. Frank Bennett’s interest in Co-Masonry waned, and he resigned from the Sydney Lodge, of which he was Past Grand Master, after a dispute over its management.

In 1914 he renewed contact with O.T.O. and after lengthy negotiations he received a charter to run the first O.T.O. Lodge in Australia in November 1915. The lodge was named "Sydney Rosicrucian Lodge," and for technical reasons was listed as "Lodge No. 2 on the Register of the National Grand Council of Ordo Templi Orientis for the Union of South Africa".

Throughout the years of the First World War Bennett sought to grow O.T.O. and A∴A∴ in Australia, holding regular lectures which he advertised in newspapers. He corresponded regularly with Crowley and Frater Achad (Charles Stansfeld Jones) who supervised his studies in the A∴A∴ It was as a Neophyte under Achad’s mentorship that he adopted the name "Progradior" – which would become the best known of his magical names.

In July 1921, Bennett traveled to the recently founded Abbey of Thelema in Cefalù where he began personal studies under Crowley. There he joined a small number of Thelemic luminaries including Leah Hirsig, Cecil Frederick Russell, Jane Wolfe, and others. Crowley was greatly impressed with Bennett’s enthusiasm and aptitude, and specifically rewrote an initiatory text: Liber Samekh, a ritual for attaining the Knowledge and Conversation of the Holy Guardian Angel, for Bennett to use during a magical retreat ("magical retirement.") Frank Bennett kept a detailed account of his experiences during this retreat which has since been published as The Magical Record of Frater Progradior.

Crowley was immensely impressed with Bennett’s achievements, and came to consider him a star pupil. He formally admitted Bennett to the Ninth Degree of O.T.O. and officially appointed him as his "Viceroy in Australasia." Crowley also advanced Bennett rapidly through the grades of the A∴A∴, with Bennett taking the Oath of an Adeptus Minor in October 1921.

== Personal life ==
When Frank Bennett returned to Australia in December 1921 he was ill with malaria and had also acquired a heroin addiction. He also returned to domestic troubles: his wife was on the verge of leaving him, and when she did so his son, Frank Bennett Jr. sided with her, and never reconciled with his father.

For a time Bennett lost contact with Crowley and the Thelemites, but eventually recommenced his correspondence with Crowley and his Scarlet Woman, Alostrael (Leah Hirsig) and renewed his attempts to spread Crowley’s teachings (the Law of Thelema). In 1924 a Sydney newspaper, Smith's Weekly, ran a series of scandalous exposés on Bennett and O.T.O. Under pressure from family, and afraid of losing his job, Bennett withdrew from the public gaze, and the Sydney O.T.O. and A∴A∴ groups – which had probably only ever attracted a tiny membership - appear to have dissolved. Following the closure of the Abbey of Thelema in Cefalù Aleister Crowley, Leah Hirsig and the other members of the small core group of Thelemites dispersed, and Frank Bennett slowly drifted out of contact with them.

== Death ==
Bennett died in November 1930, after a short illness.

== Works ==
A collection of Frank Bennett’s writings, including his "Magical Record" has been published, and he is also the subject of the full-length biographical study Progradior and the Beast. Bennett’s correspondence with Aleister Crowley and others in his circle has also been published as The Progradior Correspondence.

- Aleister Crowley, Frank Bennett; Charles Stansfeld Jones; et al. The Progradior Correspondence, Letters by Aleister Crowley, Frank Bennett, C. Stansfeld Jones, & Others. Edited and Introduced by Keith Richmond. York Beach, Maine USA: Teitan Press, 2009
- Frank Bennett, The Magical Record of Frater Progradior & Other Writings by Frank Bennett. Edited and Introduced by Keith Richmond. London: Neptune Press, 2004.
- Keith Richmond, Progradior and the Beast: Frank Bennett & Aleister Crowley. London: Neptune Press, 2004.
