= Agape Lodge =

American occult lodge, 1935–1949

Lodge founder Wilfred Talbot Smith

The Agape Lodge was an American chapter of Ordo Templi Orientis founded in California in 1935 by Wilfred Talbot Smith. Following World War II, it was the sole surviving O.T.O. organization. The O.T.O. itself traced its origins back to Carl Kellner and underwent leadership changes until Aleister Crowley took over in 1925. In 1935, Smith established the Agape Lodge No. 2 in Hollywood, attracting initiates through advertising and hosting regular meetings, lectures, and social events, including a Gnostic Mass open to the public.

The lodge faced challenges in 1936 when Smith and another member faced consequences at their workplace due to their involvement, leading to a temporary shutdown of private ritual activities. The lodge experienced growth in 1939 with the initiation of Jack Parsons, a jet fuel engineer, and his wife Helen. However, tensions arose within the lodge, including a murder accusation in 1939, leading to negative publicity.

In 1941, conflicts intensified with the entry of Helen's sister Sara Northrup, who had an affair with Jack Parsons, causing a rift between sisters and further disrupting the lodge's harmony. The lodge moved to Pasadena in 1942 and faced scrutiny from law enforcement agencies due to allegations of a "black magic cult." Crowley and Karl Germer criticized Smith's leadership, leading to Jack Parsons taking over as the head of the lodge in 1942.

In 1945, L. Ron Hubbard became involved with the lodge, and a controversial business venture ensued in 1946, resulting in financial loss and legal disputes. Parsons, facing personal and financial turmoil, ultimately sold the Parsonage, and the Agape Lodge ceased regular meetings in 1949.

== Background ==
The original O.T.O. was founded by the wealthy Austrian industrialist Carl Kellner. After Kellner's death in 1905, Theodor Reuss became Outer Head of the Order. After Reuss's death in 1923, Aleister Crowley was elected Head of the Order in 1925.

In 1915, the lesser-known Agapé Lodge No. 1 of Vancouver, B.C. was established.

== Hollywood: 1935 to 1936 ==
In 1935, Wilfred Talbot Smith founded the Agape Lodge No. 2, based at his Hollywood home at 1746 Winona Boulevard (now demolished), and brought in seven initiates to the Minerval level in September 1935. Smith advertised the foundation of his group through an advert in American Astrology magazine and printed a pamphlet explaining what the O.T.O. was. The Agape Lodge held regular meetings, lectures, and study classes, as well as social events and a weekly Gnostic Mass open to the public.

In February 1936, the lodge held a Mass in honour of New Thought leader Wayne Walker who ran a group called "The Voice of Healing"; The Agape Lodge members hoped to attract Walker and his supporters to Thelema, but they were put off by the Lodge's sexual openness. Later in 1936, Smith and Jacobi's employer, the Southern California Gas Company, discovered their involvement in the Lodge, demoting Smith to bookkeeper and firing Jacobi. Angered, Jacobi left the Lodge altogether, while Smith shut down the group's private ritual activities for the next three years. As a result, the public attendance of the Gnostic Mass plummeted.

== Hollywood: 1939 to March 1940 ==
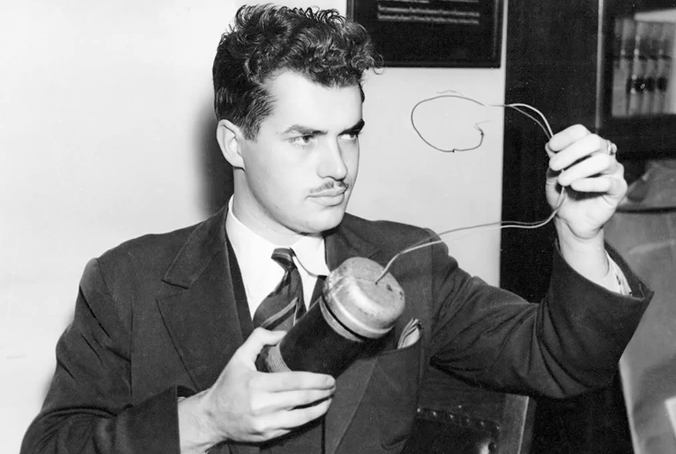
Jack Parsons in 1938

In 1939, the group initiated Jack Parsons, a jet fuel engineer, and his wife Helen, who had become interested in the O.T.O. through attending the Gnostic Mass. Smith wrote to Crowley that Parsons was "a really excellent man ... He has an excellent mind and much better intellect than myself ... JP is going to be very valuable". The Parsons would help bring new members into the group Grady McMurtry and his fiancée Claire Palmer, and Helen's sister Sara Northrup.

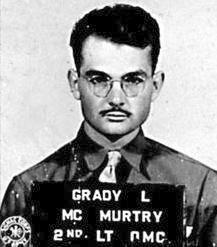
Grady McMurtry was an early Lodge member. He later became head of the O.T.O..

February 1939

In February 1939, a young college student who had attended the mass, Ayna Sosoyena, was murdered; although police drew no connection to the Lodge, sensationalist local tabloids connected the two, although were unaware that the Lodge was involved with Crowley or Thelema. A sympathetic local radio reporter allowed Smith to explain the purpose of the Mass to allay fears of the group, but the interview was never aired in an agreement with local press that they would drop the story.

Crowley appointed Karl Germer, a German Thelemite recently arrived in the US, to be his representative on the continent, and instructed Germer to oversee the payment of dues to himself. He also specified that it would now be Germer, and not Smith, who was his chosen successor.

Regina Kahl, who worked as a drama teacher, brought three of her interested students into the group, among them Phyllis Seckler, and other individuals also joined the group, among them Louis T. Culling and Roy Leffingwell.

The Lodge again ceased its private activities from March 1940 to March 1941.

=== Sara Northrup joins, 1941 ===
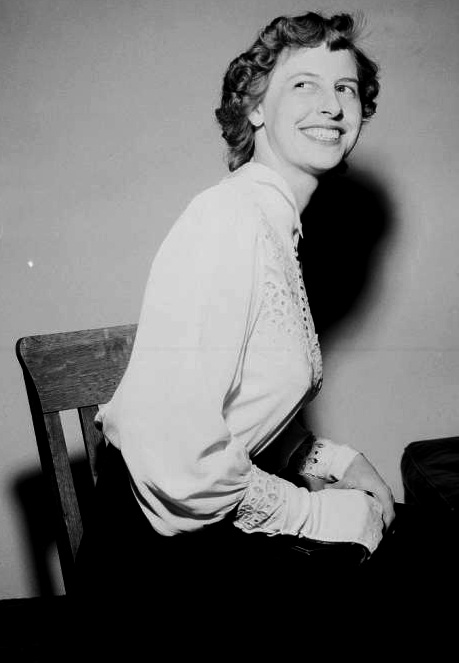
Sara Northrup, younger sister of Helen Parsons

Sara Northrup joined the O.T.O. in 1941, at Parsons' urging, and was given the title of Soror [Sister] Cassap. She soon rose to the rank of a second degree member, or "Magician", of the O.T.O.

In June 1941, at the age of seventeen, Northrup began a passionate affair with Parsons while her sister Helen was away on vacation. She made a striking impression on the other lodgers.

When Helen returned, she found Northrup wearing Helen's own clothes and calling herself Parsons' "new wife." Such conduct was expressly permitted by the O.T.O., which followed Crowley's disdain of marriage as a "detestable institution" and accepted as commonplace the swapping of wives and partners between O.T.O. members.

Although both were committed O.T.O. members, Northrup's usurpation of Helen's role led to conflict between the two sisters. The reactions of Parsons and Helen towards Northrup were markedly different. Parsons told Helen to her face that he preferred Northrup sexually: "This is a fact that I can do nothing about. I am better suited to her temperamentally – we get on well. Your character is superior. You are a greater person. I doubt that she would face what you have with me – or support me as well." Some years later, addressing himself as "You", Parsons told himself that his affair with Northrup (whom he called Betty) marked a key step in his growth as a practitioner of magick: "Betty served to affect a transference from Helen at a critical period ... Your passion for Betty also gave you the magical force needed at the time, and the act of adultery tinged with incest, served as your magical confirmation in the law of Thelema." Conflicted in her feelings, Helen sought comfort in Smith and began a relationship with him that lasted for the rest of his life; the four remained friends.

Northrup's hostility towards other members of the O.T.O. caused further tensions in the house, which Aleister Crowley heard about from communications from her housemates. He dubbed her "the alley-cat" after an unnamed mutual acquaintance told him that Parsons's attraction to her was like "a yellow pup bumming around with his snout glued to the rump of an alley-cat." Concluding that she was a vampire, which he defined as "an elemental or demon in the form of a woman" who sought to "lure the Candidate to his destruction," he warned that Northrup was a grave danger to Parsons and to the "Great Work" which the O.T.O. was carrying out in California.

Similar concerns were expressed by other O.T.O. members. The O.T.O.'s US head, Karl Germer, labeled her "an ordeal sent by the gods". Her disruptive behavior appalled Fred Gwynn, a new O.T.O. member living in the commune at 1003 South Orange Blvd: "Betty went to almost fantastical lengths to disrupt the meetings [of the O.T.O.] that Jack did get together. If she could not break it up by making social engagements with key personnel she, and her gang, would go out to a bar and keep calling in asking for certain people to come to the telephone."

== Relocation to Pasadena in June 1942 ==
In June 1942, a number of other Thelemites moved to 1003 South Orange Grove Blvd, an American Craftsman-style mansion. They all contributed to the rent of $100 a month and lived communally in what replaced Winona Boulevard as the new base of the Agape Lodge, maintaining an allotment and slaughtering their own livestock for meat as well as blood rituals. Parsons decorated his new room with a copy of the Stele of Revealing, a statue of Pan, and his collection of swords and daggers. He converted the garage and laundry room into a chemical laboratory and often held science fiction discussion meetings in the kitchen, and entertained the children with hunts for fairies in the 25-acre garden.

Parsons attracted controversy in Pasadena for his preferred clientele. Parsonage resident Alva Rogers recalled in a 1962 article for an occultist fanzine: "In the ads placed in the local paper Jack specified that only bohemians, artists, musicians, atheists, anarchists, or any other exotic types need to apply for rooms—any mundane soul would be unceremoniously rejected".

Some veteran Lodge members disliked Parsons' influence, concerned that it encouraged excessive sexual polyandry that was religiously detrimental, but his charismatic orations at Lodge meetings assured his popularity among the majority of followers. Parsons soon created the Thelemite journal Oriflamme, in which he published his own poetry, but Crowley was unimpressed—particularly due to Parsons' descriptions of drug use—and the project was soon shelved.

Although there were arguments among the commune members, Parsons remained dedicated to Thelema. He gave almost all of his salary to the O.T.O. while actively seeking out new members—including Forman—and financially supported Crowley in London through Germer. Parsons had begun a relationship with Sara Northrup, while Smith consoled Helen, who would become his partner for the rest of his life; nevertheless the four remained friends. Although they had ceased to publicly perform the Gnostic Mass, membership of the lodge continued to grow.

A number of prominent members however left, among them Regina Kahl and Phyllis Seckler.

=== Law enforcement concerns ===
Agape Lodge soon came under investigation by both the Pasadena Police Department and the FBI. Both had received allegations of a "black magic cult" involved in sexual orgies; one complainant was a 16-year-old boy who said that he was raped by lodge members, while neighbors reported a ritual involving a naked pregnant woman jumping through fire. Karl Germer, now leader of the North American O.T.O., was German. Neither agency found evidence of illegal activity and came to the conclusion that the Lodge constituted no threat to national security.

=== Parsons becomes head of the lodge ===
Crowley however had remained highly critical of Smith's leadership of the lodge, and ordered Wolfe to send him on a personal magical retreat; she felt conflicted, but eventually acceded to Crowley's demands. Both Crowley and Germer wanted to see Smith ousted permanently, believing that he had become a bad influence on the other lodge members; many of the members, including Jack and Helen Parsons, wrote to them to defend their mentor, but Germer nevertheless ordered him to stand down, with Parsons appointed head of the lodge.

In New York Jack Parsons met with Karl Germer, the head of the O.T.O. in North America.

In December 1941, Smith announced a policy that all Lodge members now had to contribute 5% of their earnings as an "Emergency Fee" that went to Crowley.

Around this time, Smith suffered a mild heart attack and retired at the age of 56 before undergoing an operation in February 1942.

Having been a long-term heavy user of alcohol and marijuana, Parsons now habitually used cocaine, amphetamines, peyote, mescaline, and opiates as well. Parsons continued to have sexual relations with multiple women, including McMurtry's fiancée Claire. When Parsons paid for her to have an abortion, McMurtry was angered and their friendship broke down.

Refusing to take orders from Germer any more, Smith resigned from the O.T.O., while Parsons—who remained sympathetic and friendly to Smith during the conflict—ceased lodge activities and resigned as its head. In a letter informing Crowley of this decision, Smith remarked, "Would to God you knew your people better."

Germer subsequently appointed Max Schneider head of the Agape Lodge, which remained inactive, while Crowley, Germer, and Schneider began spreading lies about Smith, including that he was responsible for raping initiates, claims that were denied by many Lodge members.

=== Parsons family ===
In April, Helen gave birth to Smith's son, who was named Kwan Lanval Parsons. In May, Smith and Helen left for a two-room cabin in Rainbow Valley with their baby, where Smith undertook his magical retirement. Back in England, Crowley undertook an astrological analysis of Smith's birth chart, and came to the conclusion that he was the incarnation of a god, greatly altering his estimation of him; Smith however remained sceptical.

Helen was far less sanguine, writing in her diary of "the sore spot I carried where my heart should be", and had furious—sometimes violent—rows with both Parsons and Northrup. She began an affair with Wilfred Smith, Parsons' mentor in the O.T.O. and had a son in 1943 who bore Parsons' surname but who was almost certainly fathered by Smith. Northrup also became pregnant but had an abortion on April 1, 1943, arranged by Parsons and carried out by Dr. Zachary Taylor Malaby, a prominent Pasadena doctor and Democratic politician.

Parsons continued to financially support Smith and Helen, although he asked for a divorce from her and ignored Crowley's commands by welcoming Smith back to the Parsonage when his retreat was finished.

== Arrival of L. Ron Hubbard in August 1945 ==
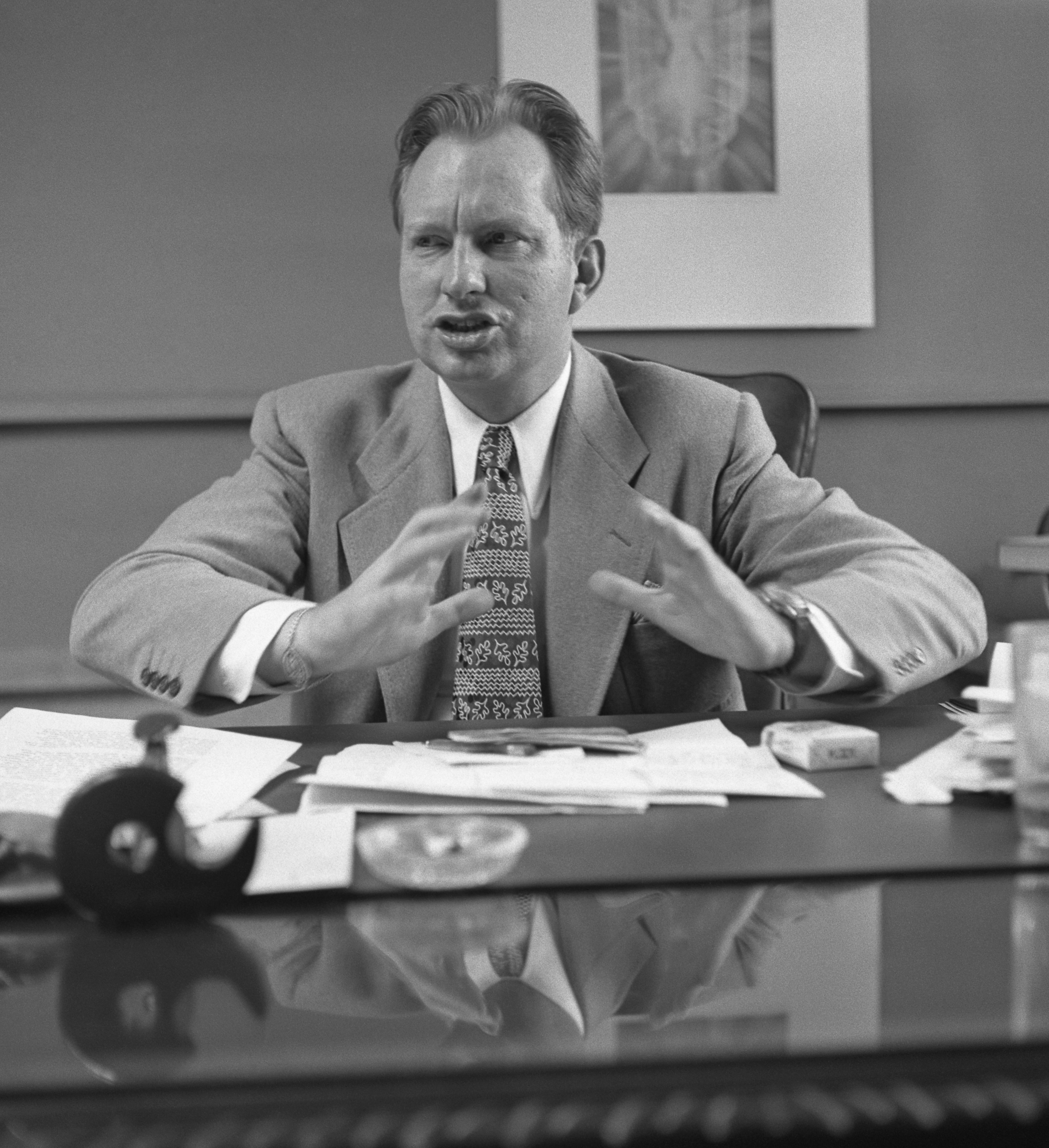
L. Ron Hubbard in 1950

Around August 1945, L. Ron Hubbard visited 1003 South Orange Grove Blvd at the behest of Lou Goldstone, a well-known science fiction illustrator who resided there.

Parsons took an immediate liking to Hubbard and invited him to stay in the house. Parsons wrote to Crowley that although Hubbard had "no formal training in Magick he has an extraordinary amount of experience and understanding in the field. From some of his experiences I deduce he is direct touch with some higher intelligence, possibly his Guardian Angel. ... He is the most Thelemic person I have ever met and is in complete accord with our own principles."

Hubbard became Parsons' "magical partner" for a sex magic ritual that was intended to summon an incarnation of a goddess.

Hubbard soon began "affairs with one girl after another in the house." Ultimately, Northrup became enamored of Hubbard. Hubbard and Northrup made no secret of their relationship; another lodger at Parsons' house how he saw Hubbard "living off Parsons' largesse and making out with his girlfriend right in front of him. Sometimes when the two of them were sitting at the table together, the hostility was almost tangible." Parsons, despite attempting to repress his passions, became intensely jealous. Parsons was deeply dismayed but tried to put a brave face on the situation, informing Aleister Crowley:

About three months ago I met Captain L. Ron Hubbard, a writer and explorer of whom I had known for some time … He is a gentleman; he has red hair, green eyes, is honest and intelligent, and we have become great friends. He moved in with me about two months ago, and although Betty and I are still friendly, she has transferred her sexual affection to Ron.

I think I have made a great gain and as Betty and I are the best of friends, there is little loss. I cared for her rather deeply but I have no desire to control her emotions, and I can, I hope, control my own. I need a magical partner. I have many experiments in mind.

Inspired by Crowley's novel Moonchild (1917), Parsons and Hubbard aimed to magically fertilize a "magical child" through immaculate conception, which when born to a woman somewhere on Earth nine months following the working's completion would become the Thelemic messiah embodying Babalon. To quote Metzger, the purpose of the Babalon Working was "a daring attempt to shatter the boundaries of space and time" facilitating, according to Parsons, the emergence of Thelema's Æon of Horus. Crowley was bewildered and concerned by the endeavor, complaining to Germer of being "fairly frantic when I contemplate the idiocy of these louts!"

Motivated to find a new partner through occult means, Parsons began to devote his energies to conducting black magic, causing concern among fellow O.T.O. members who believed that it was invoking troublesome spirits into the Parsonage; Jane Wolfe wrote to Crowley that "our own Jack is enamored with Witchcraft, the houmfort, voodoo. From the start he always wanted to evoke something—no matter what, I am inclined to think, as long as he got a result." He told the residents that he was imbuing statues in the house with a magical energy in order to sell them to fellow occultists. One ritual allegedly brought screaming banshees to the windows of the Parsonage, an incident that disturbed Forman for the rest of his life. Parsons reported paranormal events in the house resulting from the rituals; including poltergeist activity, sightings of orbs and ghostly apparitions, alchemical (sylphic) effect on the weather, and disembodied voices. One modern scholar speculates that the voices were a prank by Hubbard and Sara.

In December 1945 Parsons began a series of rituals based on Enochian magic during which he masturbated onto magical tablets, accompanied by Sergei Prokofiev's Second Violin Concerto. Describing this magical operation as the Babalon Working, he hoped to bring about the incarnation of Thelemite goddess Babalon onto Earth. He allowed Hubbard to take part as his "scribe", believing that he was particularly sensitive to detecting magical phenomena. As described by Richard Metzger, "Parsons jerked off in the name of spiritual advancement" while Hubbard "scanned the astral plane for signs and visions."

=== Hubbard–Northrup–Parsons business venture of 1946 ===
Hubbard, Northrup and Parsons agreed at the start of 1946 that they would go into business together, buying yachts on the East Coast and sailing them to California to sell at a profit. They set up a business partnership on January 15, 1946, under the name of "Allied Enterprises", with Parsons putting up $20,000 of capital, Hubbard adding $1,200 and Northrup contributing nothing.

Marjorie Cameron in the 1940s

When Cameron departed for a trip to New York, Parsons retreated to the desert, where he believed that a preternatural entity psychographically provided him with Liber 49, which represented a fourth part of Crowley's The Book of the Law, the primary sacred text of Thelema, as well as part of a new sacred text he called the Book of Babalon.

Their final ritual took place in the Mojave Desert in late February 1946, during which Parsons abruptly decided that his undertaking was complete. On returning to the Parsonage he discovered that a woman named Marjorie Cameron—an unemployed illustrator and former Navy WAVE—had come to visit. Believing her to be the "elemental" woman and manifestation of Babalon that he had invoked, in early March Parsons began performing sex magic rituals with Cameron, who acted as his "Scarlet Woman", while Hubbard continued to participate as the amanuensis. Unlike the rest of the household, Cameron knew nothing at first of Parsons' magical intentions: "I didn't know anything about the O.T.O., I didn't know that they had invoked me, I didn't know anything, but the whole house knew it. Everybody was watching to see what was going on." Despite this ignorance and her skepticism about Parsons' magic, Cameron reported her sighting of a UFO to Parsons, who secretly recorded the sighting as a materialization of Babalon.

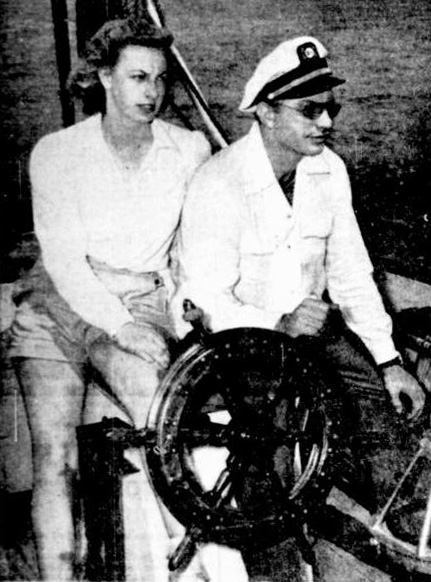
Hubbard and Northrup aboard the schooner Blue Water II in Miami, Florida, June 1946.

In April 1946, Hubbard and Northrup left for Florida, taking with him $10,000 drawn from the Allied Enterprises account to fund the purchase of the partnership's first yacht. Weeks passed without word from Hubbard. Louis Culling, another O.T.O. member, wrote to Karl Germer to explain the situation:

As you may know by this time, Brother John signed a partnership agreement with this Ron and Betty whereby all money earned by the three for life is equally divided between the three. As far as I can ascertain, Brother John has put in all of his money ... Meanwhile, Ron and Betty have bought a boat for themselves in Miami for about $10,000 and are living the life of Riley, while Brother John is living at Rock Bottom, and I mean Rock Bottom. It appears that originally they never secretly intended to bring this boat around to the California coast to sell at a profit, as they told Jack, but rather to have a good time on it on the east coast.

Crowley wrote to opine: "It seems to me on the information of our brethren in California that Parsons has got an illumination in which he has lost all his personal independence. From our brother's account he has given away both his girl and his money. Apparently it is the ordinary confidence trick."

Left "flat broke" by this defrauding, Parsons was incensed when he discovered that Hubbard and Sara had left for Miami with $10,000 of the money; he suspected a scam but was placated by a telephone call from Hubbard and agreed to remain business partners. When Crowley, in a telegram to Germer, dismissed Parsons as a "weak fool" and victim to Hubbard and Sara's obvious confidence trick, Parsons changed his mind, flew to Miami and placed a temporary injunction and restraining order on them. Upon tracking them down to a harbor in County Causeway, Parsons discovered that the couple had purchased three yachts as planned; they tried to flee aboard one but hit a squall and were forced to return to port. Parsons was convinced that he had brought them to shore through a lesser banishing ritual of the pentagram containing an astrological, geomantic invocation of Bartzabel—a vengeful spirit of Mars. Parsons initially attempted to obtain redress through magical means, carrying out a "Banishing Ritual of the Pentagram" to curse Hubbard and Northrup. He credited it with causing the couple to abort an attempt to evade him:

Hubbard attempted to escape me by sailing at 5 P.M., and I performed a full evocation to Bartzabel [the spirit of Mars or War] within the circle at 8 P.M. At the same time, so far as I can check, his ship was struck by a sudden squall off the coast, which ripped off his sails and forced him back to port, where I took the boat in custody... Here I am in Miami pursuing the children of my folly; they cannot move without going to jail. However I am afraid that most of the money has already been dissipated.

Parsons subsequently resorted to more conventional means of obtaining redress and sued the couple on July 1 in the Circuit Court for Dade County. His lawsuit accused Hubbard and Northrup of breaking the terms of their partnership, dissipating the assets and attempting to abscond. The case was settled out of court eleven days later, with Hubbard and Northrup agreeing to refund some of Parsons' money while keeping a yacht, the Harpoon, for themselves.

Northrup was able to dissuade Parsons from pressing his case by threatening to expose their past relationship, which had begun when she was under the legal age of consent. Hubbard's relationship with Northrup, while legal, had already caused alarm among those who knew him; Virginia Heinlein, the wife of the science fiction writer Robert Heinlein, regarded Hubbard as "a very sad case of post-war breakdown" and Northrup as his "latest Man-Eating Tigress".

Parsons was ultimately compensated with only $2,900. Hubbard, already married to Margaret Grubb, bigamously married Sara and went on to found Dianetics and Scientology.

== Final years: 1947 to 1949 ==
Parsons sold the Parsonage to developers for $25,000 under the condition that he and Cameron could continue to live in the coach house. Parsons appointed Roy Leffingwell to head the Agape Lodge, which would now have to meet elsewhere for its rituals. Agapé Lodge continued in Southern California until 1949, after which the Lodge ceased to hold regular meetings.

== Notable members and associates ==
Members initiated into O.T.O. before the establishment of the lodge included:

- Wilfred Talbot Smith was an English occultist and ceremonial magician who founded the California Agape Lodge in 1935.
- Karl Germer, who moved to the lodge after he was released from internment at Esterwegen concentration camp in 1941.
- Jane Wolfe was an American silent film actor who took part in the founding of the lodge and was later lodge master.

In addition to earlier members, a document entitled "O.T.O. Degree Work 1938-43" lists the names and initiation dates of 57 initiates.

- Elizabeth A. Burlingame (2/28/1942), spouse of Ray Burlingame.
- Ray G. Burlingame (12/14/1941), notable for his role in the founding of Solar Lodge.
- Barbara W. Canright (7/18/1942), a human computer at NASA's Jet Propulsion Laboratory (JPL).
- Richard B. Canright (7/18/1942), spouse of Barbara Canright.
- Louis T. Culling (5/18/1941) had been a follower of Choronzon Club and GBG founder C. F. Russell. In 1946, Culling wrote to Crowley informing him of Parsons' business venture with L. Ron Hubbard, future founder of Dianetics and Scientology. Culling was an advocate of the practice of Dianism, which he explains is "sexual congress without bringing it to climax", with each participant instructed to regard their partner not as a "known earthly personality" but as a "visible manifestation of one's Holy Guardian Angel. In the 1960s, Culling published two works entitled The Complete Magickal Curriculum of the Secret Order G.'.B.'.G.'. and Sex Magick.
- Reea G. Leffingwell (8/26/1939), spouse of Roy Leffingwell.
- Roy E. Leffingwell (2/24/1938), a Pasadena radio broadcaster and pianist, he became head of the lodge after Parsons.
- Grady L. McMurtry (6/13/1941), reconstituted the OTO in the 1970s, later married Phyllis Seckler.
- Sara E. Northrup (6/13/1941), sister of Helen Parsons, sister-in-law and later lover of Jack Parsons, later spouse of L. Ron Hubbard.
- John W. Parsons (2/15/1939), rocket fuel engineer, owner of Pasadena mansion, who became head of the Lodge. Spouse of Helen Parsons, brother-in-law and later, lover, to Sara Northrup.
- M. Helen Parsons (2/15/1939), spouse of Jack Parsons, sister of Sara Northrup. Ultimately married Wilfred Talbot Smith.
- Carl R. Pastor (12/12/1942), father of Harry Helmuth Pastor.
- Harry H. Pastor (12/5/1942), Beat Generation coffeehouse and nightclub owner, poet, actor, and hipster.
- Phyllis E. Seckler (8/26/1939), who in the 1970s would marry Grady McMurty and be involved in reconstituting the OTO.
- Harold S. Soule (8/26/39), son-in-law of Roy Leffingwell and recording engineer.

Parsons also rented rooms at the 1003 S. Orange Grove Boulevard house to non-Thelemites, including journalist Nieson Himmel, Manhattan Project physicist Robert Cornog, and science fiction artist Louis Goldstone.

== See also ==
- Abbey of Thelema
- List of Thelemites
- Members of Ordo Templi Orientis
