= Barbara Canright =

American human computer

- Born: Barbara Canright; November 12, 1919; Ohio
- Died: September 17, 1997 (aged 77); Seattle, Washington
- Occupation: JPL Human Computer
- Employer: Jet Propulsion Laboratory
- Spouse: Richard Canright (1938–1964)
- Children: Bruce Canright Patricia Canright Smith Geoff Canright David Canright

Barbara Canright (born St. John, 1919–1997) was an American human computer at NASA's Jet Propulsion Laboratory (JPL) who was the first female mathematician to be employed. Canright joined the team in 1939 as a human computer, which required "Teams of people who were frequently used to undertake long and often tedious calculations; the work was divided so that this could be done in parallel." During her time at the JPL program she was instrumental in calculating both the thrust-to-weight ratio for performance of engines under various conditions, and the potential of rocket propellant (which would be used by the U.S. Navy). Canright was critical in the development of the JPL program and laid the foundations for other women to work in a field which was previously closed off to them.

== Early life and education ==
Canright was born on November 12, 1919, in Iowa during the midst of the American Roaring 20's. Canright was an exceptionally smart student during high-school and took upper-level classes, most notably in math and Chemistry. She met her future husband, Richard Canright, when they were both undergrads at Miami University of Ohio, where her father was a Professor and dean of students. After eloping when she was 19 and he was 21, they moved to Pasadena for Richard to attend graduate school at Caltech. Before joining JPL, Canright worked as a typist while attending college at Occidental College in Los Angeles. Canright graduated from Occidental College in 1940.

== Career ==
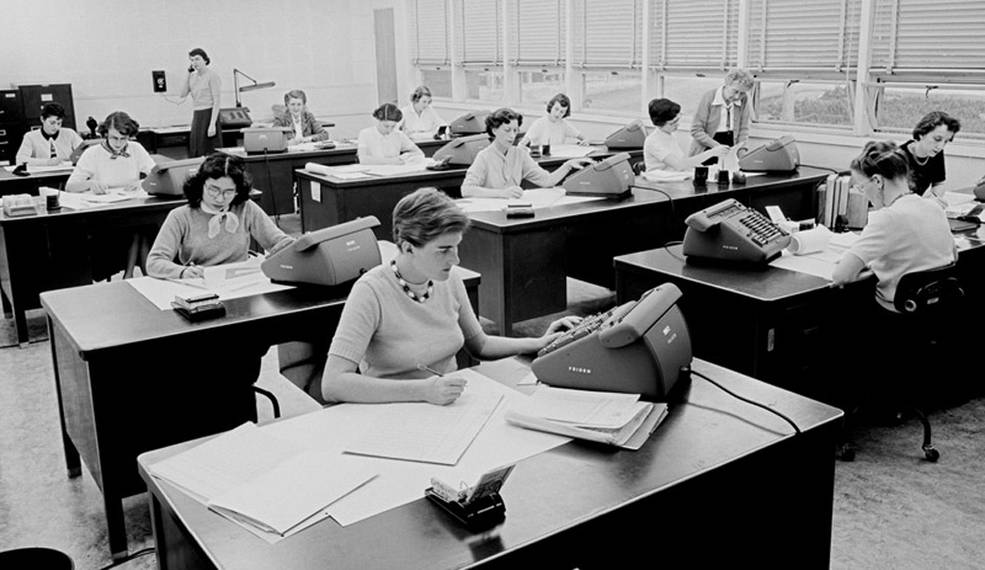
Human computers – Jet Propulsion Laboratory employees

In 1939 the National Academy of Sciences approached Caltech's Guggenheim Aeronautical Laboratory (who were known around Caltech's campus as the "Suicide Squad" because of numerous experiments gone wrong) with a grant for Rocket Research of $1,000. The next year, the U.S. government invested $10,000 into the program, which prompted the group to hire outside help.

One of the men who started JPL, Frank Malina, approached Barbara and Richard Canright for positions as mathematicians. Both Barbara and Richard accepted the positions which made Barbara the only female employee at JPL at the time. During her time at JPL, Canright calculated thrust from rocket engines and analyzed the data to increase performance. One of JPL's, and Canright's, crowning achievements was the successful use of rockets for bomber aircraft.

After the successful development of jet propulsion bombers, JPL shifted its focus to designing a rocket which would reach a higher altitude than a helium-filled balloon. Canright, along with Melba Nead, Virginia Prettyman, and Macie Roberts, were responsible for calculating the potential of rocket propellants. During this period, Canright her husband Richard were introduced to Agape Lodge of Ordo Templi Orientis by JPL co-founder Jack Parsons. They became students and followers of Thelema, a religious movement started by Aleister Crowley. They were both initiated into the Order at Agape Lodge on July 18, 1942.

In 1943, after the success of designing and testing of a rocket propellant, Canright became pregnant with her first child. Due to the unavailability of maternity leave in 1943, Canright had to resign.

== Later life ==
Just like her early life, Canright's life after the JPL program has largely been forgotten. Some information has been uncovered through Barbara's daughter, Patricia Canright Smith. Throughout Barbara and Richard's marriage they had four children: Bruce Canright, Patricia Canright Smith, Geoff Canright, and David Canright. Bruce was a scientist at NASA, Geoff, a physics professor, David, a math professor, and Patricia, a private-practice psychotherapist. In 1964 Barbara and Richard Canright divorced after 26 years of marriage. Barbara Canright died in Seattle Washington at age 78 on September 17, 1997.

== Recognition ==
Barbara Canright's crucial role in the development of the JPL program has been remembered through Nathalia Holt's book Rise of the Rocket Girls and an article by Occidental College, Canright's Alma mater, Guardians of the Galaxy. Additionally, Barbara's daughter, Patricia Canright Smith, has preserved Barbara's life in her poem She Would Love to See China.

== See also ==
- List of Thelemites
- Members of Ordo Templi Orientis
