= Phyllis Seckler =

American occultist (1917–2004)

- Soror Meral
- Title: Guiding Teacher

Personal life
- Born: Phyllis Evalina Pratt; 18 June 1917 Edmonton, Alberta, Canada
- Died: 31 May 2004 (aged 86) Oroville, California, United States
- Known for: Re-establishment of O.T.O., empowerment of women in Thelema

Religious life
- Religion: Thelema
- Temple: Lodge 418
- Order: Ordo Templi Orientis
- Church: Ecclesia Gnostica Catholica
- Founder of: College of Thelema, Temple of the Silver Star
- Lineage: A∴A∴ lineage of Soror Estai
- Profession: Teacher

Senior posting
- Teacher: Jane Wolfe
- Successor: David Shoemaker, James Eshelman
- Students: David Shoemaker

Phyllis Evalina Seckler (18 June 1917 – 31 May 2004), also known as Soror Meral, was an American occultist and writer. She was a ninth degree (IX°) member of the Sovereign Sanctuary of the Gnosis of Ordo Templi Orientis (O.T.O.), and a lineage holder in the A∴A∴ tradition. She was a student of Jane Wolfe, herself a student of Aleister Crowley.

She was a member of the Agape Lodge, the only working Lodge of the O.T.O. at the time of Aleister Crowley's death. Seckler was also instrumental in preserving important parts of Crowley's literary heritage, typing parts of his Confessions, and the complete texts of The Vision and the Voice and Magick Without Tears during the 1950s. Seckler was also instrumental in re-activating the O.T.O. with Grady Louis McMurtry, during the early-mid 1970s, following the death of Crowley's appointed successor, Karl Germer.

Seckler continued her lifelong work with the A∴A∴, founding the College of Thelema and co-founding (with James A. Eshelman) the Temple of Thelema, and later warranting the formation of the Temple of the Silver Star. For 25 years she published the bi-annual Thelemic journal In the Continuum. Seckler served as a master of 418 Lodge of O.T.O. in California from its inception in 1979 until her death.

== Early life ==
=== Youth: 1917–1939 ===
Seckler was born in Edmonton, Canada on 18 June 1917. Her family moved to California when she was only about four years of age, as her father had lost a political bid for mayor of Edmonton and had gone deeply into debt for that. After graduation from high school in Los Angeles, she had a year of work in a Junior College and then another year of work to fit her to be a stenographer. She then got a job with a bank and attended drama classes in Hollywood conducted by Regina Kahl who was a member of Ordo Templi Orientis. She attended The Gnostic Mass written by Crowley and met Wilfred Talbot Smith and actress Jane Wolfe. She joined the O.T.O. in August 1939 and on 6 June, of 1940, became a Probationer of the A∴A∴ under Jane Wolfe, who had studied with Crowley in Cefalu.

=== O.T.O. Agape Lodge: 1939–1944 ===
Agape Lodge No. 2, founded by Wilfred Smith in 1935, was based in Hollywood, and initially had 7 initiates to the Minerval level. The lodge held regular meetings, lectures, and study classes, as well as social events and a weekly Gnostic Mass open to the public. On 6 June 1939 Seckler, and other individuals who attended drama classes, including Louis T. Culling and Roy Leffingwell were brought in by Regina Kahl who worked as a drama teacher. Kahl was a drama teacher at Los Angeles City College and the program was under the auspices of the W.P.A. to put people to work during the depression years. Since Kahl had been on the stage many times and had studied her drama parts for opera, she knew quite a lot about theatre. Seckler joined her class in January 1937 as she was bored with her job in the bank and found that it was quite a challenge to memorize her parts and to put on the skits and small plays which Kahl had asked of the class. She often mentioned matters having to do with Thelema and quotes from Crowley.

Near the end of the semester, Regina Kahl decided to put on a small play in the attic of the house on 1746 Winona Boulevard where the Gnostic Mass was held. They had a dais with 3 steps and curtains and Kahl decided that this could be used for a play. About five of Kahl's students worked on presenting the play. It was a warm evening June evening and Seckler walked through the dark with some anticipation to the evening's entertainment. Seckler joined the crowd and soon their group went upstairs to the second floor and thence to the attic of the house and heard the play with a good deal of enjoyment. Afterwards, they went down to the living room and were entertained with refreshments and good conversation. Again the invitation to the Mass was given. Then Wilfred Talbot Smith quoted some Crowley's poetry. Seckler was attracted by an atmosphere and took the occasion to attend the Gnostic Mass several times that summer, often with Paul Seckler who later became her husband, or another friend. Other Agape lodge members included rocket scientist Jack Parsons, his wife Helen Parsons, L. Ron Hubbard and Helen Parson's sister Sara Northrup who he later married. Seckler made a friend of Ron Hubbard, as well as becoming friends with Wilfred Smith. She subsequently moved into the large house rented by the O.T.O. at 1003 South Orange Grove Avenue in Pasadena, where many of the lodge members, including Hubbard, were living as a form of commune and raising livestock and vegetables in the grounds.

=== Art and teaching: 1945—1947 ===
Seckler studied Art and graduated with honors and an M.A. from the University of California in Los Angeles. After she had her teaching credential for Art, she taught in a Northern California High School for 20 years. About three years after the start of her job, Jane Wolfe died and left all of her papers and books to Seckler. Also, during those years, Seckler focused on her work in the A.·.A.·. and became a good friend of Karl Germer who was a friend of Jane Wolfe and at the time lived in New Jersey working as a merchant of machinery. Their friendship had started by correspondence.

During Seckler's years as a teacher, Karl Germer, who was in continuous correspondence with her, oversaw the work of her degree. She later met Marcelo Motta who was introduced to her by Germer and wrote to him but his letters showed a dictatorial attitude towards her.

== Later life ==
=== Rescue of Crowley literary remains: 1947–1969 ===
Crowley died on 1 December 1947. Agape Lodge, of which Seckler was a long-standing member, was the only working Lodge of the O.T.O. at that time. At the time of Crowley's death, many of his important manuscripts had yet to be located, stored as they were in different locations with different followers, and many were yet unpublished.

Karl Germer, who was appointed Crowley's successor, became the Outer Head of the Order (O.H.O.) and started working on preservation of Crowley's literary remains.

In his capacity of Grand Treasurer General, Germer was sent 3 tons of materials from England. He moved these literary materials to a house in Hampton, New Jersey, where he set up a dedicated library and began the work of filing and record keeping. Before the materials had been sent to the United States, copies of everything in manuscript form had been made in England. Afterwards Germer and Gerald Yorke collaborated on sending each other a copy of anything that Crowley had written which the other did not have. Yorke intended to leave the Crowley papers in his possession to the British Museum. There was also a third person in England who obtained many copies of various of Crowley's writings. Yorke later sent much of his collection to the Warburg Institute in London where it is currently housed. Seckler was unaware that there were copies made and many of her actions and concerns were based on the belief that there was only one copy extant of Crowley's unpublished writings.

It was due to Germer's effort and that of Israel Regardie and a few others that Crowley's work was preserved and published. In 1951, when Germer was in Hampton, New Jersey, Seckler wrote about her concern that some of the unpublished works of Crowley might be lost unless some copies were made. He agreed about her concern and the upshot of this correspondence was that Seckler began to type copies. During the summer of 1951, she typed part of the Confessions. During the summer of 1952, she typed The Vision and the Voice with all its complicated notes in the text. Her knowledge of the Qabalah enabled her to spot typist errors in the manuscripts. The third summer she typed Magick Without Tears. The two later typings which were done on multilith plates, were sent to Germer in Hampton, and there he had the assistance of two devoted members of O.T.O. to make reproductions. Germer was deeply grateful for Seckler's labour and efforts and gifted Seckler with Crowley's material which at the time was hard to find.

In 1954, soon after Magick Without Tears. was printed, Germer retired from his job in New Jersey and moved to California. He had been living in New Jersey for about seven years and at first did not have a regular base of operations in California. This was Germer's concern and for some time he was trying to find decent headquarters where he could continue with publishing Crowley's. After about 2 years he found a house in West Point, California. He then set up the Head Office of the O.T.O. there and put together the library which had been packed away while he was moving. Trying to preserve Crowley's work, he engaged himself in sending Crowley's writings to various publishers.

==== Germer’s death: 1962 ====
Germer died in late October 1962 and the will he made to dispose of Crowley's literary remains provided that all of the Crowley materials should go to the Heads of Ordo Templi Orientis, carrying hereditary rights. Sascha Germer and Frederick Mellinger of the Swiss O.T.O. were appointed to act as executors of the will. All Germer's personal property was to be left to Sascha. After Germer's death, Germer's widow became very suspicious and could not place the materials in any place suited to their importance. Seckler was almost the first one to be informed by Germer's widow of his death.

A correspondence was begun between Germer's widow and Frederick Mellinger, but Mellinger would not come to California to help with the disposal of Germer's library. Soon after this, Mellinger died and Sascha was left with the task of discovering what to do about Germer library, correspondence and other materials.

Knowing that Sascha Germer could not fulfill the task of securing Germer's library, Seckler asked for help from 'higher planes' and was reportedly instructed clearly to help Sascha secure Crowley's literary remains. One of Seckler's other instructions, which she later passed on to Sascha, was that she was not to let anyone in Southern California hear of Germer's death. Intuitively, Seckler was alarmed that the materials should be guarded only by Germer's widow and felt that something was terribly wrong in South California.

==== The Germer Estate robbery: 1967 ====
By 1967, the news of Germer's death had spread to Southern California. The upshot of this was that a group of people turned up at the Germer estate, which served as the headquarters of O.T.O. during Karl Germer's life. They told Germer's widow that they were members of O.T.O. and she fell for the trick and opened the door. Immediately they blew gas in her face, overpowered her, and administered some sort of shot which put her out completely. They then robbed Germer's library on the second floor of the house. The local sheriff was called to Germer's house and a report was made.

In 1967, Seckler was informed that there had been a theft of items that were considered a part of O.T.O. heritage material from Germer's house. Sascha Germer was robbed of some of the most important documents and accused Seckler's child Stella of taking them.

Since this was an outright fabrication, Seckler decided to find who the thieves might be. During the course of her investigation she wrote to various people, discovering the whereabouts of former Agape Lodge members, including her female friend who had been very active in Thelema for many years and had many students. She visited Seckler to let her know about some thefts from her own apartment by one of her trusted students after her husband's death in the summer of 1965. A year later Israel Regardie's library was also subjected to thievery by the same group of people when Regardie was absent. The last robbery was of Germer's house in West Point. It was later discovered that the robberies were carried out by the members of an organisation who called themselves The Solar Lodge. They later got themselves into trouble (The Boy in the Box (Vidal, California)) and the organisation was closed down by the FBI.

==== Rescue of O.T.O. heritage: 1975 ====
Germer's widow Sascha died on 1 April 1975, but Seckler only heard about it a year later. Helen Parsons Smith and Seckler drove to Germer's house in West Point in late April 1976 and discovered that Sascha had been dead for a year and that the house had been vandalised three times or more since her death, as it was almost impossible to lock it up properly.

While the 1967 robbery and subsequent events caused some damage, part of Germer's library had survived. The Crowley archive was recovered from the Germer estate during the summer of 1976 after the rights were finally transferred to O.T.O. and it was later moved to a storage facility in California. The contents included Crowley manuscripts, surviving catalogues of Crowley typescripts and memorabilia.

=== Re-establishing O.T.O. 1969–1978 ===
During her investigation of the robbery of Germer's library, Seckler began corresponding with Grady McMurtry who resided in Washington, D.C. at the time. As a result of their lengthy correspondence from Dec. of 1968 to April 1969, McMurtry left his job in Washington, D. C. and travelled to California, arriving there on 29 April 1969. McMurtry learned from her for the first time that Germer had been dead for several years.

Seckler learned that McMurtry, who had met Crowley, held letters of authorization from Crowley in regards to the O.T.O. The meeting occurred when McMurtry was a young Lieutenant in the American forces, serving in England during World War II. Crowley appears to have anticipated that Germer might not appoint a successor. In those letters Crowley named him as Caliph and successor to Germer, authorising McMurtry to take charge of the O.T.O. in case of emergency. Seckler later re-activated the Order with McMurtry (Frater Hymenaeus Alpha) by invoking his "emergency powers" to reconstitute the order, which had flagged following Germer's death. McMurtry and Seckler were both longstanding members of the O.T.O. Due to the combined efforts of McMurtry and Seckler, O.T.O. was incorporated under California law and began to grow in North America for the first time since Crowley's death.

=== 418 Lodge: 1979–2004 ===
Under her pen name Soror Meral, Seckler served as a Master of 418 Lodge of O.T.O. in California from its inception in 1979 until her death.

=== The College of Thelema ===
Seckler founded The College of Thelema. She was co-founder (with James A. Eshelman & Anna-Kria King) of the Temple of Thelema. Both organisations have a course of studies devised by Seckler to make it easier for aspirants to A∴A∴ succeed in the A∴A∴ system.

=== The Temple of the Silver Star ===
Prior to her death, Seckler warranted the founding of the Temple of the Silver Star as an autonomous continuation of her work, which was subsequently founded by Seckler's student David Shoemaker in 2008.

== Works ==
Seeking to guide her students to an understanding of the Law of Thelema, especially deeper understanding of oneself and of one's magickal Will, Seckler continually published the bi-annual journal In The Continuum which featured her essays on Thelema and initiation, including those from Crowley's Collected Works, as well as instructional articles for the students of the A.:.A.:., illustrations and essays which help to clarify some of Crowley's thoughts and aid in the understanding of Thelemic principles expressed in Liber AL. Printed for nearly 25 years from 1976 through 1996, In The Continuum also published rare works by Aleister Crowley which at the time were out of print or hard to find.

== Empowerment of women ==
Throughout her life Seckler was an outspoken supporter of women's rights campaigner who supported working women. She campaigned for the empowerment of women in the Thelemic community with a particular focus on women whose contribution to the Thelemic movement was overlooked. She used her skills as a writer to publicise Thelemic women's cause in her bi-annual journal In The Continuum, aiming to raise awareness on important Thelemic matters, often expressing her criticism of certain Thelemic groups who would only accept those women who had social status and good education.She wished to give opportunities to disadvantaged Thelemites, including those suffering from poverty and illiteracy, inviting them to submit their articles and illustrations for her Thelemic periodical. She also wished to make use of the technology of cinema to make Thelema more accessible to a wider audience.

== Publications ==
- Seckler, Phyllis (2003). Cornelius, Jerry (ed.). "Jane Wolfe: Her Life With Aleister Crowley". Red Flame (10–11).
- Seckler, Phyllis (2010). Rorac Johnson; Gregory Peters; David Shoemaker (eds.). The Thoth Tarot, Astrology & Other Selected Writings. Teitan Press. ISBN 978-0-933429-19-2.
- Seckler, Phyllis (2012). Rorac Johnson; Gregory Peters; David Shoemaker (eds.). The Kabbalah, Magick, and Thelema: Selected Writings. Vol. II. Teitan Press. ISBN 978-0-933429-28-4.

== See also ==
- Great Work
- List of Thelemites
- Members of OTO
- Secret Chiefs
