= Karl Germer =

German and American occultist

Karl Johannes Germer
- Born: 22 January 1885; Elberfeld, Germany
- Died: 25 October 1962 (aged 77); West Point, California
- Known for: Frater Superior of Ordo Templi Orientis, 1947 – 1962

Karl Johannes Germer (22 January 1885 – 25 October 1962), also known as Frater Saturnus, was a German and American businessman and occultist. He served as the United States representative of Ordo Templi Orientis, and on the death of Aleister Crowley became his successor as the Outer Head of the Order (OHO) until his death in 1962. He founded the Thelema Publishing Company and published several of Crowley's books after his death. He was born in Elberfeld, Germany and died in West Point, California.

== Early life ==
Germer studied in a university, worked as a military intelligence officer in the First World War and received first and second class Iron Crosses for his service. In 1923 he sold his Vienna property and founded the publishing house Pansophia Verlag in Munich. Germer stayed with his first wife at the Abbey of Thelema from the beginning of January until February 1926.

== First visit to the United States: 1926–1935 ==
In 1926, Germer got married for the second time and travelled to the United States, his wife being an American citizen. By 1927 Germer and his wife Cora Eaton were living in New York where Germer worked as a merchant of machinery. There, in his capacity of Grand Treasurer General of O.T.O. Germer begun raising funds for the Order. Money was always a problem but Germer saw that Crowley must have it so that the work could go on and the books could be published. He raised funds for Crowley in one way or another, making donations of his own and contributing money from O.T.O members whom he could interest in donating it to O.T.O.

By 1930, Germer and his second wife travelled to Europe had stayed with Crowley for a short while to raise funds for the exhibition of Crowley's paintings in Germany. Germer wanted to help Crowley to be published, and help promote Crowley's philosophy of Thelema via Crowley's artwork and by the distribution of Crowley's publications. Since Germer had business experience, he did well at this, even though he often had insufficient funds.

== Nazi persecution and the aftermath: 1935–1940 ==
=== Rise of Nazi Germany ===
Germer's US visa expired and he had to return to Germany in 1935. When Adolf Hitler came to power, Germer came under suspicion because of his association with Crowley and teaching Thelema in Germany. Martha Kuntzel, who enjoyed a high reputation in Germany amongst aristocrats, presented Hitler (of whom she thought highly before he came to power) with a copy of Liber AL, the Holy Book of Thelema. Kuntzel had been working for some years on translations of Crowley's works into German. Liber AL was known well enough in higher German circles after Kuntzel translated and introduced it to the German public. However, soon after the start of World War II, Hitler banned it in Germany, as well as many books on religion, qabalah, astrology, esoteric studies and gematria.

Since Hitler knew enough about Thelema to ban Liber AL in Germany, Germer became his enemy when his religious beliefs became known. On Hitler's orders, Germer was arrested by the Gestapo on 13 February 1935 in Leipzig and incarcerated. He was first held at the Columbia-Haus prison in Berlin. There he was allowed to work a short time on an architect's office.

=== Esterwegen concentration camp ===
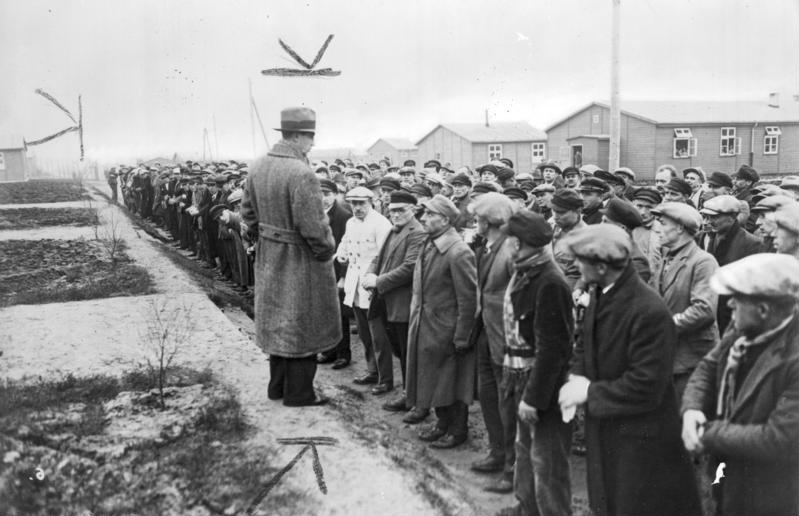
Inmates at Esterwegen

Having seen too much of Hitler's brutality at Columbia-Haus, Germer wrote to his wife, Cora, about it. At around the same time, Cora contacted the American Consulate in Berlin who pleaded for Germer's return to the US as his wife was a US citizen. This was seen as a crime by the Nazis and they punished Germer even further, deporting him to the Esterwegen concentration camp on the Dutch Frontier where thousands of Hitler's political enemies were deported by the Nazis. Germer remained there for seven months, witnessing cruelties of various sorts on the Nazi side. His wife Cora now did not know where he was and could do nothing but return to America, where she again began her appeal to various US authorities. When they helped her to discover his location, she sent Germer a cable. Germer wrote a reply to her and it was read by the Nazis which resulted in Germer being placed in solitary confinement. He was no longer allowed to read and for six weeks, he never saw the day nor was allowed in the open air.

=== Years in Belgium and France ===
At the end of August of that year Germer was temporarily freed from detention at Esterwegen. His defense being that he had been a Major in World War I on the German side and was also of pure German blood, and that the charges were too vague. Germer moved to Belgium where he took an apartment and started working as an exporter of heavy farm machinery in Brussels, making frequent trips to England and Ireland. This was with great difficulty as the war and Hitler's movements were making travel difficult. In Brussels, Germer had the means to store his personal belongings, his diaries and other things at a friend's house. Between 1939 and 1940 he wrote 223 pages of his autobiographical book "Protective Prisoner No 303" about his experiences in the concentration camp, which he wanted to publish. On 10 May 1940, when the Germans marched into Belgium Germer was again incarcerated. As the Germans advanced, Germer was transferred to the French authorities who held him in a French concentration camp of Lévitan. He was later sent to Saint-Cyprien camp in the Pyrénées-Orientales where 90,000 Spanish refugees were interned in March 1939. It was officially closed on 19 December 1940 for "sanitary reasons". Its occupants, including Germer, were transferred to the Camp of Gurs where in October 1940 thousands of Jewish women, children, and the elderly, who had not gone to the Nazi concentration camps in Germany, were deported from the Baden region of Germany as per official Nazi policy which was overseen by Adolf Eichmann.

=== Liberation and return to the United States ===
On 1 September 1941 a non-quota immigration visa had been obtained for Germer by his American wife. But French authorities made it almost impossible for Germer to obtain the permit quickly, despite all kinds of urgent steps undertaken by his wife and the American Ambassador and Consul. French authorities only gave him permission to go to Marseille to see the American Consul four months after the visa was granted. Upon release from the Nazi concentration camp in February 1941, Germer returned to the United States. Securing a job as a merchant of machinery upon his return to New York, Germer continued his fundraising activities for Crowley who appointed him his personal representative in the United States.

== Later life: 1941–1962 ==
=== Grand Treasurer General of O.T.O. ===
Germer had seen that Crowley needed aid to finish his publishing work in his later years. In his capacity of Grand Treasurer General of Ordo Templi Orientis, Germer raised over $25,000 for publishing Crowley's works, as well as assisting with Crowley's personal support and maintenance. On 13 July 1942, Germer's wife Cora Eaton died of a heart attack. Two months later, on 23 September 1942, Germer married Vienna piano teacher Sascha Ernestine Andre. For many years, he and Sascha sent at least $200 monthly to Crowley, being Crowley's most devoted supporters of their time.

=== O.H.O. of O.T.O. ===
In 1942, Crowley appointed Germer as his successor as the Outer Head of the Order (O.H.O.) of Ordo Templi Orientis and he fulfilled that position after Crowley's death in 1947. Germer was also a special appointee of the Order with jurisdiction over Agape Lodge. Germer had had a lot of trouble getting reports from Agape Lodge and answers to his letters from Wilfred Talbot Smith, the lodge master. Instead, Germer kept in touch with Jane Wolfe, one of Agape Lodge's founding members. Through Wolfe he made acquaintance and good friendship of Phyllis Seckler. Their friendship began by correspondence when Seckler was in college.

Crowley died on 1 December 1947. Germer then actively took up the role of Outer Head of the Order (O.H.O.). He started working on preservation of Crowley's literary remains and getting his books published. At the time of Crowley's death there were still many important manuscripts which were yet unpublished; Germer sent these to various publishers, seeing these works of Crowley into print for the first time. Crowley's remains were buried in Germer's New Jersey garden.

In 1953, Germer was introduced to Marcelo Motta and took him as his student in the A∴A∴

=== Move to Southern California ===
In 1954, Germer retired from his job in New Jersey and moved to California on the advice of Jane Wolfe and her student Phyllis Seckler who were his confidants. After about 2 years he found a house in West Point, California where he set up a Head Office of O.T.O and put together the Order's library containing Crowley works and O.T.O. files which later became a subject of a dispute due to Germer's will being lost or stolen after his death.

In January 1957, Marcelo Motta visited Germer at his new headquarters in West Point and in early January 1957 Germer, Jane Wolfe and Motta visited Phyllis Seckler at Livermore, California. It was their last meeting before Germer died.

=== Final years ===
In his letters Germer often mentioned his task in life was to support Crowley, and to do his best to publish Crowley's writings. He did not expect to die before accomplishing this task the way he envisaged it, and therefore did not name a successor in his will.

=== Death and estate ===
Germer died as a result of prostate cancer in late October 1962.

The will Germer made to dispose of Crowley's literary remains kept at his estate provided that all of the Crowley materials should go to the Heads of Ordo Templi Orientis. Sascha Germer and Frederick Mellinger of Swiss O.T.O. were appointed to act as executors of the will. All Germer's personal property was to be left to Sascha Germer.

== Personal life ==
Over the course of his life, Germer married and divorced three times; his late wife Sascha Germer was named as one of the executors of his will, in charge of his literary remains. He had no children.

== See also ==
- List of Thelemites
- Members of Ordo Templi Orientis

== Publications ==
- Crowley, Aleister (1952). Germer, Karl J. (ed.). The Vision and the Voice (1st ed.). Barstow, California: Thelema Publishing Company. With an introduction by Israel Regardie.
- Crowley, Aleister (1953). Germer, Karl J. (ed.). "The Gospel According to St Bernard Shaw". The Equinox. III (2). Hampton, New Jersey: Thelema Publishing Company.
- Crowley, Aleister (1954). Germer, Karl J. (ed.). Magick Without Tears. Hampton, New Jersey: Thelema Publishing Company.
- Crowley, Aleister (1962). Germer, Karl J. (ed.). The Book of Lies [with commentary]. Ilfracombe, Devon: The Hayden Press.
- Crowley, Aleister (1962). Germer, Karl J. (ed.). "Liber Aleph vel CXI: The Book of Wisdom or Folly". The Equinox. III (6). West Point, California: Thelema Publishing Company.
