= Grady Louis McMurtry =

American poet (1918–1985)

Grady L. McMurtry
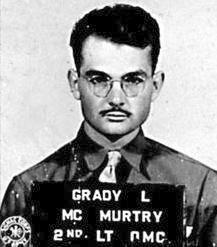
- Grady Louis McMurtry as an officer in 1941
- Born: October 18, 1918; Big Cabin, Oklahoma
- Died: July 12, 1985 (aged 66); Martinez, California
- Education: University of California, Berkeley
- Occupations: Caliph, OTO

Grady Louis McMurtry (October 18, 1918 – July 12, 1985) was an American ceremonial magician, student of occult writer Aleister Crowley, and an adherent of Thelema. He is best known for reviving the fraternal organization Ordo Templi Orientis, which he headed from 1971 until his death in 1985.

== Early life and career ==
He lived in various parts of Oklahoma and the Midwest, and graduated from high school in Valley Center, Kansas in 1937. He then moved to Southern California to study engineering at Pasadena Junior College, where he made friends with some students at the nearby California Institute of Technology. Among them was Jack Parsons, who shared his enthusiasm for science fiction, and who introduced him to Thelema. In 1941 McMurtry was initiated into the Minerval and I° of Ordo Templi Orientis (O.T.O.), a secret society headed at the time by Aleister Crowley.

In February 1942, two months after the Japanese attack on Pearl Harbor, McMurtry's entire Reserve Officers Training Corps class was called to active duty, and he served as an officer in Ordnance. He took part in the invasion of Normandy, the liberation of France and Belgium, and the occupation of Germany. He was recalled to active duty to serve in the Korean War, eventually reaching the rank of major. He was recalled again for another tour of duty in Korea in the early 1960s. Six months prior to completing 30 years of Reserve service, he was mustered out as a lieutenant colonel during a RIF (Reduction In Force) and lost what would have been an earned pension. He continued his academic studies as a civilian between tours of duty at the University of California, Berkeley, where he completed his A.B. in political science in 1948 and an M.A. in the discipline in 1955. His thesis for the latter degree examined the parallels between magic and Marxism. In a 1970 conversation with Jacques Vallée (who was flummoxed by McMurtry's lengthy military career), McMurtry identified as a political liberal. He noted his opposition to Richard Nixon's Middle East policies and characterized himself as "a poet who happened to fight in two wars."

During World War II, especially when he was stationed in England in 1943 and the first half of 1944, McMurtry was able to meet with and become a personal student of Aleister Crowley, who elevated him to IX° of O.T.O., giving him the name Hymenaeus Alpha (which enumerates to 777) in November 1943.

In September and November 1944 (and once again in June 1947), he received letters from Crowley referring to him as Crowley's "Caliph" (or successor). When McMurtry returned to California after the war he was appointed Crowley's O.T.O. representative in the United States (April 1946), subject only to the authority of Crowley's viceroy and heir apparent, Karl Germer.

Crowley died in December 1947, and Germer was recognized as the head of O.T.O. At the time the only functioning Thelemic O.T.O. body in the world was Agape Lodge in Southern California, which was headed for a time by McMurtry's friend Jack Parsons. McMurtry planned to start a lodge in Northern California, but his deteriorating relationship with Karl Germer (based on Germer's refusal to initiate new members) put an end to his plans. He tried to organize other O.T.O. members in California to lobby Germer to change his policy, but the situation came to a head at a meeting in 1959 in which Dr. Gabriel Montenegro (Germer's representative) "ordered" McMurtry to cease his efforts. This order was reiterated in writing in November 1960. McMurtry unwillingly complied with the order, and he was disillusioned enough by this turn of events that he ended his direct involvement with O.T.O. In 1961 he moved to Washington, D.C., where he soon became completely out of touch with other O.T.O. members.

== Re-establishing O.T.O. ==
On October 25, 1962 Germer died from prostatic cancer at the age of 77, without naming a successor as head of O.T.O. His widow, who was not a member of O.T.O., retained material possession of the O.T.O.'s extensive archives. Though individual members carried on with their spiritual activities, the central organization, for all intents and purposes, ceased to function.

There were a few individuals, notably Kenneth Grant of Britain, Hermann Metzger of Switzerland, and later, Marcelo Ramos Motta of Brazil, who claimed succession to Germer. McMurtry was unaware of any of these developments until 1968, when he received a letter from Phyllis Seckler, a fellow Agape Lodge O.T.O. initiate.

Seckler's letter was to inform McMurtry that the archives in Germer's widow's care (including Aleister Crowley's library) had been burglarized the previous year by persons unknown. When he became aware of the situation he decided to take charge of what remained of O.T.O. In 1969 he left his job at the United States Department of Labor and returned to California to investigate the burglary. Though the crime was never officially solved, McMurtry felt that it had probably been carried out by a group, claiming affiliation with O.T.O., that called itself the "Solar Lodge". McMurtry had moved into Seckler's home in Dublin, California, and soon they were married.

At this time, McMurtry decided to restore the Order by invoking his emergency orders from Crowley which gave him authority (subject to Karl Germer's approval) to "take charge of the whole work of the Order in California to reform the Organization", and he assumed the title "Caliph of O.T.O.," as specified in Crowley's letters to McMurtry from the 1940s. His witnesses were Dr. Israel Regardie (1907–1985) and Gerald Yorke, who both offered their support.

Along with Seckler and two other surviving members, Mildred Burlingame and Helen Parsons Smith, he slowly began performing O.T.O. initiations again. They also eventually succeeded in their efforts to find a publisher for the Thoth tarot deck designed by Aleister Crowley. O.T.O. was registered with the State of California on December 28, 1971 as a legal organization.

In 1974 McMurtry and Seckler separated, and he moved to Berkeley, California. Germer's widow died in 1975, and in 1976 the surviving members of O.T.O. were enabled by court order to claim the still considerable archives. In October 1977 McMurtry founded Thelema Lodge in Berkeley to serve as the headquarters of his resuscitated O.T.O. Many initiations were performed, and a weekly celebration of the Gnostic Mass was soon established in the San Francisco Bay area. McMurtry, and other initiators chartered by him, established O.T.O. groups in many other areas in the United States and internationally. By 1985 O.T.O., by its own report, had more than seven hundred members in several different countries. In that year McMurtry, in failing health, successfully sued Motta in United States district court over the possession of the O.T.O. trademarks and copyrights.

He died in a Martinez, California convalescent hospital on the day that the U.S. court clerk released the text of the decision that set the seal on McMurtry's efforts to reestablish O.T.O. Since then O.T.O. had, by its own report, grown to over three thousand members in more than forty countries, although numbers have declined significantly over the last decade.

== Publications ==
- The O.T.O. Newsletter Vol. I, Nos. 1–4, May 1977 – March 1978
- Transcript of an interview with McMurtry about his early life, serialized in the Thelema Lodge Calendar, November 2000 – September 2001
- A comprehensive collection of 134 poems was published as "The Poetry of Grady Louis McMurtry" Red Flame No. 1, September 2001

== See also ==
- Members of Ordo Templi Orientis
