= Maplewood Flats Conservation Area =

Conservation area in Canada

- IUCN category V (protected landscape/seascape)
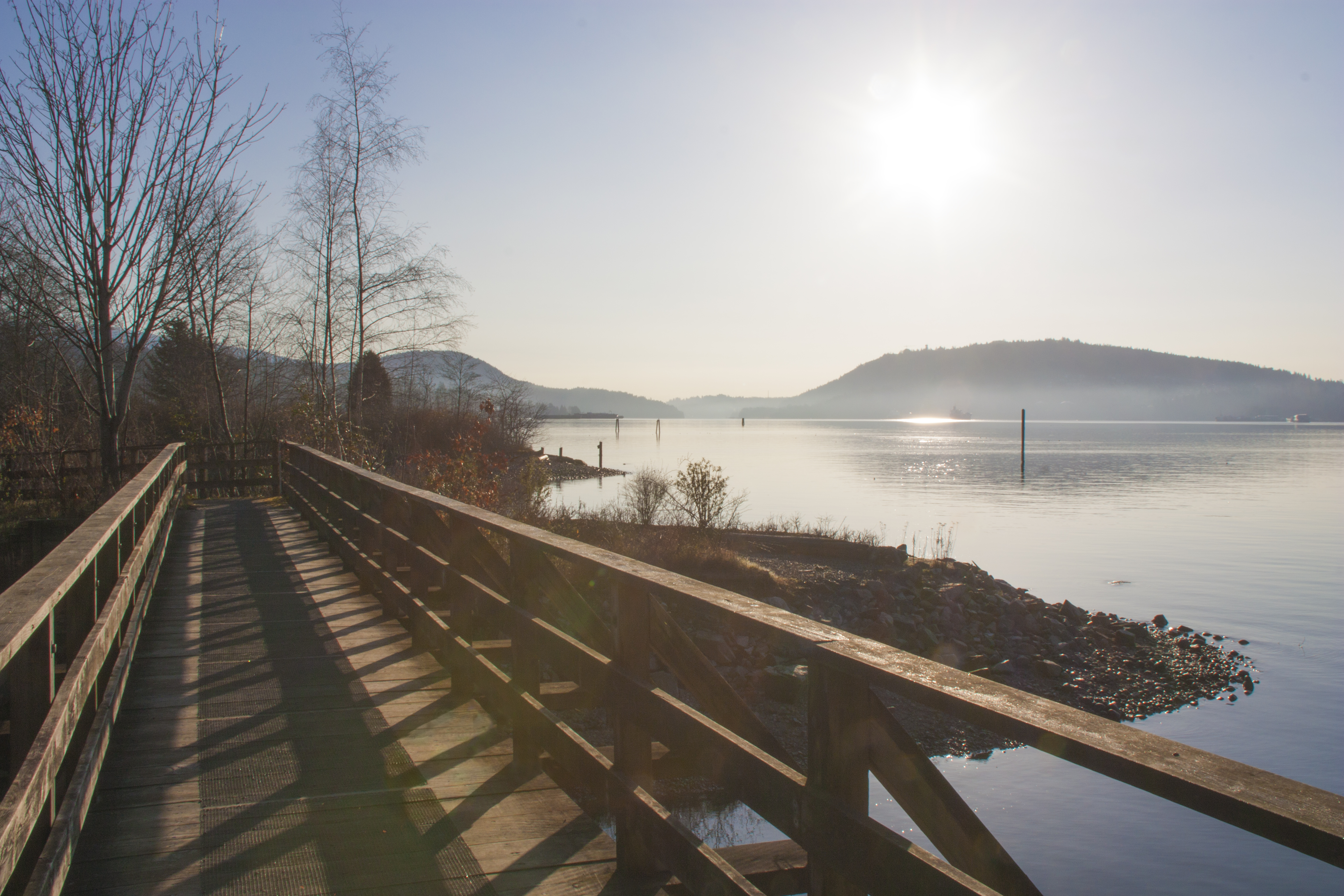
- Interactive map of Maplewood Flats Conservation Area
- Location: 2649 Dollarton Highway, North Vancouver, British Columbia, Canada
- Nearest city: Vancouver
- Coordinates: 49°18′22″N 123°0′18″W
- Area: 126 hectares (310 acres)
- Established: 1992
- Operator: The Wild Bird Trust of BC
- Owner: Port Metro Vancouver and North Vancouver

The Maplewood Flats Conservation Area is a 126 hectare (310 acre) conservation area located in North Vancouver, British Columbia, Canada. The area is composed of a 96 hectare (237 acre) intertidal zone of mudflats and salt marsh, and a 30 hectare (74 acre) upland area. It is preserved by Port Metro Vancouver as one of their ecological land initiatives. The land is located approximately 2 km east of the Second Narrows Bridge along Burrard Inlet in North Vancouver.

== History ==
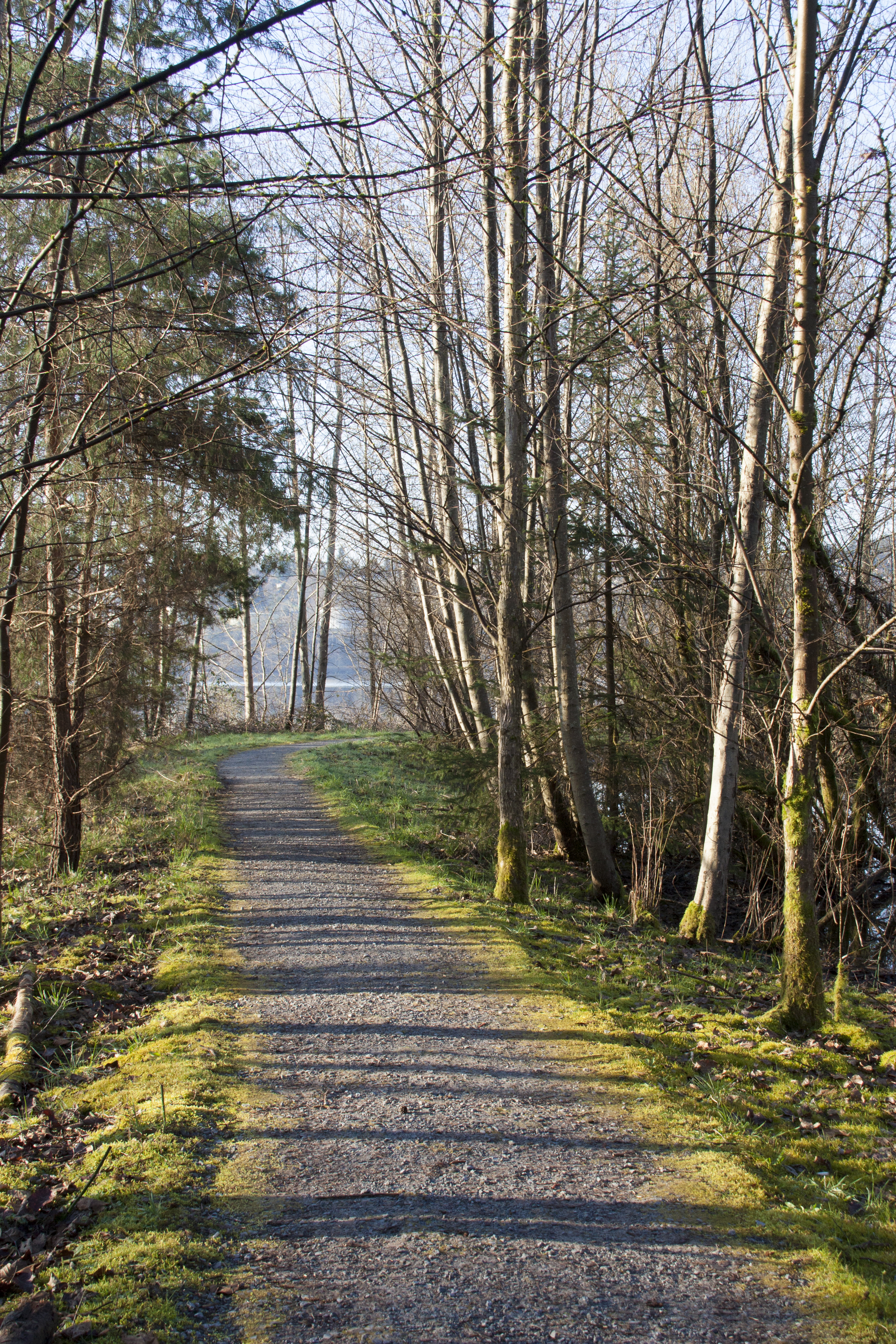
Maplewood flats path

In the 1940s, Maplewood Flats was inhabited by a community of squatters living in dilapidated cabins along the area's intertidal zone. One of the more prominent residents of the flats was English born poet and novelist Malcolm Lowry. Lowry was living in the flats while he wrote his novel Under the Volcano.

In the 1960s, the Maplewood Flats community was home to an assortment of individuals including artists, writers and displaced loggers that were drawn to its natural beauty and sought refuge from the increasingly urbanized city of Vancouver. Tensions between squatters and the residents of North Vancouver grew over the years and in December 1971 most of the mudflat cabins were burned down by civic authorities. The area was subsequently used as an industrial site.

In the 1980s, Maplewood Flats was designated as a conservation area by the district of North Vancouver.

In 1992, Vancouver Port Authority, who are the owners of the majority of the area, agreed to lease the flats to Environment Canada for 49 years to permit the land to be managed as a wildlife conservation area. The Wild Bird Trust, which was founded in 1993 by Dr. Richard C. Beard and Patricia M. Banning-Lover, were chosen to manage the area.

Through the lobbying of public interest groups, actions were initiated to restore Maplewood Flats back to its natural state. Landscape architect Patrick Mooney, designed all the major enhancement projects for Maplewood Flats, including the freshwater marsh. The projects were installed from 1995 to 2004. In 1997, the system was dedicated and is now a breeding ground for marsh wrens, common yellowthroats, wood ducks, American coots, blue-winged teal, red-winged blackbirds, pied-billed grebes, soras and virginia rails.

In 2006, under the Wild Bird Trust stewardship, Maplewood Flats became the leading breeding colony in British Columbia for the migratory purple martin.

In September 2012, the Wild Bird Trust secured long-term administration of the site until March 31, 2041.

=== Jurisdiction ===
The land is owned by Port Metro Vancouver and North Vancouver under lease to Environment Canada. The Wild Bird Trust of BC which is a non-profit membership based provincial organization, manages the area.

== In popular culture ==
In the early 1950s, Malcolm Lowry wrote the story "The Forest Path to the Spring" about Maplewood Flats, and the deep connection and sense of community he felt with the land and the residents living there.

In 2011 the David Suzuki Foundation created a short movie as part of their "Make Policy Live" mini series. In the short film, Professor Patrick Mooney who is the Chair of Landscape Architecture at The University of British Columbia, discusses how he transformed the former industrial site into a rehabilitated wetlands through use of a natural architectural landscaping process.

In July 2012, the District of North Vancouver and the North Vancouver Arts Office unveiled Ken Lum's sculptural installation titled "from shangri-la to shangri-la" (located behind the site office). The sculptures depict scale replicas of the squatters' cabins that were once located in Maplewood Flats in the 1940s.

== Biology and ecology ==
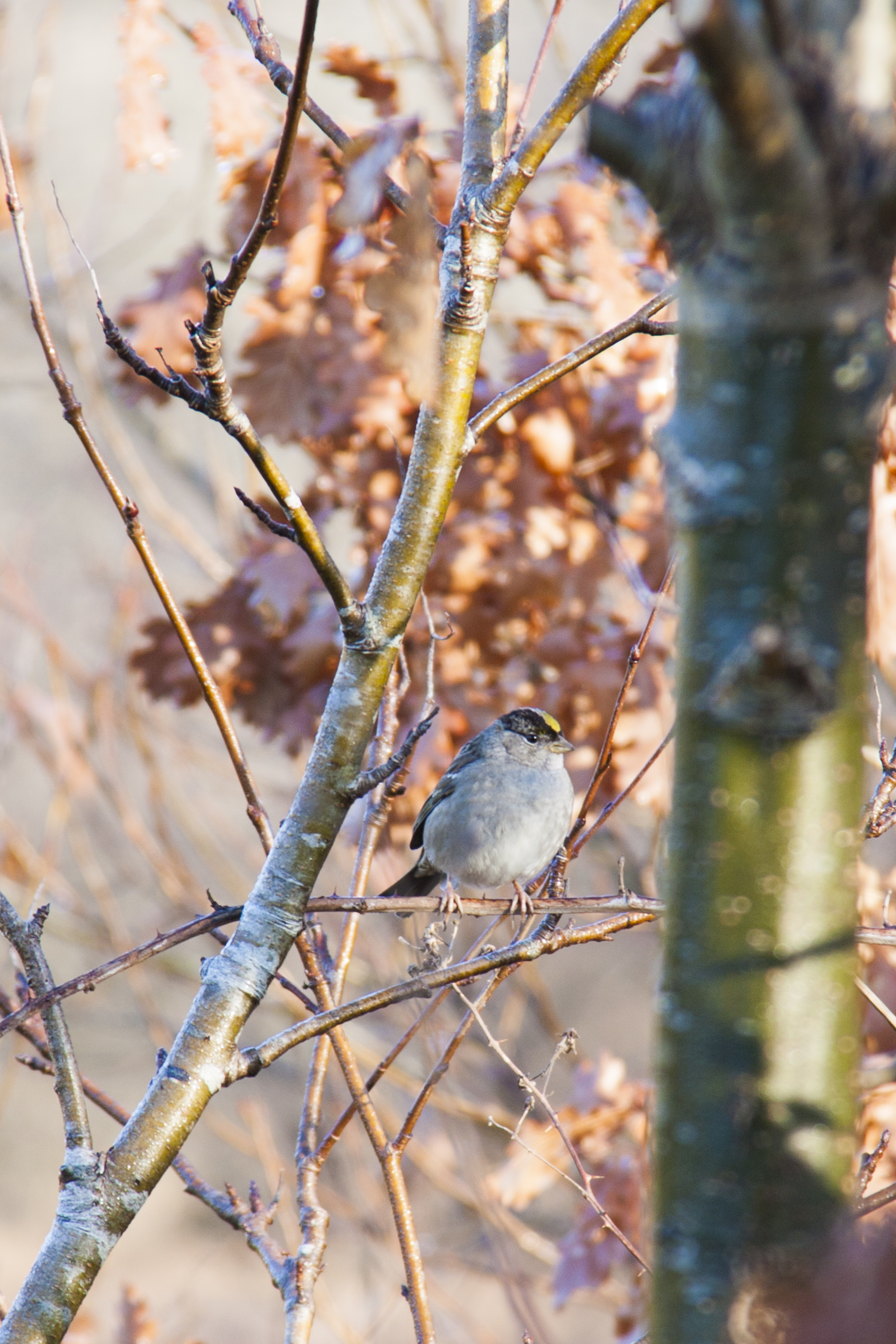
A bird at Maplewood flats

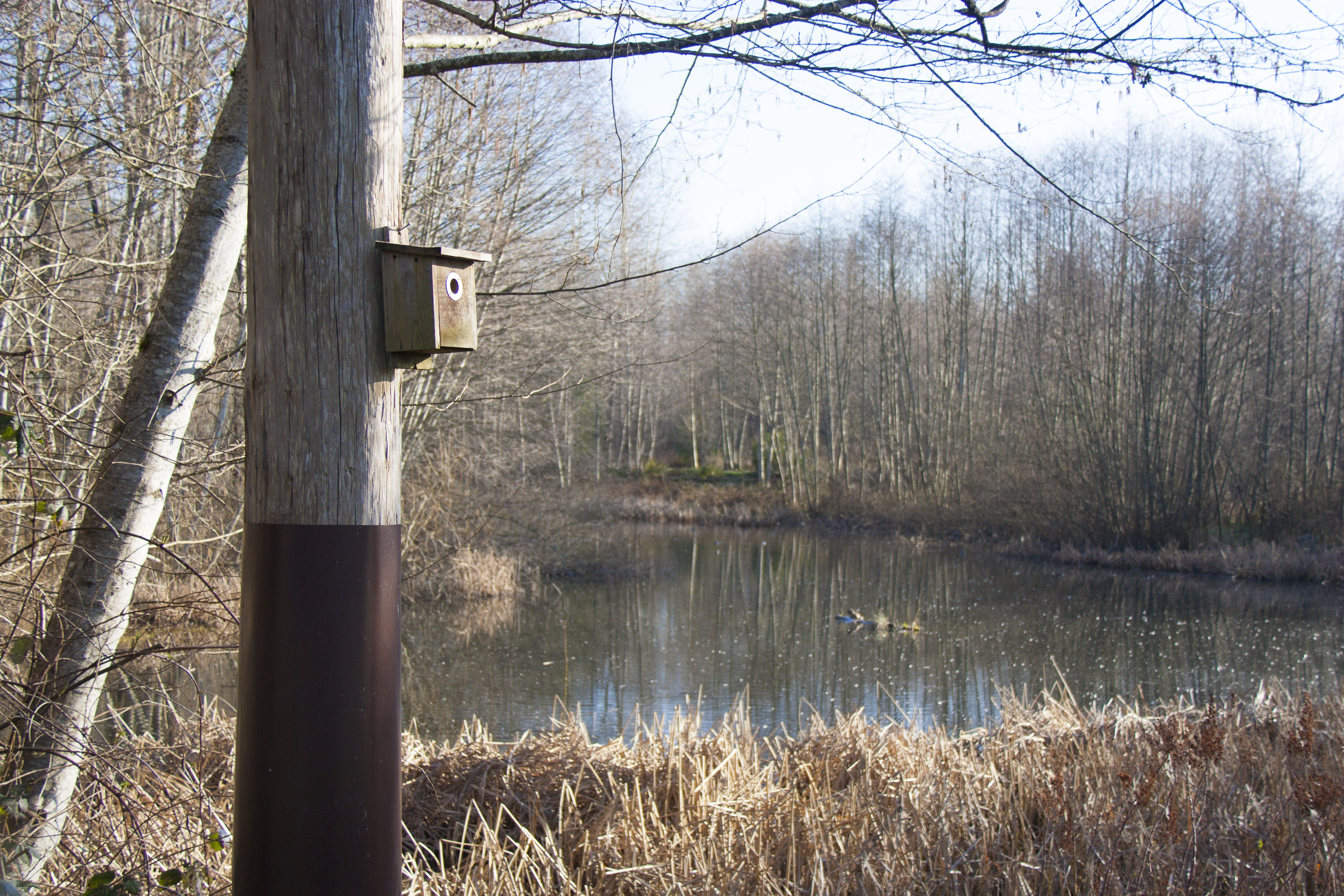
Purple martin nest box

Maplewood Flats is classified as a tidal flat, as a substantial portion of its area is exposed during low tide. The area is composed of deciduous trees (44%), old field, meadow, and wetland. Wild blackberry bushes can be found within the forest area of the flats. The sub-tidal region provides key resources for many species of fish such as salmon and invertebrates, and dungeness crab, because of its ideal conditions for eelgrass.

The conservation area is well known for its abundance in wildlife. It is located on the Pacific Flyway which is used by tens of thousands of migratory birds every year. 246 bird species have been spotted in this region. A few of the main types of birds commonly sighted in the area include waterfowl, shorebirds, raptors and passerines. In 1991 only one breeding pair of osprey inhabited the flats, in recent years the number has risen to four pairs. Bald eagles have also been known to nest in the area.

In 1985, the BC Purple Martin Stewardship and Recovery Program set out to re-establish the population of purple martins. This program was extremely successful with a total of 66 breeding pairs observed in the area in 2006.

Other commonly sighted animals include mammals such as black-tailed deer, coyotes, short-tailed weasels, raccoons and squirrels. Infrequent sightings of black bears, bobcats, river otters and sea lions have also been reported. Other species that have been reported in the park include the pacific tree frog, garter snakes and various species of butterflies.

=== Bird watching locations ===
There are seven distinct bird watching areas within the Maplewood Flats which are listed in order from the beginning of the walking trail to the end.

Bird watching areas
Bird Feeders at Main Entrance
First Mudflats Viewing Area
Second Mudflats Viewing Area
Osprey Point
Otter Point
Westernmost West Pond Lookout
Easternmost West Pond Lookout

== Recreation and facilities ==
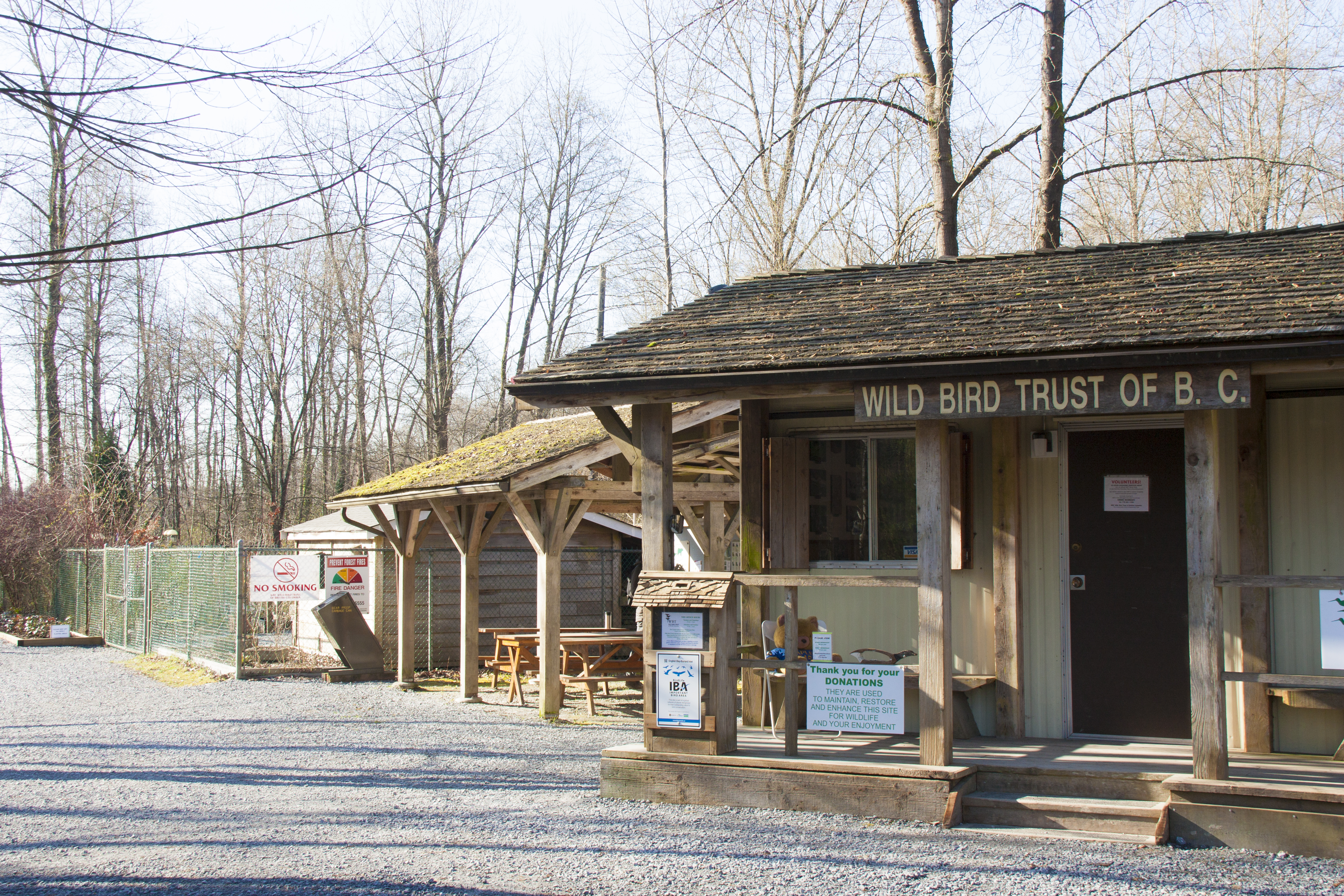
Visitor center

Maplewood flats boasts just over 3 km of well-kept wheelchair accessible trails. Occasional resting benches and a viewing platform are available allowing visitors to rest and observe the wildlife. The "Return of the Osprey" Festival is held by the Wild Bird Trust bi-annually to celebrate the nesting osprey who return every year to their nests within the flats. Educational sessions for private groups and schools are available through the Wild Bird Trust.

=== Access ===
The flats are located at 2645 Dollarton Highway (North Vancouver District). The area is vehicle-accessible with parking available along the road beside the park and within the designated parking area during operational hours. Translink route #212 or #C15 run to the 2500-block of the Dollarton Highway.
