= Jeanne Robert Foster =

American poet (1879–1970)

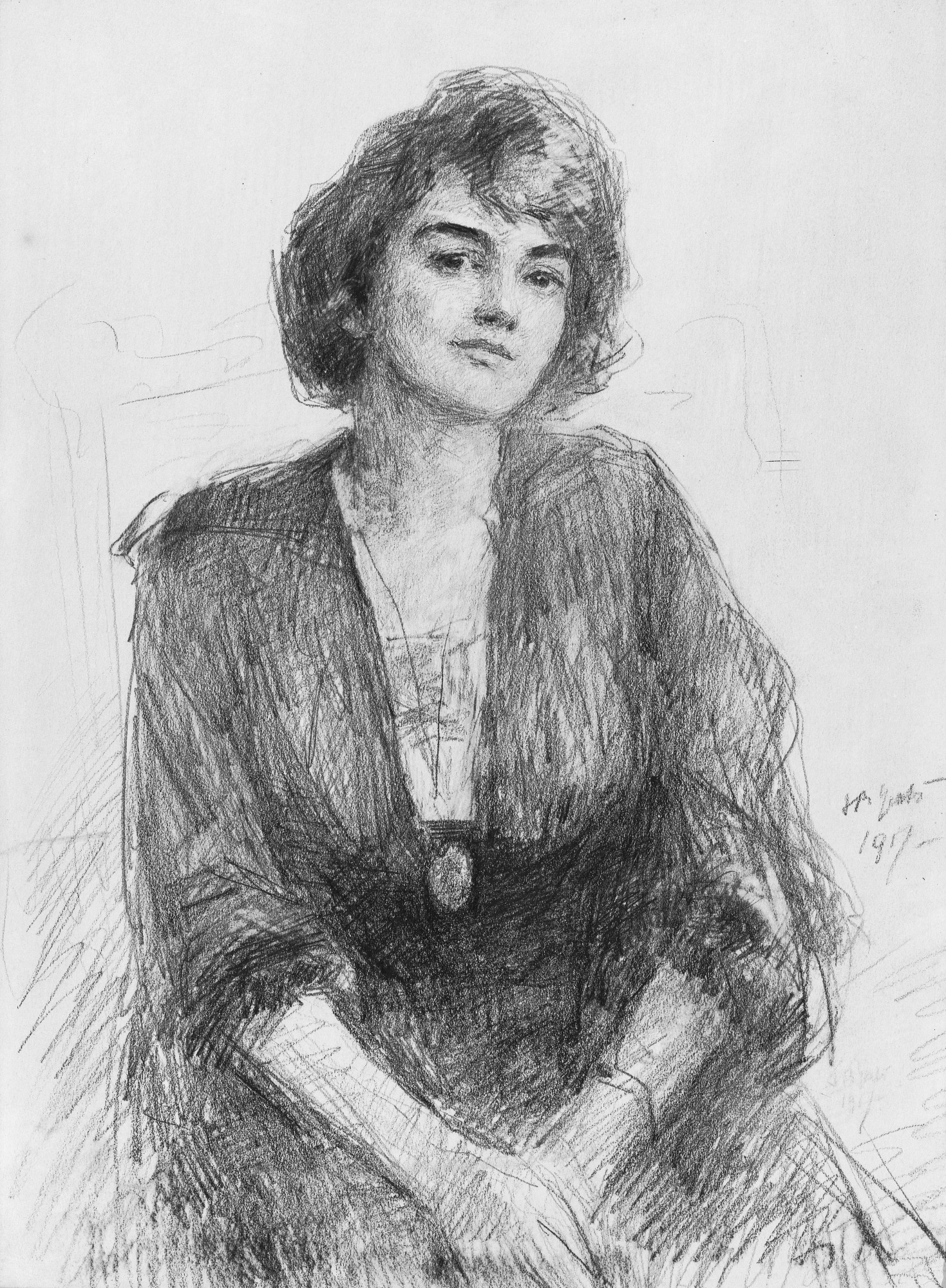
- Jeanne Robert Foster (John Butler Yeats, 1917)
- Born: Julia Elizabeth Oliver; March 10, 1879; Johnsburg, New York, U.S.
- Died: September 22, 1970 (aged 91)
- Education: Radcliffe College; Boston University
- Occupation: Poet
- Spouse: Matlock Foster (m. 1896)

Jeanne Robert Foster (née, Julia Elizabeth Oliver; March 10, 1879 – September 22, 1970) was an American occultist, Theosophist, and poet from the Adirondack Mountains. A disciple of Aleister Crowley, she was also known by the magical name Sister Hilarion.

Foster's friends included many of the period's leading authors and artists. She was particularly close to Ford Madox Ford, Ezra Pound, and William Butler Yeats.

== Early life and education ==
Julia Elizabeth Oliver was born in Johnsburg, New York, March 10, 1879. She studied drama at the Stanhope-Wheatcroft Dramatic School, and worked in magazine journalism. She attended Radcliffe College and Boston University simultaneously as a special student. Professor Charles Townsend Copeland of Harvard was her personal instructor for three years and was a strong influence.

== Marriage and modeling ==
In 1896, she married Matlock Foster. They lived first in Rochester, New York. She became a leading fashion model. In 1903, she was chosen as the "Harrison Fisher Girl". The couple then moved to Boston.

== Journalism and literary life ==
Foster continued to work as a journalist in Boston and then in New York, becoming literary editor of the American Review of Reviews. In 1913, the year of the Exhibition of Modern Art in New York, she wrote an article featuring Cézanne, Picasso, Derain, Seurat, and other modernists. This was at a time when defense of modern art brought forth hostile criticism. Through the publicity she received from the article, she became acquainted with John Quinn. Although she would become the dearest friend of Quinn's last years, at this stage she kept her distance because she had been warned Quinn was a dangerous man for a young woman to know.

In 1915, Foster met English occult writer Aleister Crowley, attracted by his connection to black magic. Despite her marriage, she began a relationship with him. She underwent initiation into Thelema, taking the magical name Sister Hilarion. She traveled with Crowley to Los Angeles on an inspection tour of Ordo Templi Orientis activities there. However, due to the strain of deceiving her husband, she left Crowley in L.A. and returned home.

In 1916, she began to publish narrative verse about the Adirondacks. Her books, Wild Apples and Neighbors of Yesterday, were published in 1916 followed by Rock Flower in 1923. A play, Marthe, won the Drama League prize in 1926. From this period she traveled in Europe, met important figures of modernism, and collaborated with the collector John Quinn on building up his contemporary art collection. In 1922, she accepted the American editorship of the Transatlantic Review, which was published simultaneously in New York and Paris and edited by Ford Madox Ford. After Quinn's death in 1924, Foster helped prepare the collection of his letters that became the John Quinn Memorial Collection at the New York Public Library. The collection includes an extensive correspondence with Joseph Conrad.

She loved Maine and spent time at a cottage there with her sister, Mrs. Theodore H. Smith of Detroit. Drawing on her knowledge of the conditions faced by elderly residents of the Adirondacks, Foster helped establish the first low-income housing for elderly people in New York State. In recognition of this work, she received the Schenectady Patroon Award in 1961.

== Legacy ==
Jeanne Robert Foster is buried near her friend John Butler Yeats, the painter and father of William Butler Yeats, in the Foster family plot in Chestertown Rural Cemetery in the Adirondacks.

Her own papers can be found in the Jeanne R. Foster-William M. Murphy Collection at the New York Public Library and at Harvard University’s Houghton Library, which holds her correspondence with poet and author Ezra Pound.

== Works ==
- Foster, Jeanne Robert (1916). Neighbors of Yesterday. Sherman.
- Foster, Jeanne Robert (1916). Wild Apples. Sherman.

Posthumous editions

- Foster, Jeanne Robert (1977). Shaw, Jeanne; Shaw, Darwin (eds.). Awakening Grace, Poems at the Feet of the Silent Master. North Myrtle Beach, NC: Sheriar Press. ISBN 978-0-913078-28-0.
- Foster, Jeanne Robert (1986). Riedinger-Johnson, Noel (ed.). Adirondack Portraits: A Piece of Time. Syracuse University Press. ISBN 978-0-8156-0205-7.

== See also ==
- List of Thelemites
