= C. F. Russell =

American occultist (1897–1987)

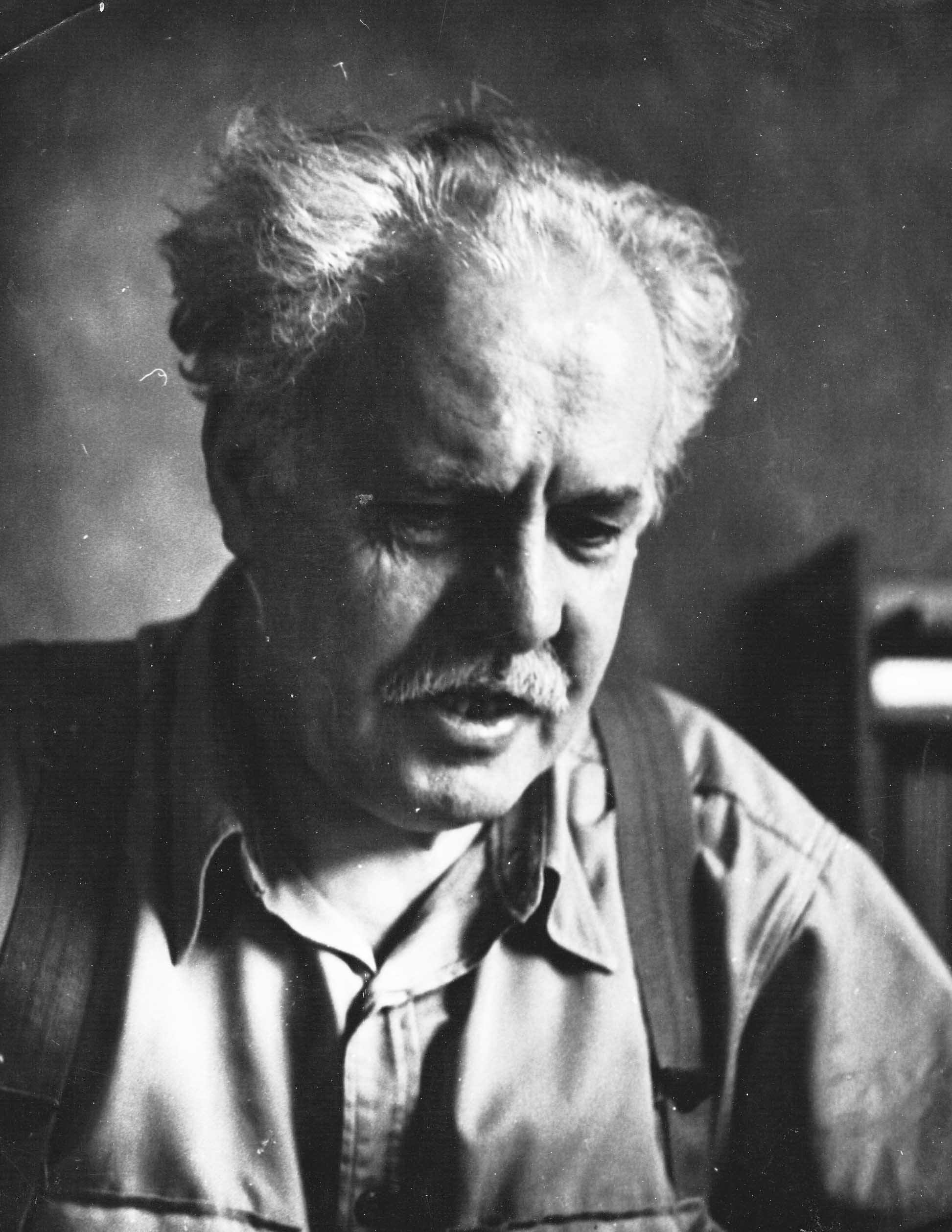
- "At his desk focus on his work, probably mathematics or writing"
- Born: Cecil Frederick Russell; June 19, 1897; Greenwood, Massachusetts
- Died: June 12, 1987 (aged 90); California
- Occupations: Occultist, writer
- Writing career
- Pen name: Frater Genesthai, Fiat Lux
- Language: English

Cecil Frederick Russell (1897–1987) was an American occultist and writer. Russell was a member of the A∴A∴ and Aleister Crowley's magical order, Ordo Templi Orientis. Russell later founded his own magical order, the Choronzon Club, which later changed its name to G.B.G. (variously explained as "Great Brotherhood of God" or "Gnostic Body of God").

== Early life ==
Russell was born in Greenwood, Massachusetts, on June 9, 1897; his family later moved to Orlando, Florida. At the age of 19, he enlisted in the U.S. Navy.

From April 22, 1917, to December 12, 1918, Russell worked as a hospital attendant at the U.S. Naval Academy Hospital. While serving as a Pharmacist Mate aboard the USS Reina Mercedes, Russell injected himself with cocaine, resulting in a dishonorable discharge from the US Navy.

Russell disputes this in his autobiography, stating he pretended so in hope of receiving a transfer to the medical facility, followed by a medical discharge. The war had ended, and Russell wished to unite with Crowley.

== Disciple of Crowley ==
In June 1918, Russell met Crowley in New York and was initiated into the third-degree of Crowley's magical order Ordo Templi Orientis. Russell took the magical name of Frater Genesthai.

From November 1920 to Autumn 1921, Russell lived at Crowley's abbey in Cefalu, Sicily. Crowley's diary records:

Now I'll shave and make up my face like the lowest kind of whore and rub on perfume and go after Genesthai [Russell] like a drunken two-bit prick-pit in old New Orleans. He disgusts me sexually, as I him, as I suspect…[T]he dirtier my deed, the dearer my darling will hold me; the grosser the act the greedier my arse to engulph him!

Russell's account of the magical working is in P.117-118 in Znuz is Znees volume 2.

== Founder of an order ==
In 1922, Russell founded the Choronzon Club, advertising it as a "short cut to initiation" in the pages of Occult Digest. In 1931, the group changed its name to G.B.G (for "Great Brotherhood of God" or "Gnostic Body of God") G.B.G was headquartered in Chicago. Russell received half of all initiation fees collected. The fees were used to support the neighborhoods.

Inspired by Ida Craddock, Russell developed his own curriculum of sex magick. In the 1960s, disciple Louis T. Culling published these in two works entitled The Complete Magickal Curriculum of the Secret Order G.'.B.'.G.'. and Sex Magick. The first two degrees, "Alphaism and Dianism", reportedly draw upon Ida Craddock's work Heavenly Bridegrooms Culling writes that Dianism is "sexual congress without bringing it to climax" and that each participant is to regard their partner not as a "known earthly personality" but as a "visible manifestation of one's Holy Guardian Angel.

In San Francisco, Russell was visited by fellow Thelemite Wilfred Talbot Smith. Unable to find work in Vancouver, Smith headed to Los Angeles, California. On the way he stopped in San Francisco, where he met with Cecil Frederick Russell, a Thelemite who had departed from the Crowleyan orthodoxy to found his own group, the Choronzon Club. Smith, however, disliked Russell, and later claimed that he had been unnerved when Russell began expressing a sexual interest in children. Many of Russell's followers would later join Smith's organization.

Russell was denounced by O.T.O. leader Crowley, who in a document dated April 15, 1934 described Russell as a "thief, swindler, and blackmailer".

In 1938, the GBG dissolved.

== Later life ==
In 1944, Russell published Provenance, described as "the only twentieth century occult text to center around the subject of book-collecting". From 1970 to 1972, Russell published his memoirs entitled Znuz is Znees: Memoirs of a Magician. He died in 1987.

== Selected works ==
- Book chameleon: A new version in verse. (1940)
- Provenance (1944)
- Barbara Cubed: The manual of pure logic (1944)
- Tropermic calculus (1944)
- Grammar of changes (1944)
- Manual of Electro-combinational Engineering (1945)
- Znuz is Znees: Memoirs of a magician (1970)

== See also ==
- List of Thelemites
- Members of Ordo Templi Orientis
