= William Breeze =

American occult writer

- Ὑμεναιος β
- Title: Outer Head (Frater Superior) and Caliph (international leader) of "Caliphate" O.T.O.; Sovereign Patriarch and Primate of Ecclesia Gnostica Catholica (E.G.C.)

Personal life
- Born: William Breeze; 1955 (age 70–71)
- Citizenship: United States
- Education: Harvard University
- Other name: Hymenaeus Beta
- Occupation: Author, musician, priest, human rights campaigner

Religious life
- Religion: Thelema
- Denomination: Gnostic Catholic Church
- Order: Ordo Templi Orientis
- Lineage: Official church succession
- Consecration: August 12, 1974 by E.G.C. bishop Jack Hogg

Senior posting
- Period in office: 1986–present

William Breeze (born 1955), also known by his neo-Gnostic bishop title of Tau Silenus, is an American writer and publisher on magick and philosophy. He is the Sovereign Patriarch, or supreme governing cleric, of Ecclesia Gnostica Catholica (E.G.C.), the liturgical arm of Ordo Templi Orientis (O.T.O.), of which he is the current Outer Head of the Order (OHO), also known as Frater Superior, as well as caliph, the order's international leader. In this capacity he is a leading editor of the occult works of Aleister Crowley, the founder of the philosophy and religion of Thelema, who is regarded as its prophet.

Under the name Hymenaeus Beta he is the second caliph to lead the traditional, orthodox, or "Caliphate" OTO (as opposed to the derivative organizations the Typhonian Order (formerly known as the Typhonian O.T.O.) of Kenneth Grant and the Society O.T.O. of Marcelo Ramos Motta), and is the direct successor of Grady McMurtry (Hymenaeus Alpha), who was the first of the caliphs and second of the overall leaders, or Outer Heads—directly after Crowley's immediate successor Karl Germer—to follow after Crowley in his role as leader of the order.

McMurtry served as caliph from 1978, when he re-founded the defunct O.T.O., until 1985 and Breeze has served as caliph from 1986 until the present.

Caliph was a designation given to McMurtry by Crowley in relation to the continuing office OHO of O.T.O., of which Crowley was the ultimate religious head after taking over leadership of the order from its founder Theodore Reuss in 1923. According to Crowley, caliph is the elected spiritual and organizational worldwide leader of O.T.O. and is his successor. A lineage of caliphs carrying religious and organisational significance were designated by Crowley. The caliphs, as successors to Crowley, lead the order after his death.

== Early life and career ==
Breeze came from a military family. Son of a US Army serviceman, he was born in Paris, France, where his father, Colonel Breeze, was on a tour of duty. Breeze spent his childhood accompanying his father, who had a distinguished military career, on many tours of duty across the United States, staying with him at various US military bases, including Fort Meade, Nellis Air Force Base, and Fort Bragg. In the 1970s Breeze studied literature at Harvard University.

In late 1970s, Breeze helped to publish Aleister Crowley's Magical and Philosophical Commentaries on The Book of the Law; Breeze was co-owner of the publishing company, 93 Publishing.

== O.T.O. succession ==
In 1979, when Breeze was 24 years old, he met Grady McMurtry. Ten years earlier, McMurtry and his wife, known as Soror Meral, had re-established Ordo Templi Orientis by invoking the emergency orders from Crowley given to McMurtry in the "Caliphate letters", which gave McMurtry authority (subject to previous OHO's approval) to "take charge of the whole work of the Order in California to reform the Order". In 1982 McMurtry granted Breeze a charter to form an Ordo Templi Orientis lodge in Canada. In 1983, Breeze founded Phoenix lodge in Montreal becoming a Master of it.

McMurtry served as the head of Ordo Templi Orientis until his death in 1985. In that year, Breeze succeeded McMurtry as Acting Outer Head of OTO, after all active IX-degree members met in order to elect McMurtry's successor. He was nominated by Helen Parsons Smith, a widow of Wilfred Talbot Smith, who was a founder of Agape Lodge.

== Gnostic Catholic Church ==
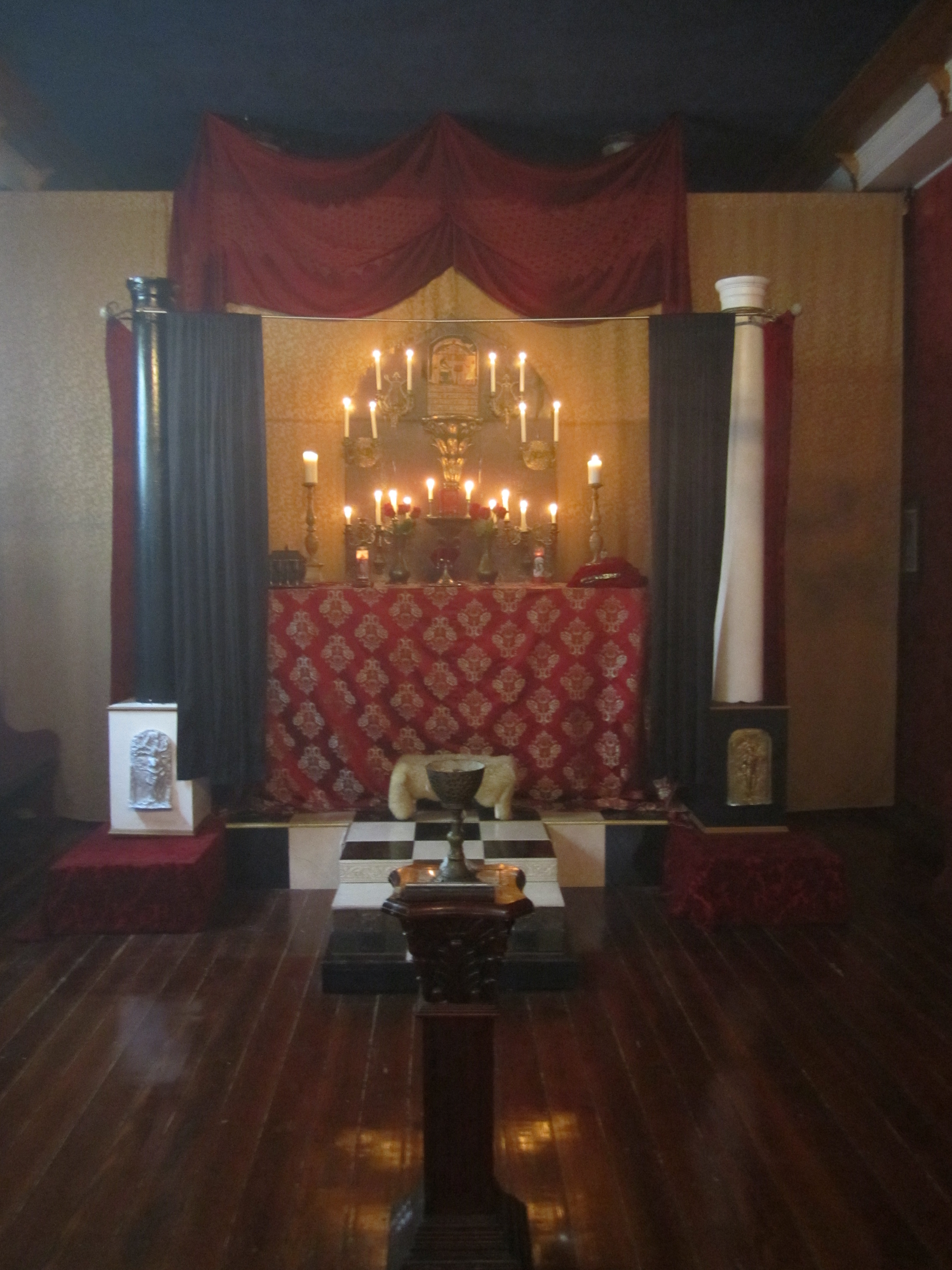
Photograph of the O.T.O.'s Gnostic Mass Temple located in Bywater, New Orleans.

=== Apostolic succession ===
In 1986, Breeze succeeded McMurtry as the Patriarch of Ecclesia Gnostica Catholica, the liturgical arm of O.T.O. As a contemporary occult Church, it exists as an integral part of OTO. During McMurtry's governance of OTO in the 1970s, the Gnostic Catholic Church and OTO functioned as separate organisations. In 1986, Breeze co-joined the separate Gnostic Catholic Church with OTO. Under his leadership, the Church has expanded greatly, growing in several countries.

=== E.G.C. lineage ===
Breeze was consecrated by E.G.C.'s bishop Jack Hogg as Tau Silenus on August 12, 1974. Hogg was a bishop of the Gnostic Church of Thelema whose lineage could be traced directly to J. Doinel, one of the founders of the Gnostic tradition, who also consecrated Aleister Crowley.

=== International work ===
Starting in 2005, Breeze begun chartering new international Grand Lodges, including those of Australia and United Kingdom, the latter covering England, Scotland, Wales, and Northern Ireland, plus British Crown Dependencies. Despite the O.T.O. formalising itself with regulations and policies, Breeze allowed the leadership in local areas the freedom to experiment with tactics for growing the organisation.

In England, several new O.T.O. and E.G.C. bodies were chartered by the United Kingdom Grand Lodge, including lodges and camps in Bristol, Hastings and Leeds.

On October 10, 2014, Breeze was unanimously re-elected de jure Outer Head of the Order by a council of Grand Masters. On May 16, 2015, the organisation celebrated 30 years of his governing of OTO.

== A∴A∴ ==
Motta's A∴A∴ movement was first formally announced in early January 1976, when Motta's edition of the Commentaries of AL with introduction by James Wasserman went to print. Motta was a disciple of Karl Germer whom he met in 1953 and his A∴A∴ work was also supervised by Germer. Motta, in turn, took on his own students, including James Wasserman and J. Daniel Gunther, both of whom he expelled from the order.

After his election as the Outer Head of the O.T.O. in 1985, Breeze sought to rebuild the A∴A∴ so that both orders could again operate in the way Crowley intended. Having spent the years immediately following his election giving most of his attention to the O.T.O. activity, in the summer of 1992, together with J. Daniel Gunther who was involved exclusively with the A∴A∴, and other students of Marcelo Motta, Breeze renewed the A∴A∴ activity which at that point was dormant.

The revived A∴A∴ began to grow. with the subsequent publications of The Equinox journal, newly typeset in authorised format with exhaustive editorial work by Breeze himself, along with assistance of other O.T.O. and A∴A∴ members, which was issued jointly by the O.T.O. and the A∴A∴, starting with The Equinox Vol IV, No. 1 and 2 published in 1996.

=== The Holy Books of Thelema ===
Under his name as Frater Superior of the O.T.O., Hymenaeus Beta, Breeze is known as the preeminent editor of The Equinox journal, issued jointly by the O.T.O. and the A∴A∴, and the commentaries on the Holy Books of Thelema.

On April 10, 1982, Breeze and McMurtry began producing a new edition of The Holy Books of Thelema, which was published by Weiser Books in April 1983. Breeze did the design and editorial work, and James Wasserman handled typesetting and the layout, production and proofreading. The Holy Books of Thelema were originally published in 1909 by Crowley under the title "ΘΕΛΗΜΑ" in three small books that Crowley had put out privately for the A∴A∴ members. The previous edition by Israel Regardie was published in 1972 with Sangrael Press but was out-of-print.

The 1996 edition of The Law is for All (a collection of Crowley's commentary on The Book of the Law) edited by Breeze is based upon the original manuscript of Louis Wilkinson and has an introduction by the material's original editor. It includes annotations, reading lists and indexes not found in the earlier edition.

In May 2013, Breeze made available his own research, undertaken for the definitive edition of Liber Legis.

=== The Equinox ===
During the summer of 1982, Equinox Vol. III, No. 10, edited by Breeze, went to press, featuring the core O.T.O. documents. Breeze also added a number of A∴A∴ papers, along with letters from Magick Without Tears, the text of The Book of the Law, and various other writings by Crowley, Wilfred Talbot Smith, and Frater Achad, also featuring James Wasserman's essay on the history of the O.T.O. Breeze wrote an extensive introduction and showcased a group of contemporary Thelemic poets and artists, along with a section on Kenneth Anger's films.

In 1996, Breeze's edition of The Equinox Vol. IV, No. 1: Commentaries on the Holy Books and Other Papers, went to press. It included number of previously unpublished pieces in the Equinox series, including Liber LXV's commentary, and a colour reproduction of Crowley's illumination of Liber Pyramidos. Its main feature, Liber Cordis Cincte Serpente (Liber LXV) is considered to be one of the Holy Books of Thelema. It includes Crowley's commentary, which, unlike in the earlier editions, was positioned opposite and facing the corresponding text of Liber LXV. Breeze's edition also includes other works of Crowley and shorter commentaries which have not been published before, including Charles Stansfeld Jones' commentary on Liber A'ash (written by him as an A∴A∴ assignment, and then annotated by Crowley), and other commentaries Breeze included to aid the aspirants within the system of the magical Order of the A∴A∴ in the attainment of the Knowledge and Conversation of the Holy Guardian Angel, and the grade of Adeptus Minor. It contains reprinted documents important in defining the A∴A∴ training system, including Crowley's works such as One Star in Sight, Liber XIII, and Liber CLXXXV, to which this book adds An Account of the A∴A∴ introduced by Crowley's essay titled Occultism published for the first time, including one unpublished version of the A∴A∴ Student Examination. It also contains a large colour plate section including a colour reproduction of Crowley's original illuminated manuscript of Liber Pyramidos and paintings by J. F. C. Fuller dealing with A∴A∴ teachings. These paintings have been used as the covers of the edition.

In 1998, Breeze's edition of The Equinox Vol. IV, No. 2 went to press. It contains the fourth major edition of Liber 418 (The Vision and the Voice), considered by Crowley to be second in importance behind The Book of the Law, which established the religious system of Thelema. Previous major edition of The Vision and the Voice was published by Israel Regardie in 1972 and had been out of print. Breeze's 1998 edition, which includes Crowley's commentary as footnotes, made the material of Liber 418 available to a large audience for the first time.

== Editorial work ==
Devoting much of his time in administering the Order, Breeze also devoted a lot of time to development of the corpus of Thelemic literature and preservation of OTO's archival heritage. Under Breeze, OTO's publishing efforts have undergone a process of standardisation, and many previously unpublished works have been made available through Breeze's meticulous editorial efforts. However, no new publishing activity has occurred for more than a decade. The last notice of upcoming publications was in an OTO newsletter dated 2013, and none of the promised volumes have yet appeared.

=== Other significant works ===
In 1990 Breeze undertook research for the definitive edition of Crowley's Confessions, becoming the biography's co-editor. This edition is yet to be published as of 2020.

In 1991 Breeze published an edition of Liber Aleph vel CXI: The Book of Wisdom or Folly (93 Publishing, New York), which was a reissue of 1962 edition published by Thelema Publishing Co. Liber Aleph was written in New York City at the end of the First World War and is considered one of the most important commentaries on Crowley's teachings, conceptually written as if to Crowley's magical child, in the style of books fathers used to write for their children, with hereditary spirit of medieval grimoires. The text of Liber Aleph has been described by Crowley as an extended and elaborate commentary on The Book of the Law.

In 1994, he became the editor of the second edition of Book 4, Liber ABA published by Weiser Books. Through editorial notes, Breeze enabled the reader to trace much of the evolution of Crowley's thoughts through successive revisions of the Magick in Theory and Practice manuscript.

=== Editorial assistance ===
In his capacity of head of OTO, Breeze helped many investigators such as Lawrence Sutin (author of Do What Thou Wilt: A Life of Aleister Crowley published in 2000, ISBN 978-0312288976), Richard Kaczynski (author of Perdurabo: Life of Aleister Crowley published in 2010 by North Atlantic Books, ISBN 978-1556438998), Tobias Churton (author of Aleister Crowley: The Biography published by Watkins Books in 2012, ISBN 978-1780281346), and Anthony Clayton (author of Netherwood: Last Resort of Aleister Crowley published by Weiser Antiquarian Books in 2012, ISBN 978-0957233409), to study OTO, Thelema, Aleister Crowley and related topics using the materials OTO is the guardian of.

== Helping former members of Agape Lodge ==
Throughout his career, Breeze helped several former members of Agape Lodge, including Marjorie Cameron and Helen Parsons Smith to publish their works on Thelema and magic, acting as co-editor of their works.

=== Friendship with Helen Parsons Smith ===
Helen Parsons Smith was a founding member of Agape Lodge along with her first husband Jack Parsons and Wilfred Talbot Smith, whom she would marry after Parsons's death. She was also the sister of Scientology founder's wife Sara Northrup Hollister. Breeze first came in contact with her when he worked with Peter Macfarlane who ran 93 Publishing, a small publishing company in Canada where Smith's deceased second husband used to live. Parsons Smith asked for Breeze's help and assistance with publishing of some of Crowley's limited edition works which she was gifted during her membership of Agape Lodge and her marriage to Jack Parsons. She became good friends with Breeze and was later instrumental in Outer Head of The Order elections, nominating Breeze as the candidate to head the Order after passing of Grady McMurtry.

=== Friendship with Marjorie Cameron ===
Los Angeles artist and occultist Marjorie Cameron was Breeze's close friend. On February 10, 2015, Breeze chaired a panel discussion dedicated to Cameron and her work, which was held at Los Angeles Museum of Contemporary Art.

=== Editor of Jack Parsons' literary works ===
In the 1980s, Breeze, together with Marjorie Cameron, acted as co-editor of a compilation of essays authored by Jack Parsons' who was a rocket scientist and founding member of Agape Lodge. In 1980 Freedom is a Two-Edged Sword collection of essays was published by New Falcon Publications, presenting Parsons thoughts on magic and initiation(ISBN 9781561841165). In 2008 Breeze acted as editor of Jack Parsons' Three Essays on Freedom published by Teitan Press(ISBN 978-0-933429-11-6).

== Esoteric art ==
In his capacity of Frater Superior of OTO, Breeze advised several American museums and exhibitions on esoteric art. In February 2016, Breeze co-chaired "Occult and Art" panel discussion which took place at 80WSE Gallery in New York with Professor Susan L. Aberth and artist Jesse Bransford co-chairing the panel. The panel discussed various artists and occultists, including Aleister Crowley, whose paintings were exhibited amongst other modern and contemporary artists who have each expressed their own engagement in magical practice.

== Literary works ==
=== As author ===
Under his name as Frater Superior of the O.T.O., Hymenaeus Beta, Breeze has written extensively on magic and Thelemic initiation in various occult periodicals, including The Magical Link and texts entitled Culture Versus Cult contained within The Equinox Vol 3 No. 10, published in 1990. His editorial forewords include prolegomenon to Liber Aleph Vel CXI: The Book of Wisdom or Folly, preface to Initiation in the Aeon of the Child: The Inward Journey written by J. Daniel Gunther (published in 2014, ISBN 978-0892542093), as well as editorial introduction to Magick: Liber ABA, Book Four (ISBN 978-0877289197) and introduction to Aleister Crowley's edition of The Goetia, which explores the relationship between Crowley and Samuel Liddell MacGregor Mathers, and the importance of the Lesser Key of Solomon in the grimoire tradition.

=== As editor ===
- The Equinox, Volume III, Number 10, 1990, Weiser Books. ISBN 978-0877287193
- The Equinox, Volume III, Number VI, 1991, Weiser Books. ISBN 978-0877287292
- The Equinox, Volume IV, Number 1, 1996, Weiser Books. ISBN 978-0877288886
- The Equinox, Volume IV, Number 2, 1998, Weiser Books. ISBN 978-0877289067
- The Equinox of the Gods, New Falcon Publications.
- The Heart of the Master & Other Papers, Thelema Media. ISBN 978-1561840304
- The Law is for All, Thelema Media. ISBN 978-5988821113
- The Revival of Magick and Other Essays by Aleister Crowley. New Falcon, 1998. ISBN 978-1-56184-133-2.
- Magick: Liber ABA: Book 4. Weiser Books. ISBN 978-0877289197
- The General Principles of Astrology. Weiser Books. ISBN 978-1578632886
- Diary of a Drug Fiend. Red Wheel/Weiser.ISBN 0933429118
- Freedom is a Two-Edged Sword, co-edited with Marjorie Cameron, authored by Jack Parsons, 1989, New Falcon Publications
- Three Essays on Freedom, authored by Jack Parsons, 2008, Teitan Press. ISBN 978-0-933429-11-6

== Musical career ==
As a musician, Breeze came to prominence in the late 1990s. In the early years of his musical career, he worked with poet-percussionist and Velvet Underground cofounder Angus MacLise. Breeze played electric viola, mandolin, guitar, bass and electronics. Footage of Breeze performing alongside Maclise was shown at the exhibition Dreamweapon: The Art and Life of Angus MacLise (1938–1979) from May 10–29, 2011 curated by Johan Kugelberg and Will Swofford Cameron.

=== Collaborations ===
Breeze has played with Psychic TV and appears on the recordings Thee Fractured Garden (1995), Cold Blue Torch (1995), Trip Reset (1996) and Spatial Memory (1996) and is mostly credited as playing viola and viola synthesizer.

==== Coil ====
Breeze was a member of Coil as an electric viola player from 1997 through 2000. Coil was a British avant garde music band founded by John Balance and Peter Christopherson whose main studio was based in London and from 1999 in Bristol. Starting in 1997, Breeze played electric viola and guitar on Coil's Equinox and Solstice EPs (later compiled as "Moon's Milk in Four Phases" and the accompanying limited bonus mail order only EP recorded in 1999), and played live with the band onstage during their Barcelona concert in 2000.

==== Current 93 ====
Breeze has also appeared live as a member of Current 93, an experimental music group founded by David Tibet. His first appearance with the band was on the 3rd of May 1997 at the Union Chapel in London, where Breeze first met John Balance of Coil. Balance also appeared onstage with the band.

== Charity work ==
Breeze supports numerous non-profit organisations which promote the human rights and religious liberty of religious minorities as well as campaign for religious freedom and freedom of belief. He made a significant contribution to enhancing religious freedom internationally through various means such as creation of public and private spaces for positive inter-faith exchanges.

== Religious office succession ==
Religious titles
Preceded by Grady McMurtry	Patriarch of Ecclesia Gnostica Catholica; 1986–present	Succeeded by incumbent
Preceded by Grady McMurtry	Outer Head of Ordo Templi Orientis; 1986–present	Succeeded by incumbent

== See also ==
- Esotericism
- Hermeticism
- Hermetic Qabalah
- Members of Ordo Templi Orientis
