= The Book of Thoth (Crowley) =

1944 book by Aleister Crowley

- Author: Aleister Crowley
- Language: English
- Series: The Equinox
- Release number: III (5)
- Publisher: Ordo Templi Orientis
- Publication date: March 21, 1944
- Publication place: United Kingdom
- Media type: Print
- Pages: 288
- ISBN: 978-0-87728-950-0
- Preceded by: Eight Lectures on Yoga
- Followed by: The Book of Wisdom or Folly

The Book of Thoth: A Short Essay on the Tarot of the Egyptians is the title of The Equinox, volume III, number 5, by English occult writer Aleister Crowley. The publication date is recorded as the vernal equinox of 1944 (an Ixviii Sol in 0° 0' 0" Aries, March 21, 1944 e. v. 5:29 p.m.) and was originally published in an edition limited to 200 numbered and signed copies.

== Overview ==
The Book of Thoth explores the symbolism, philosophy, and practical use of the Thoth Tarot, a deck conceived by occultist Aleister Crowley and painted by Lady Frieda Harris between 1938 and 1943. The deck draws upon a wide range of esoteric systems, including ceremonial magic, astrology, alchemy, the Book of Thoth in Egyptian mythology, and the religious philosophy of Thelema, which Crowley founded. It is known for its rich symbolic complexity and integration of Hermetic Qabalah.

The original signed limited edition was bound in Moroccan leather and printed on pre-wartime paper. Crowley sold £1,500 worth of the edition (equal to £86,342 in 2026) in less than three months.

== Content ==
The book is divided into four major parts:

- Part One: The Theory of the Tarot.
- Part Two: The Atu (Keys or Trumps).
- Part Three: The Court Cards.
- Part Four: The Small Cards.

Part One is further divided into three chapters; Part Two into two chapters and an appendix; Part Three into one chapter; and Part Four into one chapter. The book includes a list of plates depicting the Tarot cards as seen by Crowley and Harris.

There is an Appendix A: the use of the Tarot in the Art of Divination; and an Appendix B which includes the obiter dictum: "the 'correspondences' are not arbitrary". Appendix B also includes the Key Scale of the Tree of Life with the conic sections of mathematics and a diagram attributing the trigrams of the I Ching to the ten Sephirot.

== Notable editions ==
- "The Book of Thoth". The Equinox. III (5). London: Ordo Templi Orientis. 1944.
- The Book of Thoth: A Short Essay on the Tarot of the Egyptians. New York: Samuel Weiser. 1969.

== See also ==
- Aleister Crowley bibliography
- Karl Germer
