= James Wasserman =

American writer (1948–2020)

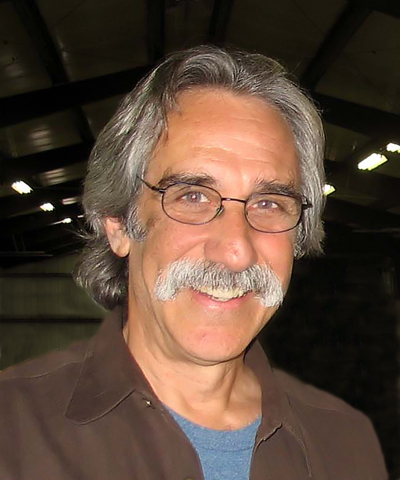
- Born: 23 June 1948; New Jersey, United States
- Died: 18 November 2020 (aged 72)
- Occupation(s): Writer and occultist

James Wasserman (23 June 1948 – 18 November 2020) was an American writer and occultist. A member of Ordo Templi Orientis since 1976 and a book designer by trade, he wrote extensively on spiritual and political liberty.

== Publishing career ==
Wasserman began working in 1973 at Weiser Books, then the world’s largest bookstore and publishing company to specialize in esoteric literature. While working at Weiser, he met and befriended filmmakers and occultists Harry Smith and Alejandro Jodorowsky. Wasserman worked with Brazilian occultist Marcelo Ramos Motta to publish the Commentaries of AL in 1975, for which he wrote the introduction. Additionally, he supervised the 1976 Weiser publication of The Book of the Law, the first popular edition to append the holograph manuscript to the typeset text. In 1977, Wasserman arranged to professionally re-photograph Frieda Harris' Tarot paintings for use in an improved second edition of Aleister Crowley's Thoth Tarot deck, and also wrote the instruction booklet.

Wasserman left Weiser in 1977 to found Studio 31, where he produced the Simon Necronomicon, a volume purporting to be the mythological Necronomicon made famous by H. P. Lovecraft. In 2008, it was reissued in a high-quality 31st anniversary edition by Ibis Press. In 1994, Wasserman assembled a team of scholars, photographers, and editorial staff to produce a full-color version of The Egyptian Book of the Dead featuring the Papyrus of Ani as discussed in In the Center of the Fire. His edition of the Book of the Dead was described as offering "much of value in presentation, layout and commentary" by John Baines, professor of Egyptology at the University of Oxford.

In 2014, the Twentieth Anniversary Edition was completed, revised and expanded, adding: "Thoughts on this Twentieth Anniversary Edition" by James Wasserman; "Coming Forth Into the Day" by J. Daniel Gunther; and "An Annotated Bibliography and Study Guide" by Dr. Ogden Goelet. This new edition includes some corrections and improvements to the color plates, and was completely recreated in electronic format.

== Ordo Templi Orientis ==
A member of O.T.O. since 1976, Wasserman founded one of its oldest lodges, Tahuti Lodge, in New York City in 1979. He played a key role within the Order in publishing the literary corpus of Aleister Crowley. In 1983, he worked with two other members of O.T.O. to produce The Holy Books of Thelema, a collection of Crowley’s Class A (inspired) writings. In 1986, his essay “An Introduction to the History of the O.T.O.” appeared in The Equinox III, No. 10. In 2009, he and his wife Nancy published To Perfect This Feast, a performance commentary on the Gnostic Mass. Revised for a second edition in 2010, the book is now in its third and final edition, published 2013. Wasserman is described by Dan Burstein as "a founder of the modern Ordo Templi Orientis” in his guide to Dan Brown's novel Angels & Demons. In 2012, Wasserman wrote In the Center of the Fire, an extensive account of his own experiences in the development of the modern O.T.O.

In 2015, he designed and produced a collection of essays for Ordo Templi Orientis published as Success Is Your Proof: One Hundred Years of O.T.O. in North America: A Festschrift in Honor of Hymenaeus Beta, Celebrating Thirty Years of Leadership. He contributed an essay entitled "The New Aeon in the New World: The Law of Liberty in the Wild West." Eleven other ranking members of the Order contributed essays on a wide range of topics such as Thelemic doctrine, magical practices, Order history, and biographical treatments.

== Works ==
=== As writer ===
- "Introduction" in Motta, Marcelo (1975). The Commentaries of AL. New York, NY: Samuel Weiser. pp. ix-xi. ISBN 0-87728-287-0.
- Instructions for Aleister Crowley's Thoth Tarot Deck. New York, NY: Samuel Weiser. 1978. ISBN 0-87728-444-X.
- “An Introduction to the History of the O.T.O.” in Crowley, Aleister (1986). The Equinox III, Vol. 3, No. 10. Samuel Weiser. p. 87. ISBN 0-87728-719-8.
- The Templars and the Assassins: The Militia of Heaven. Destiny Books, 2001. ISBN 978-0-89281-859-4
- The Slaves Shall Serve: Meditations on Liberty. Sekmet Books. 2004.
- The Mystery Traditions: Secret Symbols & Sacred Art (a revised and expanded edition of Art & Symbols of the Occult, 1993). Destiny Books, 2005. ISBN 978-1-59477-088-3
- An Illustrated History of the Knights Templar. Destiny Books, 2006. ISBN 978-1-59477-117-0
- The Secrets of Masonic Washington: A Guidebook to Signs, Symbols, and Ceremonies at the Origin of America’s Capital. Destiny Books, 2008. ISBN 978-1-59477-266-5
- Wasserman, James; Nancy Wasserman (2013). To Perfect This Feast: The Gnostic Mass (Revised third ed.). Sekmet Books. ISBN 978-0-9718870-3-9.
- The Temple of Solomon: From Ancient Israel to Secret Societies. Inner Traditions, 2011. ISBN 978-1-59477-220-7
- In the Center of the Fire: A Memoir of the Occult 1966-1989. Ibis Press, 2012. ISBN 978-0-89254-201-7
- The Book of Days: Perpetual Calendar. Intrinsic Books, 2014. ISBN 978-0-9718870-8-4
- Templar Heresy: A Story of Gnostic Illumination. (with Keith W. Stump and Harvey Rochman) Destiny Books, 2017. ISBN 978-1-62055-658-0

=== As editor ===
- Crowley, Aleister (2006). Aleister Crowley and the Practice of the Magical Diary. Redwheel/Weiser. ISBN 978-1-57863-372-2. (originally published in 1993 by New Falcon Publications, new edition fully revised and expanded. With Frater Achad and J. Daniel Gunther)
- Birch, Una (2007). Secret Societies: Illuminati, Freemasons, and the French Revolution. Nicolas Hays. ISBN 978-0-89254-132-4.
- Regardie, Israel (2009). Healing Energy, Prayer, and Relaxation. New Falcon Publications. ISBN 978-1-56184-183-7. (with Colin Wilson, Christopher S. Hyatt, and Lon Milo Duquette)
- Stanley, Thomas (2010). Pythagoras: His Life and Teaching. Ibis Press. ISBN 978-0-89254-160-7.(with co-editor Daniel Gunther)
- The Weiser Concise Guide Series (5 titles) published by Redwheel/Weiser from 2006 to 2009
- Crowley, Aleister (2014). AHA! The Sevenfold Mystery of the Ineffable Love. New Falcon Publications. ISBN 978-1-56184-533-0. (Originally published in 1996, new edition fully revised and expanded. With J. Daniel Gunther, Frater Achad, and Israel Regardie.)

=== As publisher ===
- Simon, ed. (2008). The Necronomicon. Lake Worth, Florida: Ibis Press. ISBN 978-0-89254-146-1.
- Eva Von Dassow, ed. (2014). The Egyptian Book of the Dead: Twentieth Anniversary Edition. San Francisco: Chronicle Books. ISBN 978-1-4521-4438-2.
- Richard Kaczynski, ed. (2015). Success Is Your Proof: One Hundred Years of O.T.O. in North America. New York: Sekmet Books. ISBN 978-0-9863365-2-2.

== See also ==
- Members of Ordo Templi Orientis
