= The Blue Equinox =

Book by Aleister Crowley

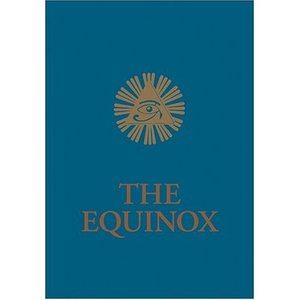
- Cover of The Blue Equinox displaying the Eye of Horus, an ancient Egyptian religious symbol adopted into Thelema
- Author: Aleister Crowley
- Language: English
- Series: The Equinox
- Release number: III (1)
- Subject: Thelema
- Publisher: Ordo Templi Orientis
- Publication date: 1919
- Publication place: United Kingdom
- Media type: Print
- ISBN: 1-57863-353-2
- Preceded by: The Equinox, I (10)
- Followed by: The Gospel According to St. Bernard Shaw

The Blue Equinox, officially known as The Equinox (Volume III, Number 1) is a book written by the English occultist Aleister Crowley, the founder of Thelema. First published in 1919, it details the principles and aims of the secret society O.T.O. and its ally the A∴A∴, both of which were under Crowley's control at the time. It includes such topics as The Law of Liberty, The Gnostic Mass, and Crowley's "Hymn to Pan".

== Background ==
In February 1904, Aleister Crowley and his wife Rose arrived in Cairo. Pretending to be a prince and princess, they rented an apartment in which Crowley set up a temple room and began invoking ancient Egyptian deities, while studying Islamic mysticism and Arabic. According to Crowley's later account, Rose regularly became delirious and informed him "they are waiting for you." On 18 March, she explained that "they" were the god Horus, and on 20 March proclaimed that "the Equinox of the Gods has come". She led him to a nearby museum, where she showed him a seventh-century BCE mortuary stele known as the Stele of Ankh-ef-en-Khonsu; Crowley thought it important that the exhibit's number was 666, the Number of the Beast in Christian belief, and in later years termed the artefact the "Stele of Revealing."

According to Crowley's later statements, on 8 April he heard a disembodied voice identifying itself as that of Aiwass, the messenger of Horus, or Hoor-Paar-Kraat. Crowley said that he wrote down everything the voice told him over the course of the next three days, and titled it Liber AL vel Legis or The Book of the Law. The book proclaimed that humanity was entering a new Aeon, and that Crowley would serve as its prophet. It stated that a supreme moral law was to be introduced in this Aeon, "Do what thou wilt shall be the whole of the Law," and that people should learn to live in tune with their Will. This book, and the philosophy that it espoused, became the cornerstone of Crowley's religion, Thelema.

In 1909, Crowley initiated publication of an irregular journal of Thelema, The Equinox. It served as the "official organ of the A∴A∴", his teaching order, and of Ordo Templi Orientis, his social order. It mainly featured articles about occultism and magick, while several issues also contained poetry, fiction, plays, artwork, and biographies. The Blue Equinox is the first issue of the third volume of the journal.

== Synopsis ==
The Blue Equinox opens with Crowley's poem "Hymn to Pan", a devotional work devoted to the ancient Greek deity Pan. This is followed by an editorial, in which Crowley discusses Thelema, his spiritual training order A∴A∴, his magical fraternity Ordo Templi Orientis, and the important role which he believed that they had to play in the Aeon of Horus.

1. Hymn to Pan
2. Editorial
3. Præmonstrance of A∴A∴
4. Curriculum of A∴A∴
5. Liber II [The Message of the Master Therion]
6. The Tent
7. Liber DCCCXXXVII [The Law of Liberty]
8. Liber LXI [vel Causae A∴A∴]
9. A Psalm
10. Liber LXV [Liber Cordis Cincti Serpente]
11. Liber CL [De Lege Libellum]
12. A Psalm
13. Liber CLXV [A Master of the Temple]
14. Liber CCC [Khabs am Pekht]
15. Stepping Out of the Old Aeon into the New
16. The Seven Fold Sacrament
17. Liber LII [Manifesto of the O.T.O.]
18. Liber CI [An Open Letter to Those Who May Wish to Join the Order]
19. Liber CLXI [Concerning the Law of Thelema]
20. Liber CXCIV [An Intimation with Reference to the Constitution of the Order]
21. Liber XV (The Gnostic Mass)
22. Nekam Adonai!
23. A La Loge
24. The Tank
- Special Supplement: Liber LXXI [The Voice of the Silence: The Two Paths, The Seven Portals]

== Editions ==
- Crowley, Aleister (Spring 1919). "The Blue Equinox". The Equinox. III (1). Detroit: Universal Publishing Co.
- Crowley, Aleister (1992). The Equinox (hbk.). Vol. III (1). York Beach, Maine: Red Wheel/Weiser. ISBN 978-0-87728-210-5.
- Crowley, Aleister (2005). The Equinox (pbk.). Vol. III (1). York Beach, Maine: Red Wheel/Weiser. ISBN 978-1-57863-353-1.
