= Helen Parsons Smith =

American occultist and entrepreneur (1910–2003)

- Title: Priestess

Personal life
- Born: Mary Helen Cowley; 1910 Chicago, Illinois, US
- Died: July 27, 2003 (aged 93) Truckee, California, US
- Spouse: Jack Parsons (m. 1935; div. 1946); Wilfred T. Smith (m. 1946; died 1957)
- Children: 1
- Other names: Helen Parsons, Helen Smith
- Occupation: Priestess, editor, publisher, entrepreneur

Religious life
- Religion: Thelema
- Denomination: Ecclesia Gnostica Catholica
- Temple: Agape Lodge; Church of Thelema
- Order: Ordo Templi Orientis
- Monastic name: Soror Grimaud

Helen Parsons Smith (born Mary Helen Cowley, and growing up as Helen Northrup, 1910 – July 27, 2003) was an American occultist, entrepreneur, book editor, and publisher. She served as Priestess of Ecclesia Gnostica Catholica at Agape Lodge of Ordo Templi Orientis in Pasadena, California, during the 1940s, and the independent Church of Thelema in Malibu during the 1950s, which her second husband Wilfred Talbot Smith led.

Parsons Smith was the sister of Scientology founder L. Ron Hubbard's wife Sara Northrup Hollister, and was the first wife of Jack Parsons, a prominent figure in both rocket engineering and occultism. She married Parsons in 1935. She participated in his interest in the occult, particularly in the teachings of Aleister Crowley's Thelema movement. Alongside Parsons, she engaged in various rituals and practices associated with Thelema, acting as Priestess in The Gnostic Mass.

During the 1970s, Parsons Smith played a role in the dissemination of Thelemic teachings and practices within the Ordo Templi Orientis (O.T.O.) community. She became involved in the editorial process of The Equinox, a serial publication associated with O.T.O. She ran a small company for publishing books, Thelema Publications.

== Biography ==
=== Early life ===
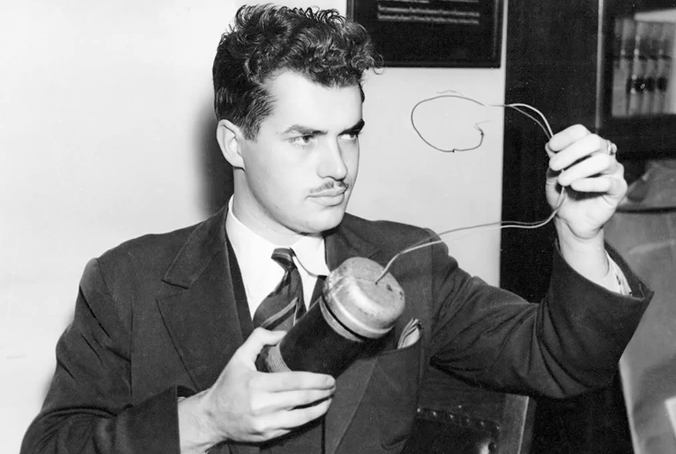
Jack Parsons in 1938

Mary Helen Northrup was born in Chicago, Illinois, the daughter of Burton Northrup and his wife, Olga Nelson, the daughter of a Swedish immigrant to the United States.

In 1923, the family moved to southern California, a destination Helen later said to have been chosen by Olga using a Ouija board. She worked for her father's firm, Northrup Business Adjustments, during the 1930s. In 1933, she met Jack Parsons, a chemist who became an expert in rocket propulsion, at a dance social at a Pasadena Congregationalist church. Helen and Jack were engaged in July 1934 and on April 26, 1935, they were married. They bought a house in Pasadena.

=== Life at Agape Lodge ===
Helen went away for a period in June 1941, during which Jack, influenced by the permissive atmosphere of O.T.O., initiated a relationship with Helen's 17-year-old sister, Sara Northrup. Upon Helen's return, Sara boldly proclaimed herself to be Parsons' new wife. While Helen and Jack stayed officially married for a time, in practice they were separated as Jack lived with Sara. Helen sought solace in the company of Wilfred Talbot Smith, sparking a relationship that endured for the rest of his life, while Wilfred's previous partner Regina Kahl was sidelined.

=== Later life ===
Helen married Smith on December 30, 1954, before a judge in Santa Monica and they moved to Malibu, where they began their own Thelemic group called "The Church of Thelema". They continued performing the Gnostic Mass together. Parsons Smith died on July 27, 2003, in the Tahoe Forest Hospital in Truckee, California.

== Editions published ==
- Crowley, Aleister (1971). Parsons Smith, Helen (ed.). "Shih Yi: A Critical and Mnemonic Paraphrase of the Yî King by Ko Yuen". The Equinox. III (7). Oceanside, California: Monthelema.
- Crowley, Aleister (1973). Parsons Smith, Helen (ed.). Khing Kang King: The Classic of Purity. Liber XXI. Kings Beach, California: Thelema Publications. ISBN 978-0-913576-07-6.
- Crowley, Aleister (1974). The Soul of the Desert. Kings Beach, California: Thelema Publications. ISBN 978-0-913576-08-3.
- Crowley, Aleister (1976). Parsons Smith, Helen (ed.). "The Tao Teh King, A New Translation". The Equinox. III (8). Kings Beach, California: Thelema Publications. ISBN 0-913576-06-9.
- Crowley, Aleister (1980) [1952]. Germer, Karl (ed.). The Vision and the Voice (Helen Parsons-Smith ed.). Barstow, California: Thelema Publishing Company. With an introduction by Israel Regardie. This was a second issue of Germer's 1952 edition.
- Crowley, Aleister (1991). "The Equinox of the Gods". The Equinox. III (3). Kings Beach, California: Thelema Publications.

== See also ==
- Aleister Crowley bibliography
- Babalon Working
- List of Thelemites
- Members of Ordo Templi Orientis

== Bibliography ==
- Carter, John (2004). Sex and Rockets: The Occult World of Jack Parsons. Port Townsend, Washington: Feral House. ISBN 978-0-922915-97-2.
- Kaczynski, Richard (2010). Perdurabo: The Life of Aleister Crowley (2nd ed.). Berkeley, California: North Atlantic Books. ISBN 978-0-312-25243-4.
- Kansa, Spencer (2011). Wormwood Star: The Magickal Life of Marjorie Cameron. Oxford: Mandrake of Oxford. ISBN 978-1-906958-08-4.
- Pendle, George (2006). Strange Angel: The Otherworldly Life of Rocket Scientist John Whiteside Parsons. Orlando, FL: Houghton Mifflin Harcourt. ISBN 978-0-15-603179-0.
- Rasmussen, Cecilia (March 19, 2000). "Life as Satanist Propelled Rocketeer". Los Angeles Times.
- Readdy, Keith (2018). One Truth, One Spirit: Aleister Crowley's Spiritual Legacy. New York: Weiser Books. ISBN 978-089254-184-3.
- Seckler, Phyllis (1978). "[untitled]". In the Continuum. II (2). Oroville, California: College of Thelema Publishing.
- Starr, Martin P. (2003). The Unknown God: W. T. Smith and the Thelemites. Bolingbrook, IL: Teitan Press. ISBN 978-0-933429-07-9.
- Weiser Antiquarian Books. "Aleister Crowley. Beastly Biographies and Other Used and Rare Books and Documents". Catalog #93.
- Wills, Matthew (May 8, 2023). "Sex-Cult Rocket Man". JSTOR Daily.
