= Ecclesia Gnostica Catholica =

Religious organization based on ideas and systems of early Christian and Jewish mysticism

Ecclesia Gnostica Catholica (E.G.C.), or the Gnostic Catholic Church, is a Gnostic church organization. It is the ecclesiastical arm of Ordo Templi Orientis (O.T.O.), an international fraternal initiatory organization devoted to promulgating the Law of Thelema. Thelema is a philosophical, mystical and religious system elaborated by Aleister Crowley, and based on The Book of the Law. The word Catholic denotes the universality of doctrine and not a Christian or Roman Catholic belief set.

The chief function of Ecclesia Gnostica Catholica is the public and private performance of the Gnostic Mass (Liber XV), a eucharistic ritual written by Crowley in 1913. According to William Bernard Crow, Crowley wrote the Gnostic Mass "under the influence of the Liturgy of St. Basil of the Russian Church". Its structure is also influenced by the initiatory rituals of Ordo Templi Orientis. Its most notable separation from similar rites of other churches is a Priestess officiating with a Priest, Deacon, and two Children. In addition to the Eucharist, baptism, confirmation, marriage, and last rites are offered by E.G.C. Marriage is not limited to couples of different genders.

About the Gnostic Mass, Crowley wrote in The Confessions of Aleister Crowley, "... the Ritual of the Gnostic Catholic Church ... I prepared for the use of O.T.O., the central ceremony of its public and private celebration, corresponding to the Mass of the Roman Catholic Church." It is the single most commonly performed ritual at O.T.O. bodies, with many locations celebrating the Mass monthly or more frequently. Most O.T.O. bodies make some or all of these celebrations open to interested members of the public, so the Mass is often an individual's first experience of O.T.O.

Ecclesia Gnostica Catholica has a hierarchical structure of clergy, assisting officers, and laity which parallels the degree structure of the O.T.O. initiatory system. Before 1997, the two systems were more loosely correlated, but since then there have been strict rules concerning minimum O.T.O. degrees required to serve in particular E.G.C. roles.

== Membership ==
Membership in Ecclesia Gnostica Catholica is similar to the Roman Catholic Church, with some important differences. As currently constituted, E.G.C. includes both clergy and laity. Clergy must be initiate members of O.T.O., while laity may affiliate to E.G.C. through baptism and confirmation without undertaking any of the degree initiations of the Order.

Novice clergy are initiate members who participate in the administration of E.G.C. sacraments, although they have not yet taken orders (i.e., been through a ceremony of ordination).

The first ordination in E.G.C. is that of the diaconate. Second Degree initiates of O.T.O. who have been confirmed in E.G.C. can be ordained as Deacons, whose principal duties are to assist the Priesthood.

The sacerdotal ordination admits members to the priesthood. Sacerdotal ordinands must hold at least the K.E.W. degree of O.T.O., a degree only available by invitation. The Priesthood is responsible for administering the sacraments through the Gnostic Mass and other ceremonies as authorized by their supervising Bishops.

The Priesthood is supervised and instructed by the Episcopate, or Bishops. Full initiation to the Seventh Degree of O.T.O. includes episcopal consecration in E.G.C. The Tenth Degree Supreme and Holy King serves as the Primate or chief Bishop for any country that O.T.O. has organized a Grand Lodge. The Frater (or Soror) Superior of O.T.O. is also the Patriarch (Matriarch) of the Church, with ultimate authority over the clergy.

== Rituals ==
The principal ritual of Ecclesia Gnostica Catholica is the Gnostic Mass, a Eucharistic ceremony written by Aleister Crowley in 1913. Theodor Reuss produced and authorized a German translation in 1918.

The text of the Gnostic Mass makes reference to ceremonies of baptism, confirmation, and marriage. Crowley left some notes towards a baptism ritual, and his "Liber CVI" was written for use in a last rites circumstance. The Bishops of the contemporary Church have developed rituals for all of these purposes, as well as infant benedictions, consecration of holy oil, funerals, and home administration of the Eucharist to the sick.

Although some Gnostic Masses are held privately for initiates only, there is nothing 'secret' about E.G.C. rituals as such, and they are commonly open to the public.

== Saints ==
The Gnostic Saints of Ecclesia Gnostica Catholica are a series of historical and mythological figures revered in the religion of Thelema. They are found in the fifth Collect of Liber XV, titled "The Saints".

1. Lao-tze
2. Siddhârtha
3. Krishna
4. Tahuti
5. Mosheh
6. Dionysus
7. Mohammed
8. To Mega Thêrion
9. Hermês
10. Pan
11. Priapus
12. Osiris
13. Melchizedek
14. Khem
15. Amoun
16. Mentu
17. Hêraclês
18. Orpheus
19. Odysseus
20. Vergilius
21. Catullus
22. Martialis
23. Rabelais
24. Swinburne
25. Apollonius Tyanaeus
26. Simon Magus
27. Manes
28. Pythagoras
29. Basilides
30. Valentinus
31. Bardesanes
32. Hippolytus
33. Merlin
34. Arthur
35. Kamuret
36. Parzival
37. Carolus Magnus
38. William of Schyren
39. Frederick of Hohenstaufen
40. Roger Bacon
41. Jacobus Burgundus Molensis the Martyr
42. Christian Rosencreutz
43. Ulrich von Hutten
44. Paracelsus
45. Michael Maier
46. Roderic Borgia, Pope Alexander the Sixth
47. Jacob Boehme
48. Francis Bacon, Lord Verulam
49. Andrea
50. Robertus de Fluctibus
51. Giordano Bruno
52. Johannes Dee
53. Sir Edward Kelly
54. Thomas Vaughan
55. Elias Ashmole
56. Molinos
57. Adam Weishaupt
58. Wolfgang von Goethe
59. William Blake
60. Ludovicus Rex Bavariae
61. Richard Wagner
62. Alphonse Louis Constant
63. Friedrich Nietzsche
64. Hargrave Jennings
65. Dr. Paschal Beverly Randolph
66. Carl Kellner
67. Forlong dux
68. Sir Richard Payne Knight
69. Sir Richard Francis Burton
70. Paul Gauguin
71. Harry Everett Smith
72. Docteur Gérard Encausse
73. Doctor Theodor Reuss
74. Sir Aleister Crowley
75. Karl Johannes Germer
76. Grady Louis McMurtry

Two Gnostic Saints have been officially added to the original list. William Blake was so recognized based on a discovered writing by Aleister Crowley which described him as such. Giordano Bruno was more recently added to the list.

== History ==
The Ecclesia Gnostica Catholica descended from a line of French Gnostic revival churches that developed in the 19th century. At that time, these Gnostic churches were essentially Christian in nature. In 1907, Gerard Encausse, Jean Bricaud and Louis-Sophrone Fugairon founded their own, simply called the Gnostic Catholic Church. In 1908, they conferred O.T.O. Grand Master Theodor Reuss with episcopal consecration and primatial authority within their GCC. Later that year, Reuss incorporated the Gnostic Catholic Church into O.T.O., after the original founders renamed their church the Universal Gnostic Church.

The name "Ecclesia Gnostica Catholica" was not applied to the church until Crowley wrote the Gnostic Mass in 1913, which Reuss proclaimed to be the church's official rite. This marked the first time an established church accepted the Law of Thelema as its central doctrine. Reuss then announced a new title for himself: the "Sovereign Patriarch and Primate of the Gnostic Catholic Church".

In 1979, Hymenaeus Alpha X° (Grady McMurtry) separated Ecclesia Gnostica Catholica from Ordo Templi Orientis, and made it into an independent organization, with himself at the head of both. During this period of separation Ecclesia Gnostica Catholica published its own quarterly magazine. However, in 1986, his successor, Hymenaeus Beta, dissolved the separate Gnostic Catholic Church corporation and folded the church back into O.T.O. Since then the Church has expanded greatly, and in recent years several books and articles dealing with the E.G.C. and the Gnostic Mass have been published by its Clergy, notably by Tau Apiryon and Tau Helena, James and Nancy Wasserman, Rodney Orpheus, and Cathryn Orchard.

== Gnostic Creed ==
The creed of Ecclesia Gnostica Catholica—also known as the Gnostic Creed—is recited in the Gnostic Mass, during the Ceremony of the Introit.

The text of the Creed is as follows:

I believe in one secret and ineffable LORD; and in one Star in the Company of Stars of whose fire we are created, and to which we shall return; and in one Father of Life, Mystery of Mystery, in His name CHAOS, the sole vicegerent of the Sun upon the Earth; and in one Air the nourisher of all that breathes.
And I believe in one Earth, the Mother of us all, and in one Womb wherein all men are begotten, and wherein they shall rest, Mystery of Mystery, in Her name BABALON.
And I believe in the Serpent and the Lion, Mystery of Mystery, in His name BAPHOMET.
And I believe in one Gnostic and Catholic Church of Light, Life, Love and Liberty, the Word of whose Law is THELEMA.
And I believe in the communion of Saints.
And, forasmuch as meat and drink are transmuted in us daily into spiritual substance, I believe in the Miracle of the Mass.
And I confess one Baptism of Wisdom whereby we accomplish the Miracle of Incarnation.
And I confess my life one, individual, and eternal that was, and is, and is to come.
AUMGN. AUMGN. AUMGN.

=== Explication ===
The first six articles profess several beliefs by the congregants. The remaining two are confessions. The Creed ends with the Thelemic form of the Pranava, equivalent to the sacred Vedic syllable "Aum" or to the "Amen" of the Judaeo-Christian tradition. On the basic form of the Creed, Tau Apiryon and Helena (1998) write:

The first 4 clauses are attributed to the four letters of Tetragrammaton YHVH: the Father (Chaos); the Mother (Babalon); the Union of Father and Mother in the Son (Baphomet); and the Daughter, the Bride of the Son (the Church). The two following clauses describe the essential products of the Mass from the perspective of the congregation. The final two clauses are in the form of confession rather than belief and describe parallels between the occurrences in the Mass and the life of the individual.

== List of clergy ==
Bishops

- William Breeze (b. 1955)

Priestesses

- Helen Parsons Smith (1910–2003)

== See also ==
- Gnosticism
- Magical organization
