= The Equinox of the Gods =

1936 book by Aleister Crowley

- Cover art of 1991 edition
- Author: Aleister Crowley
- Language: English
- Series: The Equinox
- Release number: III (3)
- Subject: Thelema
- Published: 1936
- Publisher: Ordo Templi Orientis
- Publication place: United Kingdom
- Preceded by: The Gospel According to St. Bernard Shaw
- Followed by: Eight Lectures on Yoga

The Equinox of the Gods is a book first published in 1936 detailing the events and circumstances leading up to Aleister Crowley's 1904 transcription of The Book of the Law, the central text of Thelema.

Included in The Equinox of the Gods are a facsimile of Crowley's handwritten manuscript of The Book of the Law, personal diary extracts, and a full color reproduction of the Stèle of Revealing.

== History of the 1955 Samuel Weiser edition ==
Karl Germer, successor to Aleister Crowley as head of Ordo Templi Orientis was a customer of Weiser Antiquarian Books. After Crowley's death, most of his papers and other possessions were shipped to Germer, including unbound sheets of the 1936 edition of his book The Equinox of the Gods. In 1955, Germer sold the sheets to Samuel Weiser, who had them bound up in maroon cloth and sold through the shop. This was probably one of the first books to be published by Samuel Weiser – although it retained the original O.T.O. title page and imprint.

== Editions ==
- Crowley, Aleister (1936). "The Equinox of the Gods". The Equinox. III (3). London: Ordo Templi Orientis.
- Crowley, Aleister (1955). "The Equinox of the Gods". The Equinox. III (3). York Beach, Maine: Samuel Weiser.
- Crowley, Aleister (1991). "The Equinox of the Gods". The Equinox. III (3). Kings Beach, California: Thelema Publications.
- Crowley, Aleister (1991). Beta, Hymenaeus (ed.). "The Equinox of the Gods". The Equinox. III (3). Scottsdale, Arizona: New Falcon Publications. ISBN 1-56184-028-9.
