= Eight Lectures on Yoga =

1939 book by Aleister Crowley

- Author: Aleister Crowley
- Language: English
- Series: The Equinox
- Release number: III (4)
- Subject: Thelema
- Publisher: Ordo Templi Orientis
- Publication date: 1939
- Publication place: United Kingdom
- ISBN: 0-9726583-1-9
- Preceded by: The Equinox of the Gods
- Followed by: The Book of Thoth

Eight Lectures on Yoga is a book by the English occultist Aleister Crowley about the practice of Yoga. The book is the fourth of volume 3 of The Equinox, which was published by Ordo Templi Orientis. The work is largely a demystified look at yoga, using little to no jargon. It is in two sections each with four parts, which are transcripts of eight one-hour lectures on the subject given by Crowley. The book was originally published in 1939.

== Summary ==
In Eight Lectures on Yoga, Crowley instructs students on the steps needed to approach mysticism through yoga, and details the complications that arise along the path. One intent Crowley had in writing the book was to dispel the various myths surrounding Yoga in Europe at the time — most thought it to be an exotic, Eastern ritual of the ancient past.

The first section, "Yoga for Yahoos", is in four lectures, in which Crowley successively:

1. Dissects the word "Yoga", as well as its various implications on the human mind.
2. Lists the eight limbs of Yoga, and explains the first, Yama, which is defined as control.
3. Details Niyama, the second limb of Yoga, with analogies to various planets.
4. Describes Asana and Pranayama, the third and fourth limbs of Yoga, and correct posture while practicing.

The second section, "Yoga for Yellowbellies", covers the remaining four limbs of Yoga (Pratyahara, Dharana, Dhyana, and Samadhi), in four lectures. Crowley gives an overview of what he calls the more "mental" aspect of yoga with the last four limbs, combining this with elements from his own esoteric writings, and recommendations for meditation practice.

== History ==
Aleister Crowley, an occultist, became interested in yoga during his travels in 1901 to Ceylon (modern Sri Lanka) and Madurai en route to visit his friend Allan Bennett / Ananda Maitreya Bhiksu (1872–1923), a fellow initiate of Crowley's in the Hermetic Order of the Golden Dawn. Crowley wrote in his Confessions about his attraction to Sri Sabhapati Swami's writings on the topic, and incorporated some of his philosophy into his 1912 work Magick (Book 4). The Eight Lectures on Yoga describe some of the concepts of the Yoga Sutras of Patañjali. Crowley published the book under the pseudonym "Mahatma Guru Sri Paramahansa Shivaji" (Revered Great-Souled Teacher, Supreme Swan, Lord Shiva).

== Analysis ==
The yoga scholar-practitioner Mark Singleton notes that Crowley's writings on yoga, of which he had a "fairly good grasp", helped to link yogis with practitioners of magic in Western minds This placed him among early proponents of yoga in the Western world (at a time when the practice of asanas was largely rejected), alongside Vivekananda, Krishnamurti, and Annie Besant.

== Editions ==
Eight Lectures on Yoga has been republished in 1991 and 1994 by New Falcon Publications.
