= George Raffalovich =

Journalist and novelist

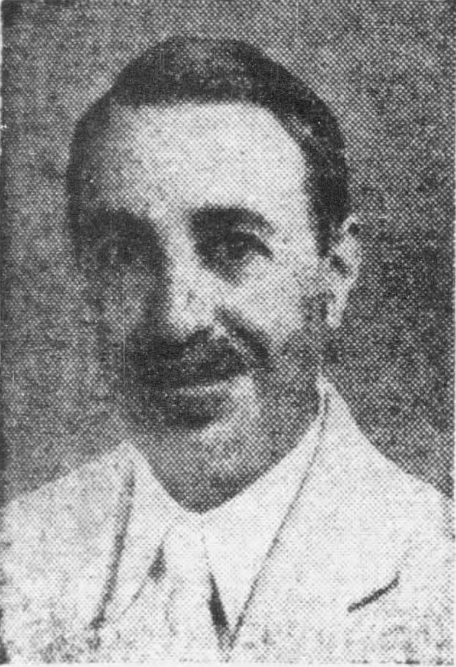
George Raffalovich in October 1940

George Raffalovich (10 December 1880 – 17 May 1958) was a journalist, novelist, and academic. He was born in France and moved to the UK in about 1906. He was associated with the occultist Aleister Crowley for several years before World War I. He became a supporter of Ukrainian independence, and published several articles on the topic, but left the UK for America when his support for Ukraine led to him being suspected of treasonous sympathies with the Central Powers. He became an academic in the US, lecturing at Dartmouth College and Emory University, eventually settling in New Orleans where he died in 1958.

== Early life ==
Raffalovich was born on 10 December 1880 in Cannes, France. He was raised as a Catholic and was French via his mother, Nadine Chaptal; according to one account, his mother was a countess, descended from one of Napoleon's ministers. (Note: The source for Raffalovich's mother having been a countess is Aleister Crowley, with whom Raffalovich was associated for a while.) His father was Gregor Raffalovich; (Note: According to another source his father's name may have been Artur Germanovich Rafalovich. This is dismissed by a more recent paper, which also gives Theodore and Gregoire as alternative forms of the name.) his ancestors on this side were Ukrainian Jews, but he considered it debatable whether he could call himself Jewish. His relatives included Sophie Raffalovich, his cousin, and her brother Marc-André Raffalovich. Gregor died in 1881, in Paris.

He studied at Nancy-Université and obtained a bachelor of arts degree. He inherited a good deal of money when he came of age, but spent extravagantly, buying a traveling circus at one point. His family put aside some money for him and eventually persuaded him to get control of his spending. He was drafted into the French army, and brought a lawsuit to try to escape the obligation.

== Dealings with Aleister Crowley ==
He moved to the UK in about 1906, and became a British citizen that year. He met Aleister Crowley, the English occultist, that year; (Note: Crowley's biographer implies that Crowley met Raffalovich after he had been in the country for some time, but according to Crowley's autobiography they had known each other for about three years by 1909.) Crowley lent him money while he was still recovering from his overspending. He spoke no English when he arrived in the UK, but learned it quickly enough to publish a collection of short stories, Planetary Journeys and Earthly Sketches, in 1908. Crowley remarked on his talent in his reminiscences: "His imperfect acquaintance with English resulted in his inventing curiously fascinating terms of phraseology. He had remarkable imagination and a brilliant ability to use the bizarre." The two books contained some fantasy and early science fiction stories; the former is described by The Oxford Companion to Edwardian Fiction as "mostly consist[ing] of affected parables", though Israel Zangwill was more complimentary about his work.

In 1909 Crowley began publishing The Equinox, a journal about his occult interests, and began enrolling students. Raffalovich was among the first to sign up, under the name Frater Audeo et Gaudeo. Raffalovich's fiction, some of which was published in The Equinox, included stories featuring a character named Elphenor Pistouillat de la Ratisboisière, who was based on Crowley. In 1910, via the publishing house he had set up for The Equinox, Crowley republished Planetary Journeys under the title On the Loose, and also published two other books of Raffalovich's: The Deuce and All, and The History of a Soul.

At one point he proposed to Crowley that they form a company to publish the journal, but by early 1910 there was a rift between the two and the acquaintanceship ended, with Crowley claiming that Raffalovich had acted on his behalf without authorization, and cashed cheques in Crowley's name, forging the signature.

== International politics ==
In 1910 Raffalovich began publishing articles on international politics. He met Vladimir Stepanowsky, a Ukrainian political exile, in London in 1912, and soon began publishing letters and articles in support of Ukrainian independence, sometimes under the pseudonym "Bedwin Sands". Along with Stepanowsky, Marian Melenevsky, and Francis Bartlett, he was one of the four founders of the London-based Ukraine Committee (also known as the Ukraine (British) Committee), in March 1913. He became the Honorary Secretary, and by the summer of that year was the main organizer of the committee's activities. Members included the historian Robert Seton-Watson.

Raffalovich was also among the leadership of Ottoman Committee founded in the summer of 1913, a society focused on relations with Turkey, and later renamed into the Ottoman Association.

Raffalovich is described in the Encyclopedia of Ukraine as "the best-informed observer of Ukrainian affairs in Great Britain in his day". In 1914 Raffalovich was invited to visit Lviv to participate in celebrations of the centenary of the birth of Taras Shevchenko. He spent several months, starting in May 1914, in Galicia, and was there when World War I broke out in August 1914, but was able to return to the UK. He was forced to leave the UK in 1915 under suspicion of treasonously supporting Germany, and the Ukraine Committee ceased to exist with his departure.

== Later life ==
In 1916 he was in New York, and corresponded with Joseph King, a British MP, about the state of the Ukrainians. King was fined for including information about war issues in a letter he sent to Raffalovich, and an article appeared in the London Evening Standard accusing Raffalovich of pro-German sympathies.

By 1921 Raffalovich was an assistant professor of French at Dartmouth College in Hanover, New Hampshire; Dartmouth granted him a leave of absence for the 1921-1922 academic year. He spent five years in the 1920s in Italy, returning by early 1928, and published a study of Mussolini. In 1926, while in Italy, he was Secretary-Interpreter for a program of the Rockefeller Foundation. He married and he and his wife, Dorothy Harmon Dawson, moved to Atlanta, Georgia in about 1929. She died there on April 2, 1940, aged 51. Later that year he began teaching French and Italian at the Georgia Conservatory of Music in Atlanta.

He died in New Orleans, Louisiana, on 17 May 1958.

== Works ==
This is a partial list of Raffalovich's work as a writer and translator.

=== Books ===
- Hrushevskyi, Mykhailo (1915). The Historical Evalulation of the Ukrainian Problem.Translated by George Raffalovich.
- Raffalovich, George (1908). Planetary Journeys and Earthly Sketches. London: Arnold Fairbairns and Company.
  - Retitled: Raffalovich, George (1910). On the Loose. London: Publishing Office of the Equinox.
- Raffalovich, George (1910). The Deuce and All. London: Publishing Office of the Equinox.
- Raffalovich, George (1910). The History of a Soul. London: The Equinox.
  - Reprinted: Raffalovich, George (1911). The History of a Soul. London: Crown.
- Raffalovich, George (1912). Hearts Adrift. London: Crown.
- Raffalovich, George (1923). Benito Mussolini: A Preliminary Sketch. Firenze, Italy: The Owl.
- Vandérem, Fernand (1919). Two Banks of the Seine. New York: E. P. Duttopn & Company. Translated by George Raffalovich.

=== Short stories ===
- Raffalovich, George (July 1908). "Nadia". The Idler. 33 (70): 399–402.

=== Pamphlets ===
- Sands, Bedwin (1914). The Ukraine (2nd impression ed.). London: Francis Griffiths.
- Raffalovich, George (1916). The Russians in Galicia. New York City: Ukrainian National Council.

== Sources ==
- "Books Received", The Academy, no. 2016, pp. 630–631, 24 December 1910
- Seed, William H. (29 May 1914). "Turcophil Societies in London". The Near East. VII (160): 108.
- "Notes and News", The Academy, no. 2196, pp. 728–729, 6 June 1914
- "Duce Biographer to Speak Monday on Emory Campus", The Atlanta Constitution, p. 4, November 3, 1929
- "Mrs. Raffalovich Dies in 52nd Year", The Atlanta Constitution, p. 12, 3 April 1940
- "Untitled", The Atlanta Journal, p. 19, 8 October 1940
- Crowley, Aleister (1989). Symonds, John; Grant, Kenneth (eds.). The Confessions of Aleister Crowley (Abridged ed.). London: Penguin Books. ISBN 0-14-019189-5.
- "Extract from Minutes of Trustees' Meeting", Dartmouth Alumni Magazine, pp. 108–110, December 1921
- Dobriansky, Mykhailo (October 1963). "У відповідь на питання: «Хто такий Бедвін Сендс?»" [In response to the question, "Who is Bedwin Sands?"]. Suchasnist (in Ukrainian) (34): 124–126.
- Kaczynski, Richard (2010). Perdurabo. Berkeley, California: North Atlantic Books. ISBN 978-1-58394-576-6.
- Kravchenyuk, Osyp (September 1963). "Ще раз «Українське питання в Англії 50 років тому»" [More about the "Ukrainian question in England 50 years ago"]. Suchasnist (in Ukrainian) (33): 113–117.
- Maxwell, Alexander (2013–2014). "Ukrainian frontiers in Austro-Hungarian and American Popular Cartography, 1917-1918". New Zealand Slavonic Journal. 47/48: 125–153.
- "Raffalovich, George: Record of order of admission". National Archives. November 25, 1927.
- "Dr. Raffalovich Dead". The New York Times. 22 May 1958. p. 29.
- Raffalovich, George (21 March 1928). "Mussolini and the Pope". The Outlook. 148 (12): 453.
- Rakhmannyi, Roman (March 1963). "Українське питання в Англії 50 років тому" [The Ukrainian question in England 50 years ago]. Suchasnist (in Ukrainian) (27): 117–120.
- Salah, Asher (November 2015). "From Odessa to Florence: Elena Comparetti Raffalovich. A Jewish Russian Woman in Nineteenth-Century Italy". Quest: Issues in Contemporary Jewish History (8): 125–153. doi:10.48248/issn.2037-741X/742.
- David, Saunders (1983). "Aliens in Britain and the Empire During the First World War". Loyalties in Conflict: Ukrainians in Canada During the Great War. Edmonton, Alberta: Canadian Institute of Ukrainian Studies. pp. 99–124. ISBN 0-920862-22-5.
- Saunders, David (January 1988), "Britain and the Ukrainian Question (1912-1920)", The English Historical Review, 103 (406): 40–68, doi:10.1093/ehr/CIII.CCCCVI.40, JSTOR 571561
- Swyripa, Frances (1983). "The Ukrainian Image: Loyal Citizen or Disloyal Alien". Loyalties in Conflict: Ukrainians in Canada During the Great War. Edmonton, Alberta: Canadian Institute of Ukrainian Studies. pp. 47–68. ISBN 0-920862-22-5.
