= Marcelo Ramos Motta =

Brazilian writer

- Born: June 27, 1931; Rio de Janeiro, Brazil
- Died: August 26, 1987 (aged 56); Teresópolis, Brazil
- Other names: Parzival X° Parzival XI°
- Occupations: Writer, translator, teacher
- Writing career
- Genre: Occult
- Subjects: Thelema, Aleister Crowley
- Notable works: Calling the Children of the Sun

Marcelo Ramos Motta (June 27, 1931 – August 26, 1987) was a Brazilian writer, Thelemite, and member of the A∴A∴ occult society. Known for his work in the field of Thelema, he was a prominent figure in the Thelemic community and contributed significantly to its literature. Motta was also recognized by his magical names Parzival X° and Parzival XI°. His writings, which include translations of Aleister Crowley's works and original Thelemic texts, have had a lasting impact on the study and practice of Thelema in Brazil and beyond.

== Early life ==
Motta was born at the city of Rio de Janeiro (Brazil). Very little is known about his childhood, only that he was born into a family with Swiss-German ancestry and received a very strict education, amplified by his admission at the Military Academy of Rio de Janeiro (Colégio Militar do Rio de Janeiro). His father was a follower of the doctrine of Allan Kardec (a reincarnationist and spiritualist doctrine established in France in the mid-19th century) and his mother was Catholic. At eleven years of age he became interested for the first time in the mysterious "Rosicrucians", after reading Zanoni, the novel by Sir Edward Bulwer-Lytton. He also read works by Papus, Blavatsky, Patanjali, Paracelsus and Arnold Krumm-Heller. He "decided to search for them and to become one of those mysterious Adepts". But his first contact with a self-proclaimed Rosicrucian society, the Brazilian branch of AMORC, did not satisfy him and he started his search for an initiatory school of the sort he found in Arnold Krumm-Heller's novel Rose-Croix.

His time at the Military Academy of Rio de Janeiro gave him a sense of duty and discipline, which he applied to his occult research. During that time, he became interested in astrology and tarot, among other esoteric topics. Those interests were not very common among his fellow students, but they gave him some knowledge to argue with his philosophy teacher in a debate that became famous for years.

At the age of 17 he made contact with the Fraternitas Rosicruciana Antiqua, Arnold Krumm-Heller's Rosicrucian order, and took his first initiations in 1948. Local political tension impelled him to move to Europe and then to the United States of America. His mission on this voyage, given by the Brazilian leadership of the FRA, was to meet Parsival Krumm-Heller (son of Arnold Krumm-Heller and then legal leader of FRA) and mediate the contacts between the Brazilian group and the international leadership.

== Career ==
Motta's first contact with Thelema was through John Symonds' book biography of Aleister Crowley, The Great Beast. Motta saw many connections between the Law of Thelema and parts of his initiations at FRA, but he had never previously heard about Thelema or Aleister Crowley. Furthermore, the book gave him some serious doubts about Crowley's initiations. After asking P. Krumm-Heller about the subject, Motta received from him considerable material about Thelema and Crowley, readings that completely changed Motta's opinion about Crowley and his methods and philosophy. Later, in the US, P. Krumm-Heller introduced Motta to Karl Germer, leader of Ordo Templi Orientis at that time.

=== Society Ordo Templi Orientis ===
Returning to Brazil in 1962, Motta translated and published Crowley's Liber Aleph and wrote Calling the Children of the Sun, the first Thelemic writing published in Brazil (later this work was suppressed by Motta himself for fear of political repercussions). From this year to 1987, Motta, as a member of A∴A∴ had numerous students under his tutelage. Karl Germer died in 1962, and in 1969, Grady McMurtry assumed control of O.T.O. based on his letters of "emergency authorization" given to him by Crowley.

Motta established his own O.T.O. called Society Ordo Templi Orientis in Brazil and elsewhere. Motta's pupils included the Brazilian celebrity novelist Paulo Coelho.

In 1975, Motta published "The Commentaries of AL", as The Equinox, Volume V, Number 1. This book was published by Samuel Weiser, Inc., and contained commentaries on The Book of The Law written by Aleister Crowley and by Motta himself. He also used this book to announce his claim to be the Outer Head of the Order (O.H.O.) of O.T.O. This claim was rejected by U.S. court in 1978, when Motta unsuccessfully sued for ownership of Crowley's copyrights. The case was finally rejected on appeal in 1985.

=== Death and successors ===
Motta died on August 26, 1987, in the city of Teresópolis (Brazil) at the age of 56 of a heart attack.

Daniel Ben Stone advertised S.O.T.O. in the classified section of the Llewellyn New Times and issued a very limited printing of the Oriflamme VI, #6 in hardcover.

In 1991, Ray Eales (Frater 939) established H.O.O.R. (Holy Order of RaHoorKhuit), an outer Thelemic order, and has published various volumes by Motta under the imprint of H.O.O.R. Publications from Tampa, Florida.

Claudia Canuto de Menezes remained relatively silent outside of issuing a statement in 2000 appearing to endorse Ray Eales and H.O.O.R.

== Published works ==
=== In Portuguese ===
- Poesias (self, n/d 1951 e.v., Rio de Janeiro)
- Chamando Os Filhos Do Sol (self, Abril 1962 e.v., Rio de Janeiro)
- O Equinócio dos Deuses (Março 1976 e.v., Sociedade Ordo Templi Orientis no Brasil, Ribeirăo Preto) being the translation of Crowley's Magick (Book 4) Part IV
- Yoga e Magia (Setembro, 1976 e.v. & 1981 e.v., Sociedade Ordo Templi Orientis Internacional, Ribeirăo Preto) being the translation of Magick (Book 4) Part I
- Magia e Misticismo (Março 1982 e.v. & 1991 e.v., Sociedade Ordo Templi Orientis no Brasil, Ribeirăo Preto) being the translation of Magick (Book 4) (Part II)
- Ataque e Defesa Astral (Março, 1986 e.v., Sociedade Ordo Templi Orientis no Brasil, Ribeirăo Preto)
- Serviços de Inteligência năo săo Inteligentes (Setembro, 2000 e.v., The Headland Press, Old Greenwich)
- Carta a um Maçom (1980 e.v., Sociedade Ordo Templi Orientis no Brasil, Ribeirăo Preto)
- Dos Propósitos Políticos da Ordem (1987 e.v., Sociedade Ordo Templi Orientis no Brasil, Ribeirăo Preto)
- Moral e Cívica Telêmicas (1987 e.v., Sociedade Ordo Templi Orientis no Brasil, Ribeirăo Preto)

=== In English ===
The publications of Thelema Publishing Company and Troll Publishing Company emanated from Nashville, Tennessee.

==== Pamphlets ====
- Thelemic Political Morality (S.O.T.O., 1978 2nd pr 1980)
- Manifesto (S.O.T.O., 1980 [USA]; UK edition published by Society Ordo Templi Orientis of England, 1980 - designated '2nd ed')
- Of the Political Aims of the O.T.O. (S.O.T.O. 1980; expanded ed Dark Star Press [USA] 2005)
- Letter to a Brazilian Mason (Troll Publishing Co, 1980)
- Liber AL vel Legis — The Book of the Law (Troll Publishing Co, 1980 - hardcover; German ed by Aton Lodge Press, Bochum, 2013)
- Calling the Children of the Sun (S.O.T.O. 1983–84; reprint lulu.com, 2019)

==== The Equinox series ====
All volumes in this series were issued as hardcovers, however there was an unauthorised paperbound reprint of "The Commentaries of AL" published by Joseph J. Zver of Allentown PA in 1985. The major portion of Volume V, #2 was also printed in a limited edition, signed spiral-bound format with a custom index by Gregory von Seewald (March 1996 e.v., The Headland Press, Old Greenwich).

- The Equinox — Vol. V n. 1 — "The Commentaries of AL" (September 1975 e.v., Samuel Weiser, Inc., New York & 1976 e.v., Routledge & Kegan Paul, London and Henley, red cloth) Preface by James Wasserman. Includes Crowley's 'Old' and 'New' Commentaries on Liber AL, together with Motta's own commentaries.
- The Equinox — Vol. V n. 1 — "The Commentaries of AL" 2nd ed (September, 1990 e.v., Thelema Publishing Company, Canberra, purple cloth) Includes new editorial material by William Barden and expanded index as well as Crowley's 'Old' and 'New' Commentaries on Liber AL, together with Motta's own commentaries.
- The Equinox — Vol. V n. 2 - "Satan and Christ" (March 1979 e.v., Thelema Publishing Company, Nashville) This was the only volume of the series to feature not only a standard edition, but a deluxe edition limited to 200 copies signed by Motta. Though popularly known as 'LXV Commented', this volume includes various other texts by Crowley and others including Motta and Fernando Pessoa. Liber LXV is Crowley's "Liber Cordis Cincti Serpente" - "The Book of the Heart Girt With a Serpent".
- The Equinox — Vol. V n. 3 — "The Chinese Texts of Magick and Mysticism" (September 1980 e.v., Thelema Publishing Company, Nashville) Includes Crowley's versions of the Yi Jing; the Dau de Jing; and the Jing Gan Jing, with other texts by Crowley commented. Also includes work by comic book writer T. Casey Brennan and texts by others including Ray Eales.
- The Equinox — Vol. V n. 4 — "Sex and Religion" (March 1981 e.v., Thelema Publishing Company, Nashville) Includes Crowley's "Bagh-i-Muattar", "The Paris Working", "The Wake World", Crowley's 1906-07 diaries, and other texts, commented.

==== The Oriflamme series ====
All volumes in this series were issued as trade paperbacks only.

- Oriflamme - Vol. VI, n. 1 - "Yoga and Magick" (June 1982 e.v., Society Ordo Templi Orientis International, Nashville) Includes Book Four Part I with Motta's commentary, News, and Reviews.
- Oriflamme - Vol. VI, n. 1 - "Yoga and Magick" 2nd Ed. (December 1984 e.v., Society Ordo Templi Orientis International, Nashville) Includes a revised "O.T.O. News" section as well as Book Four Part I with Motta's commentary, and Reviews.
- Oriflamme - Vol. VI, n. 2 - "Magick and Mysticism" (December 1982 e.v., Society Ordo Templi Orientis International, Nashville) includes Book Four Part II with Motta's commentary, News, and Reviews.
- Oriflamme - Vol. VI, n. 3 - "Magick Without Tears Unexpurgated Commented— Part I" (December 1983 e.v., Society Ordo Templi Orientis International, Nashville) Includes the first half of Magick Without Tears with Motta's commentary, News, and Reviews.
- Oriflamme - Vol. VI, n. 3 - "Magick Without Tears Unexpurgated Commented— Part I" (December 2018 e.v., Society Ordo Templi Orientis in Australia, Canberra) Includes the first half of Magick Without Tears with Motta's commentary, News, and Reviews.
- Oriflamme - Vol. VI, n. 4 - "Magick Without Tears Unexpurgated Commented— Part II" (December 1984 e.v., Society Ordo Templi Orientis International, Nashville) Includes the second half of Magick Without Tears with Motta's commentary, News, and Reviews.
- Oriflamme - Vol. VI, n. 5 - "Thelemic Magick Unexpurgated Commented — Part I" (June 1987 e.v., Society Ordo Templi Orientis In Brasil, Rio de Janeiro) Includes Crowley's Magick (Book 4) Chapters 1–12 with Motta's commentary, News, and Reviews.
- Oriflamme - Vol. VI, n. 6 = "Thelemic Magick Unexpurgated Commented - Part II" (December 1991 e.v., Daniel Ben Stone, Washington, DC) Includes the remainder of Crowley's Magick (Book 4) with Motta's commentary.
- Oriflamme - Vol. VI, n. 6 - "Thelemic Magick Unexpurgated - Part II" (December 1991 e.v., Society Ordo Templi Orientis in Australia, Canberra) Includes the remainder of Crowley's Magick (Book 4).

==== HOOR Publications & Silver Star Publications ====
- The Equinox - Vol. VII, n. 1 - (March 1992 e.v., Silver Star Publication, Tampa) - Edited by Ray Eales & Vance Borland. Includes a collection of texts, a number of which were written by Aleister Crowley, others by Motta and also many other pieces by members of S.O.T.O..
- Two Essays (1996 e.v., HOOR Publications, Tampa) - Includes Motta's "Letter to a Brazilian Mason" and "Thelema, Politics, Society and You, an Essay" by Eales.
- Astral Attack and Defense (2006 e.v., HOOR Publications, Brasil) - Translated by Monica D. Rocha with commentaries by Ray Eales.
- Thelemic Political Morality and other Essays (2007 e.v., HOOR Publications, Tampa, FL) - Includes Motta's essays commented by Ray Eales and Monica D. Rocha.

==== Independent ====
- Letter to a Brazilian Mason [bilingual Portuguese and English edition] (2005 e.v. Dark Star Press, Highland Park, NJ) Biographical Note translated by Monica D. Rocha.
- Thelemic Society [bilingual Portuguese and English edition] (2005 e.v. Dark Star Press, Highland Park, NJ) Includes "Thelemic Political Morality" and "Of the Political Aims of the O.T.O.".
- Tracts on Aquarian Masonry (2005 e.v. Thelema Media Group, Highland Park, NJ) Includes "Thelemic Political Morality", "Letter to a Brasilian Mason", "Of the Political Aims of the O.T.O.", and "Manifesto" as well as Monica D. Rocha's translated biographical note to "Letter" as well as an introduction and index created by Dominick Bruno.
- A Literary Selection from the Works of Marcelo Ramos Motta (lulu.com, 2017). Contains poetry from Marcelo Ramos Motta's "Poesias", first published in Brasil in 1951 e.v. It is here translated from Portuguese into English for the first time. The volume also contains two screenplays and a novelet written under the pen name 'Mark Hellington'. Both screenplays were produced by the Canadian Broadcasting Corporation in the late 1950s e.v, and his sci-fi novelet, "The Silver Cube", first appeared in Future Science Fiction in 1958 e.v.
