= Weiser Antiquarian Books =

American bookstore

Coordinates: 43.1944°N 70.6168°W

Weiser Antiquarian Books is the oldest occult bookstore in the United States. It specialises in books on Aleister Crowley and his circle, magic, mysticism, eastern religions and alternative spirituality. Its earlier New York incarnation, The Weiser Bookshop, was described by Leslie A. Shepherd as "perhaps the most famous occult bookstore in the U.S."

== Early years ==
The original Samuel Weiser Bookstore was started in New York City's famous "Book Row" area by Samuel Weiser in 1926. It moved several times within the "Book Row" before relocating to 117 4th Avenue, where it remained for a number of decades. To start with, Samuel Weiser Books sold general used books but placed special emphasis on the occult and comparative religion. In 1949, Samuel Weiser was joined by his brother Ben who had worked with him for a few years in the 1930s. Throughout the 1950s and 1960s, they increased Weiser Books' specialist focus on the occult at a time when many bookstores refused to handle such subjects.

One of the customers of the shop was Karl Germer, successor to Aleister Crowley as head of Ordo Templi Orientis. After Crowley's death, most of his papers and other possessions were shipped to Germer, including the unbound sheets of the 1936 edition of his book The Equinox of the Gods. In 1955, Germer sold the sheets to Samuel Weiser, who had them bound up in maroon cloth and sold through the shop. This was probably one of the first books to be published by Samuel Weiser – although it retained the original O.T.O. title page and imprint. (Note: Details of the printing history of the Germer / Weiser issue of The Equinox of the Gods are given in Weiser Antiquarian Books (17 November 2006). "Catalog # 10. Aleister Crowley: Books, Ephemera & A Drawing". Weiser Antiquarian Books. Archived from the original on 5 January 2009.) Germer also sold Weiser a collection of the First Edition of Crowley's masterwork on the tarot, The Book of Thoth. Despite being leather bound, printed on handmade paper, and in an edition of only 200 copies signed by Crowley himself, interest in "the Beast" was low at the time and – for nearly two decades – copies could be purchased from the shop for $50 or less. (As of 2009, they command thousands of dollars.)

Rising rents and urban change forced many of the bookstores out of "Book Row." A number moved into the adjacent Broadway, with Weiser, whose stock had now grown to over a hundred thousand volumes, taking a premises at 845 Broadway. The new building had a huge basement, which the Weiser brothers crammed with books on all manner of subjects. After a heart attack forced Samuel Weiser into semi-retirement, Ben Weiser was joined by Samuel's son Donald.

== The 1960s onwards ==
Samuel Weiser had begun publishing in the mid-1950s, and through the late 1950s produced a small number of books under the Occult Research Press imprint before starting to publish under his own name. The development of the 1960s "counter-culture," and the growth of popular interest in esotericism and Eastern religious and mystical traditions, allowed Ben and Donald Weiser to expand the company's publishing activities. They recruited many contemporary authors, such as Israel Regardie, who were customers. The shop's stock also provided them with rare and out-of-print books that they could reprint.

The late 1960s saw the bookstore go through another move, this time into two floors at 734 Broadway, not far from Astor Place. The move gave Donald Weiser, who now ran the business with the assistance of Fred Mendel, the chance to further increase their specialisation. In addition to used and rare books on the occult, Weiser Books – or "The Weiser Bookstore," as it was then known – also stocked new domestic and imported titles. The publishing side of the business was also expanded, and moved into its own premises at 625 Broadway.

By the early 1980s, the costs of maintaining a number of businesses in New York City had grown increasingly difficult to sustain, and Donald Weiser moved Samuel Weiser Publishing and the new book distribution wing of the company to York, Maine.

In 1985, he also moved the specialist rare books section of the company – now named “Weiser Antiquarian Books” – to York, where it shared a two-storey warehouse with the publishing company's distribution centre. Much to the dismay of its many New York city customers, soaring city rents brought about the closure of the Broadway store in the early 1990s. Its huge stock of books was packed into shipping containers and moved to the new location in Maine, to be added to the stock of Weiser Antiquarian Books.

In the year 2000, Donald Weiser sold the publishing division of the company. Its new owners renamed it Red Wheel / Weiser but kept its York premises until 2006, when they moved the publishing company's editorial department to San Francisco and its marketing department to Newburyport, Massachusetts.

In 2005, Donald Weiser retired, and Weiser Antiquarian Books was purchased by its then-director Marilyn Rinn, and Australian writer and bookseller, Keith Richmond. The following year, they moved the company to its current premises in Cape Neddick, Maine: a one-time art gallery for American artist Walt Kuhn, which had more recently been the headquarters of Samuel Weiser Publishing. In 2007, they also began publishing under the Teitan Press imprint, which was founded by Martin P. Starr and Frank Winston.

== Catalogs ==
For decades, the Weiser Bookstore issued printed catalogs that listed anywhere between a few hundred and several thousand items, with basic descriptions of the book's author, title, condition and price. The advent of the internet brought an end to these printed catalogs, and for some years, Weiser Antiquarian Books only listed its books on various internet book-sites and directly on its own website.

In January 2006, Weiser Antiquarian Books began issuing a new series of online catalogs. Most of these catalogs are devoted to a specific author or theme. A large number have been devoted to the works of Aleister Crowley (in whom the store specialises), as well as authors including Dion Fortune, Israel Regardie, John Dee and Austin Osman Spare. In a number of cases – such as their catalogs on Jack Parsons, Marcelo Ramos Motta and Kenneth Grant – these are the first bookseller catalogs devoted specifically to these authors. Other catalogs have been devoted to specific journals – notably The Occult Review, The Inner Light, and Ambix – and subjects such as alchemy, spiritualism, Hermetica, Hermetic Qabalah, magick, The Hermetic Order of the Golden Dawn and Rosicrucianism. Others have been devoted to books from specific collections: for example, those of Helen Parsons Smith, Ray Burlingame, Edward Noel FitzGerald and Jean Michaud, or to collections of documents such as the Karl Germer / Reea Leffingwell correspondence or the C. F. Russell / Sydney Hamilton French / G∴B∴G∴ archive.

The catalogs contain bibliographical, historical and biographical information about the books offered for sale, and often detail previously unpublished manuscript and other material. They are often cited by researchers in online and printed publications. (Note: A number of Weiser Antiquarian listings have, for example, been adapted (with permission) by bibliographer Alan Pritchard for use in his online bibliography of Alchemy: Pritchard, Alan (27 May 2007). "Using the Bibliography". Alchemy: a bibliography of English-language writings.) At the request of customers and researchers, the older catalogs are now kept in an online archive.

Weiser Antiquarian Books is now primarily an internet retailer, and does not maintain an open shop, but is open to established customers by prior appointment.
