= The Book of Wisdom or Folly =

Book by Aleister Crowley

- Author: Aleister Crowley
- Language: English
- Series: The Equinox
- Release number: III (6)
- Subject: Thelema
- Publisher: Thelema Publishing Company
- Publication date: 1962
- Publication place: United Kingdom
- Preceded by: The Book of Thoth
- Followed by: Shih Yi

Liber Aleph vel CXI: The Book of Wisdom or Folly is the title of The Equinox, volume III, number VI, by Aleister Crowley. The book is written in the form of an epistle to his magical son, Charles Stansfeld Jones, Frater Achad, whom Crowley later doubted as being his true magical son, asserting that Achad had in fact gone insane, citing as evidence Achad's "upending the tree of life" in his Q.B.L., or The Bride's Reception, the first of Achad's major qabalistic works.

The book consists of 208 short epistles on the philosophy of Thelema, Crowley's own ethical system of occult magic. Though the book was not published until some time after its writing in 1918, it is considered one of the forefront commentaries on Crowley's teachings. The arcane style was probably either inspired by the short epistolary style of Heinrich Agrippa's De Occulta Philosophia or the introduction to The Book of the Sacred Magic of Abramelin the Mage which sees the author, Abraham the Jew, bequeathing the book to his son Lameck in the same hereditary spirit that this book claims. Even the titles of each epistle are given in Latin, and its often medieval guise of dealing with subject matters, such as the effects of "melancholy bile", can be considered another of Crowley's great examples of using ancient texts as templates.

The concept of the book is based on a passage from The Book of the Law (Liber AL vel Legis), the central text of Thelema, and states what appears to be a prophecy of later knowledge and secrets of the new Aeon of Horus being taught to a "magical son". At first Crowley thought this was a reference to a child he was to bear with his wife Rose Kelly, though after the death of their first-born (who had turned out to be a daughter) Crowley took the passage in its metaphorical sense of a young student who would inherit his teachings. Up to 1919, Crowley believed that Frater Achad was this Magical Child.

The number 111 given to the title refers to the numerical value of the Hebrew letter Aleph spelt in full which in Hermetic teachings corresponds to the first Tarot trump The Fool. The 111, added to Crowley's own number 666, produced the number of this magical son, 777.

== Editions ==
- Crowley, Aleister (1991). Liber Aleph vel CXI: The Book of Wisdom or Folly. York Beach, ME: Weiser. ISBN 978-0877287292.

== See also ==
- Aleister Crowley bibliography
