= The Equinox =

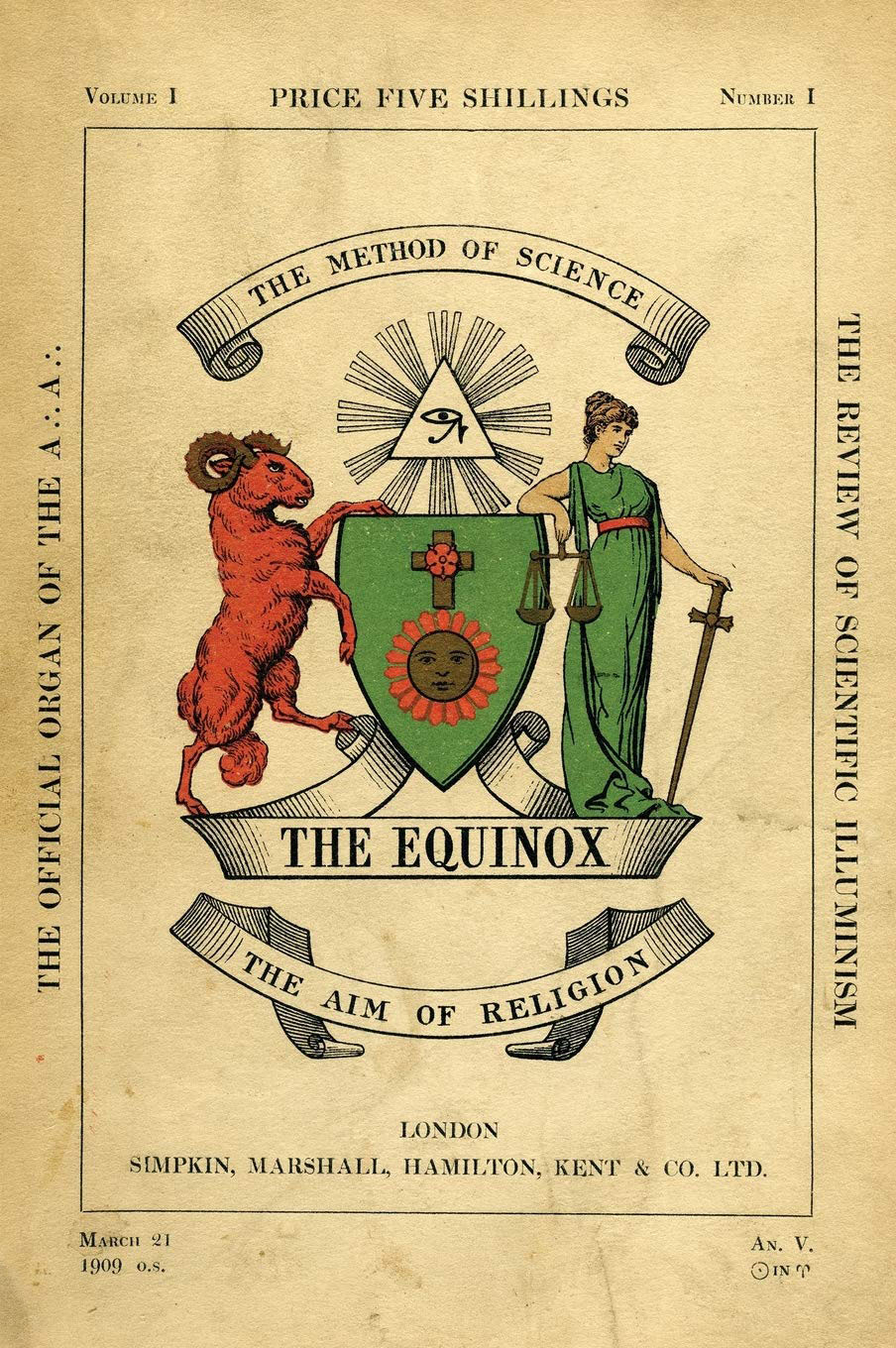
- Volume 1, Issue 1 (March 1909)
- Discipline: Thelema, magick
- Language: English
- Edited by: A∴A∴

Publication details
- History: 1909–1998
- Publisher: Simpkin, Marshall, Hamilton, Kent & Co. (United Kingdom)
- Frequency: Irregular

The Equinox (subtitle: The Review of Scientific Illuminism) is a periodical that serves as the official organ of the A∴A∴, a magical order founded by Aleister Crowley (although material is often of import to its sister organization, Ordo Templi Orientis). Begun in 1909, it mainly features articles about occultism and magick, while several issues also contained poetry, fiction, plays, artwork, and biographies. The most recent issue was published in 1998.

== Publication history ==
The Equinox appeared semiannually from the years 1909 through 1913. Volume II was never published, and vol. III:1 was the last in the regular serialized publications. After that, editions of the Equinox were published irregularly by various organizations and are best known by their book titles. All issues after III:5 were edited and released after Crowley's death in 1947.

- Vol. I, #1: Spring 1909. Simpkin, Marshall, Hamilton, Kent & Co., Ltd.
- Vol. I, #2: Autumn 1909. Simpkin, Marshall, Hamilton, Kent & Co., Ltd.
- Vol. I, #3: Spring 1910. Simpkin, Marshall, Hamilton, Kent & Co., Ltd.
- Vol. I, #4: Autumn 1910. Privately published, London.
- Vol. I, #5: Spring 1911. Privately published, London.
- Vol. I, #6: Autumn 1911. Wieland & Co.
- Vol. I, #7: Spring 1912. Wieland & Co.
- Vol. I, #8: Autumn 1912. Wieland & Co.
- Vol. I, #9: Spring 1913. Wieland & Co.
- Vol. I, #10: Autumn 1913. Wieland & Co.
- Vol. II: not issued
- Vol. III, #1: Spring 1919. Universal Publishing Co, Detroit MI
- Vol. III, #2: Jesus, Liber 888, and Other Papers—not issued
- Vol. III, #3: The Equinox of the Gods. 1936. London, O.T.O.
- Vol. III, #4: Eight Lectures on Yoga. 1939. London, O.T.O.
- Vol. III, #5: The Book of Thoth. 1944. London, O.T.O.
- Vol. III, #6: Liber Aleph. 1961. West Point, California, Thelema Publishing Company
- Vol. III, #7: Shih Yi. 1971. Kings Beach, California, Thelema Publications
- Vol. III, #8: The Tao Teh King. 1975. Kings Beach, California, Thelema Publications
- Vol. III, #9: The Holy Books of Thelema. 1983. Weiser.
- Vol. III, #10: 1986. Weiser.
- Vol. IV, #1: Commentaries on the Holy Books and Other Papers. 1996. Weiser.
- Vol. IV, #2: The Vision and the Voice with Commentary and Other Papers. 1998. Weiser.

== Contents of The Equinox ==
=== Volume I ===
==== Number 1 ====
1. Editorial
2. An Account of A∴ A∴
3. Liber Librae [The Book of the Balance]
4. Liber Exercitiorum
5. The Wizard Way. By Aleister Crowley
6. The Magic Glasses. By Frank Harris
7. The Chymical Jousting of Brother Perardua
8. The Lonely Bride. By Victor B. Neuburg
9. At the Fork of the Roads
10. The Magician
11. The Soldier and the Hunchback: ! And ? By Aleister Crowley
12. The Hermit
13. The Temple of Solomon the King (Book I)
14. The Herb Dangerous (Part I) : A Pharmaceutical Study. By E. Whineray, M.P.S.
15. Endpages
- Special Supplement: John St. John: the Record of the Magical Retirement of G. H. by Frater O∴ M∴

==== Number 2 ====
1. Frontpages
2. Editorial
3. Liber O [vel Manus et Sagittae sub Figura VI]
4. The Herb Dangerous (Part II) : The Psychology of Hashish. By Oliver Haddo
5. Reviews
6. The Garden of Janus. By Aleister Crowley
7. The Dream Circean. By Marital Nay
8. The Lost Shepherd. By Victor B. Neuburg
9. A Handbook of Geomancy
10. The Organ in King's Chapel, Cambridge, By G. H. S. Pinsent
11. A Note on Genesis
12. The Five Adorations. By Dost Achiha Khan
13. Illusion D'amoureux. By Francis Bendick
14. The Opium-Smoker
15. Postcards to Probationers. By Aleister Crowley
16. The Wild Ass. By Alys Cusack
17. The Sphinx at Gizeh. By Lord Dunsany
18. The Priestess of Panormita. By Elaine Carr
19. The Temple of Solomon the King (Book II)
20. Amongst the Mermaids. By Norman Roe
21. Ave Adonai. By Aleister Crowley
22. The Man-Cover. By George Raffalovich
23. Stewed Prunes and Prism: The Tennyson Centenary. By A. Quiller, Jr.
24. Stop Press Reviews

==== Number 3 ====
1. Frontpages
2. Editorial
3. Liber XIII [vel Graduum Montis Abiegni: A Syllabus of the Steps Upon the Path]
4. AHA! By Aleister Crowley
5. The Herb Dangerous (Part III) : The Poem of Hashish. By Charles Baudelaire (Translated By Aleister Crowley)
6. An Origin. By Victor B. Neuburg
7. The Soul-Hunter
8. Madeleine. By Arthur F. Grimble
9. The Temple of Solomon the King (Book II "Continued")
10. The Coming of Apollo. By Victor B. Neuburg
11. The Brighton Mystery. By George Raffalovich
12. Reviews
13. The Shadowy Dill-Waters. By A. Quiller, Jr.
14. Stop Press Reviews and Endpages
- Special Supplement: Liber DCCCCLXIII. the Treasure-House of Images

==== Number 4 ====
1. Frontpages
2. Editorial
3. Liber III [vel Jugorum]
4. Liber A [vel Armorum sub Figura CCCCXII]
5. I.NST N.ATTURAE R.EGINA I.SIS. By Omnia Vincam
6. Reviews
7. My Lady of the Breeches. By George Raffalovich
8. Reviews
9. At Bordj-An-Nus. By Hilda Norfolk
10. ΑΙΝΟΖΙΔΟΖ. By Aleister Crowley
11. The Temple of Solomon the King. IV
12. Pan to Artemis. By Aleister Crowley
13. The Interpreter. By Perdurabo
14. The Daughter of the Horseleech. By Ethel Ramsay
15. The Dreamer
16. Mr. Todd. A Morality. By the Author of "Rosa Mundi" (William Butler Yeats)
17. The Gnome. By Victor B. Neuburg
18. Review
19. The Herb Dangerous. Part IV: the Hasheesh Eater
20. The Agnostic
21. The Mantra-Yogi
22. The Buddhist
23. The Violinist. By Francis Bendick
24. EHE! By George Raffalovich
25. Half-Hours with Famous Mahatmas. No. I. By Sam Hardy
26. The Thief-Taker. By Aleister Crowley
27. Review
28. The Eyes of St. Ljubov. By J. F. C. Fuller And George Raffalovich
29. Midsummer Eve. By Ethel Archer
30. The Poetical Memory
31. Adela
32. The Three Worms. By Edward Storer
33. The Felon Flower. By Ethel Archer
34. The Big Stick
35. Glaziers' Houses
36. In the Temple. By Victor B. Neuburg
37. Endpages
- Special Supplement: the High History of Sir Palamedes the Saracen Knight and of his Following the Questing Beast

==== Number 5 ====
1. Frontpages
2. Editorial
3. Liber HHH [sub figura CCCXLI]
4. The Blind Prophet. By Aleister Crowley
5. The Training of the Mind. By Ananda Metteya
6. The Sabbath. By Ethel Ramsay
7. The Temple of Solomon the King
8. A Nocturne. By Victor B. Neuburg
9. The Vixen. By Francis Bendick
10. The Pilgrim. By Aleister Crowley
11. My Crapulous Contemporaries, No. IV.—Wisdom While You Waite. By Aleister Crowley
12. X-Rays on Ex-Probationers. By Perdurabo
13. The Vampire. By Ethel Archer
14. The Big Stick
15. Correspondence
16. Stop Press Reviews
- Special Supplement: Liber CCCCXVIII (XXX Aerum) [vel Saecvli sub figura CCCCXVIII, Being of the Angels of the 30 Aethyrs, the Vision and the Voice]

==== Number 6 ====
1. Frontpagesf
2. Editorial
3. Liber X [Liber Porta Lucis]
4. Liber XVI [Liber Turris vel Domus Dei]
5. Liber XC [Liber Tzaddi vel Hamus Hermeticus]
6. Liber CLVI [Liber Cheth vel Vallum Abiegni]
7. Liber CC [Liber Resh vel Helios]
8. Liber CCCLXX [Liber A'Ash vel Capricorni Pneumatici]
9. Three Poems For Jane Cheron. By Aleister Crowley
10. Circe. By Ethel Archer
11. The Electric Silence
12. Song
13. The Scorpion. By Aleister Crowley
14. The Earth. By Francis Bendick
15. Sleep. By Ethel Archer
16. The Ordeal of Ida Pendragon. By Martial Nay
17. The Autumn Woods. By Victor Neuburg
18. The Dangers of Mysticism
19. The Big Stick. By John Yarker, E. Whineray, Aleister Crowley, Etc.
20. Endpages
- Special Supplement: The Rites of Eleusis

==== Number 7 ====
1. Frontpages
2. Editorial
3. Liber I [vel Magi]
4. Liber XI [Liber Nu]
5. Liber LXIV [Liber Israfel]
6. Liber LXVI [Liber Stellae Rubeae]
7. Liber CLXXV [Astarte vel Liber Berylli]
8. Liber CCVI [Liber Ru vel Spiritus]
9. Liber CCXXXI
10. Liber CD [Liber Tau vel Kabbalae Trium Literarum]
11. Liber CDLXXIV [Liber os Asbysmi vel Daath]
12. Liber DLV [Liber Had]
13. Liber DCCCXXXI [Liber Tau]
14. Liber CMXIII [Liber ThIShARB viae Memoriae]
15. Adonis. By Aleister Crowley
16. The Ghouls. By Aleister Crowley
17. The Four Winds. By Aleister Crowley
18. Independence. By Aleister Crowley
19. Showstorm. By Aleister Crowley
20. A Brief Abstract of the Symbolic Representation of the Universe Derived by Doctor John Dee through the Skrying of Sir Edward Kelley. By Aleister Crowley
21. Apollo Bestows the Violin. By Aleister Crowley
22. Diana of the Inlet. By Katharine Susannah Prichard
23. Silence. By Ethel Archer
24. Memory of Love. By Meredith Starr
25. Across the Gulf. By Aleister Crowley
26. The Temple of Solomon the King ("Continued")
27. My Crapulous Contemporaries. No. V., the Bismarck of Battersea. By A. Quiller, Jun. (Aleister Crowley)
28. Arthur in the Area Again. By Aleister Crowley
29. The Big Stick. Reviews By Aleister Crowley and John Yarker
30. A Birthday. By Aleister Crowley

==== Number 8 ====
1. Frontpages
2. Editorial
3. θέλημα : a Tone-Testament By Leila Waddell
4. Three Poems. By Victor B. Neuburg
5. The Temple of Solomon the King (continued)
6. His Secret Sin
7. Long Odds
8. Doctor Bob. A Sketch By Mary D'este and Aleister Crowley
9. The Woodcutter
10. La Foire. By Barbey De Rochechouart
11. Professor Zircon
12. A Brief Abstract of the Symbolic Representation of the Universe, Derived by Doctor John Dee through the Skrying of Sir Edward Kelly. Part II. The Forty-Eight Calls
13. Stepney
14. The Tell-Tale Heart. Adapted from the Story of E. A. Poe. By Aleister Crowley
15. Sorites
16. A Description of the Cards of the Tarot, with their Attributions; Including a Method of Divination by their Use
17. On-On-"Poet"
18. Elder Eel
19. The Spadger
20. To Persis
21. Waite's Wet or the Backslider's Return
22. My Crapulous Contemporaries. No. VI. An Obituary
23. The New Evelyn Hope
24. Reviews
- Special Supplement: Sepher Sephiroth

==== Number 9 ====
1. Frontpages
2. Editorial
3. The Temple of Solomon the King ("Continued")
4. Lines to a Young Lady Violinist on Her Playing in a Green Dress Designed By the Author
5. Energized Enthusiasm
6. The "Titanic"
7. A Literatooralooral Treasure-Trove
8. Threnody
9. Dischmatal by Night. By Arthur Grimble
10. A Quack Painter
11. At Sea
12. Cancer?
13. Dumb!
14. The Vitriol-Thrower
15. The Fairy Fiddler. By Ethel Archer
16. An Evocation of Bartzabel the Spirit of Mars
17. The Testament of Magdalen Blair
18. Ercildoune. By Aleister Crowley
19. Athanasius Contra Decanum
20. My Crapulous Contemporaries. No. VII. A Galahad in Gomorrah
21. How I Became a Famous Mountaineer. By Percy W. Newlands, P.R.A.S., P.R.B.S., P.R.C.S., P.R.Y.S., P.R.Z.S., Etc., Etc.
22. The Tango: A Sketch. By Mary D'este and Aleister Crowley
23. The Big Stick
24. Reviews

==== Number 10 ====
1. Frontpages
2. Editorial
3. Liber L. Vel Legis The Book of the Law
4. Liber ΒΑΤΡΑΧΟΦΕΝΟΒΟΟΚΟΣΜΟΜΑΧΙΑ Svb Figvra DXXXVI
5. A Syllabus of the Οfficial Ιnstructions of A∴ A∴
6. The Ship
7. As in a Glass, Darkly. By Arthur Grimble.
8. Two Fragments of Ritual
9. The Disciples
10. The Temple of Solomon the King ("Concluded)"
11. Rosa Ignota. By Victor B. Neuburg
12. The Game of Crowley
13. Boo to Buddha
14. Crowley Pool
15. Hymn to Satan
16. A Ballad of Bedlam. By Ethel Archer.
17. Dead Weight
18. The Big Stick
19. Colophon—To Laylah Eight-And-Twenty
20. Index to Volume I
21. Endpages
- Special Supplement: The Key of the Mysteries

=== Volume II ===
Volume II was never published. A common misconception is that the reason is the A.'.A.'. period of Silence. However this is not the case as Aleister Crowley later published Volume III No. 3 in 1936 – during an A.'.A.'. period of Silence. It is not known why Volume II was not published.

=== Volume III ===
- Number 1: The Blue Equinox
- Number 2: The Gospel According to St. Bernard Shaw
- Number 3: The Equinox of the Gods
- Number 4: Eight Lectures on Yoga
- Number 5: The Book of Thoth
- Number 6: Liber Aleph
- Number 7: Shih Yi
- Number 8: Tao Teh Ching
- Number 9: The Holy Books of Thelema
- Nunber 10: The Review of Scientific Illuminism

=== Volume IV ===
==== Number 1, Commentaries on the Holy Books and Other Papers ====
1. Occultism
2. One Star in Sight
3. Liber XXXIII. An Account of A∴A∴
4. Liber Collegii Sancti sub figura CLXXXV (Being the Tasks of the Grades and Their Oaths)
5. Liber Vesta vel פרכת sub figura DCC (Book of the Robes of the Order)
6. Liber DCLXXI vel Pyramidos: A Ritual of Self-Initiation Based Upon the Formula of the Neophyte
7. Four Paintings by J.F.C. Fuller
8. Liber VIII (The Ritual Proper for the Invocation of Augoeides)
9. Liber LXV with Commentary (Liber Cordis Cincti Serpente)
10. Liber LXXI, the Voice of the Silence with Commentary
11. Shorter Commentaries to the Holy Books

==== Number 2, The Vision and the Voice : With Commentary and Other Papers ====
1. Liber CDXVIII. The Vision and the Voice with Commentary
2. Liber CCCXXV. The Bartzabel Working
3. Liber LX. The Ab-ul-Diz Working
4. Liber CDXV. Opus Lutetianum, The Paris Working
5. Appendix I: Algerian Diary, 1909
6. Appendix II: Diary Fragment, 1910

== Motta Equinox ==
Published after Crowley's death, a series entitled The Equinox, Volume V was released by Marcelo Motta and his organization, Thelema Publishing Co.

- Vol. V, No. 1: The Commentaries to Liber AL vel Legis (1975)
- Vol. V, No. 2: Liber LXV and comments and writings by Marcelos Motta (1979)
- Vol. V, No. 3: The Chinese Texts of Magick and Mysticism (1980)
- Vol. V, No. 4: Sex and Religion (1981)
- Vol. VII, No. 1: The Red Equinox (1992)

== See also ==
- Aleister Crowley bibliography
- The New Equinox
