= Liber XV, The Gnostic Mass =

Religious ritual

Aleister Crowley wrote The Gnostic Mass — technically called Liber XV or "Book 15" — in 1913 while travelling in Moscow, Russia. He described it as representing "the original and true pre-Christian Christianity." The structure is similar to the Mass of the Eastern Orthodox Church and Roman Catholic Church, communicating the principles of Crowley's Thelema. It is the central rite of Ordo Templi Orientis and its ecclesiastical arm, Ecclesia Gnostica Catholica.

The ceremony calls for five officers: a Priest, a Priestess, a Deacon, and two adult acolytes, called "the Children". The end of the ritual culminates in the consummation of the eucharist, consisting of a goblet of wine and a Cake of Light, after which the congregant proclaims "There is no part of me that is not of the gods!"

== Publication ==
Crowley published the text of the Gnostic Mass three times: in 1918 in a publication called The International, in 1919 in The Equinox (III:1), and in 1929 in Magick in Theory and Practice. It was privately performed while Crowley was at the Abbey of Thelema in Sicily, Italy, and its first public performance was March 19, 1933 by Wilfred T. Smith and Regina Kahl in Hollywood, California at the first Agape Lodge.

Crowley explains why he wrote the Gnostic Mass in his Confessions:

While dealing with this subject I may as well outline its scope completely. Human nature demands (in the case of most people) the satisfaction of the religious instinct, and, to very many, this may best be done by ceremonial means. I wished therefore to construct a ritual through which people might enter into ecstasy as they have always done under the influence of appropriate ritual. In recent years, there has been an increasing failure to attain this object, because the established cults shock their intellectual convictions and outrage their common sense. Thus their minds criticize their enthusiasm; they are unable to consummate the union of their individual souls with the universal soul as a bridegroom would be to consummate his marriage if his love were constantly reminded that its assumptions were intellectually absurd.

I resolved that my Ritual should celebrate the sublimity of the operation of universal forces without introducing disputable metaphysical theories. I would neither make nor imply any statement about nature which would not be endorsed by the most materialistic man of science. On the surface this may sound difficult; but in practice I found it perfectly simple to combine the most rigidly rational conceptions of phenomena with the most exalted and enthusiastic celebration of their sublimity.

== Temple ==
There are four main pieces of furniture in a Gnostic Mass temple:

The High Altar: the dimensions are 7 feet (2.1 m) long by 3 feet (0.91 m) wide by 44 inches (1,100 mm) high. It is covered with a crimson cloth. It is situated in the East, or in the direction of Boleskine House—Crowley's former estate—on the shores of Loch Ness in Scotland ("Temple East"). The two-tiered super-altar sits on top of the High Altar. It all holds 22 candles, the Stele of Revealing, the Book of the Law, the Cup, and two bunches of roses. There is room for the Paten, and the Priestess to sit.

The High Altar is contained within a great Veil, and sits on a dais with three steps. On either side of the High Altar are two pillars, countercharged in black and white.

The Altar of Incense: to the West of the Dais is a black altar made of superimposed cubes.

The Font: this is a small circular item which is able to contain or hold water.

The Tomb: this is generally a small, enclosing space with an entrance that is covered by a veil. It should be big enough to hold the Priest, Deacon and the two Children.

== Structure ==
There are six component ceremonies within the Gnostic Mass:

=== Ceremony of the Introit ===
The congregation enters the temple, the Deacon presents the Law of Thelema, and the Gnostic Creed is recited. The Priestess and the Children enter from a side room. The Priestess raises the Priest from his Tomb, then purifies, consecrates, robes and crowns him.

=== Ceremony of the Rending of the Veil ===
The Priestess is enthroned at the High Altar and the veil is closed. The Priest circumambulates the temple and he ascends to the veil. The officers give their orations, including the Calendar by the Deacon. The Priest then opens the veil and kneels at the High Altar.

=== Collects ===
Eleven prayers addressed to the Sun, Moon, Lord, Lady, Gnostic Saints, Earth, Principles, Birth, Marriage, Death, and The End.

=== Consecration of the Elements ===
The preparation of the Cake of Light.

=== Anthem ===
Of the Anthem, Crowley writes in Confessions:

During this period [i.e. around 1913] the full interpretation of the central mystery of freemasonry became clear in consciousness, and I expressed it in dramatic form in The Ship. The lyrical climax is in some respects my supreme achievement in invocation; in fact, the chorus beginning: "Thou who art I beyond all I am..." seemed to me worthy to be introduced as the anthem into the Ritual of the Gnostic Catholic Church.

=== Mystic Marriage and Consummation of the Elements ===
The Cake of Light is perfected and consumed. The Priest gives the final benediction. The Priest, Deacon, and Children exit. The People exit.

== Narrative ==
The People enter into the ritual space, where the Deacon stands at the Altar of Incense (symbolic of Tiphareth on the Tree of Life). She takes the Book of the Law and places it on the super-altar within the great Veil, and proclaims the Law of Thelema in the name of IAO. Returning, she leads the People in the Gnostic Creed, which announces a belief (or value) in the Lord, the Sun, Chaos, Air, Babalon, Baphomet, the Gnostic Catholic Church, the communion of Saints, the Miracle of the Mass (i.e. the Eucharist), as well as confessions of their birth as incarnate beings and the eternal cycle of their individual lives.

The Virgin then enters with the two Children, and greets the People. She moves in a serpentine manner around the Altar of Incense and the Font (symbolizing the unwinding of the Kundalini Serpent which is twined around the base of the spine) before stopping at the Tomb. She tears down the veil with her Sword, and raises the Priest to life by the power of Iron, the Sun, and the Lord. He is lustrated and consecrated with the four elements (water and earth, fire and air), and then invested with his scarlet Robe and crowned with the golden Uraeus serpent of wisdom. Finally, she gently strokes his Lance eleven times, invoking the Lord.

The Priest lifts up the Virgin and takes her to the High Altar, seating her "upon the summit of the Earth." After he purifies and consecrates her, he closes the Veil and circumambulates the temple three times, followed by the remaining officers. They take their place before the Altar of Incense, kneeling in adoration (along with all the People), while the Priest takes the first step upon the Dais before the Veil and begins his first oration, invoking Nuit, the goddess of the infinite night sky. The Priestess calls to him as Nuit, enticing the Priest to ascend to her. He then takes the second step, and identifies as Hadit, the infinitely condensed center of all things — the Fire of every star and the Life in every person. The Deacon leads the congregation to rise and he delivers the Calendar. The Priest takes his third and final step before the Veil, invoking Ra-Hoor-Khuit, (Note: Saying "A ka dua / Tuf ur biu / Bi a’a chefu / Dudu nur af an nuteru.") the Crowned and Conquering Child of the New Aeon. With his Lance, he parts the Veil, revealing the Priestess who sits (typically naked) upon the High Altar. He greets her with the masculine powers of Pan and she returns it with eleven kisses on the Lance. He kneels in adoration.

The Deacon then recites the eleven Collects, which include the Sun, Moon, Lord, Lady, Saints, Earth, Principles, Birth, Marriage, Death, and the End.

The Elements are then consecrated by the Virtue of the Lance, transforming the bread into the Body of God and the wine into the Blood of God. Of these, the Priest makes a symbolic offering to On, being our Lord the Sun.

The Priest and all the People then recite the Anthem.

The Priest blesses the Elements in the name of the Lord, and also states the essential function of the entire operation, which is to bestow health, wealth, strength, joy, peace, and the perpetual happiness that is the successful fulfillment of will. He breaks off a piece of one of the hosts, and, placing it on the tip of the Lance, both he and the Priestess depress it into the Cup, crying "Hriliu" (which Crowley translated as "the shrill scream of orgasm").

The Priest entreats Baphomet—"O Lion and O Serpent"—to be "mighty among us." He then declares the Law of Thelema to the People—"Do what thou wilt shall be the whole of the Law"—who respond with "Love is the law, love under will." He finally partakes of the Eucharist with the words, "In my mouth be the essence of the life of the Sun" (with the Host) and "In my mouth be the essence of the joy of the earth" (with the Wine). He turns to the People and declares, "There is no part of me that is not of the Gods."

The People then follow in Communication, one at a time, much as the Priest did, by partaking of a whole goblet of wine and a Cake of Light. They make the same proclamation of godhood as did the Priest. Afterwards, the Priest encloses the Priestess within the Veil, and delivers the final benediction:

+ The LORD bless you.
+ The LORD enlighten your minds and comfort your hearts and sustain your bodies.
+ The LORD bring you to the accomplishment of your true Wills, the Great Work, the Summum Bonum, True Wisdom and Perfect Happiness.

The Priest, Deacon, and Children then retire to the Tomb and return the torn veil. The People exit.

== Gnostic Creed ==
The creed of Ecclesia Gnostica Catholica—also known as the Gnostic Creed—is recited in the Gnostic Mass, during the Ceremony of the Introit.

The text of the Creed is as follows:

I believe in one secret and ineffable LORD; and in one Star in the Company of Stars of whose fire we are created, and to which we shall return; and in one Father of Life, Mystery of Mystery, in His name CHAOS, the sole viceregent of the Sun upon the Earth; and in one Air the nourisher of all that breathes.
And I believe in one Earth, the Mother of us all, and in one Womb wherein all men are begotten, and wherein they shall rest, Mystery of Mystery, in Her name BABALON.
And I believe in the Serpent and the Lion, Mystery of Mystery, in His name BAPHOMET.
And I believe in one Gnostic and Catholic Church of Light, Life, Love and Liberty, the Word of whose Law is THELEMA.
And I believe in the communion of Saints.
And, forasmuch as meat and drink are transmuted in us daily into spiritual substance, I believe in the Miracle of the Mass.
And I confess one Baptism of Wisdom whereby we accomplish the Miracle of Incarnation.
And I confess my life one, individual, and eternal that was, and is, and is to come.
AUMGN. AUMGN. AUMGN.

== See also ==
- Magical formula – Words expressing a process in ceremonial magic
- Sex magic – Magic involving sexual activity
- Worship of heavenly bodies – Worship of stars and other heavenly bodies as deities
