= Ordo Templi Orientis =

International secret society

- Lamen of Ordo Templi Orientis
- Formation: 1895; 131 years ago
- Type: Magical organization
- Outer Head of the Order: Carl Kellner; (1895–1905); Theodor Reuss; (1905–1923); Aleister Crowley; (1925–1947); Karl Germer; (1947–1962); William Breeze; (2014– )
- Website: www.oto.org

Ordo Templi Orientis (O.T.O.; lit. 'Order of the Temple of the East' or 'Order of Oriental Templars') is an occult secret society and hermetic magical organization founded at the beginning of the 20th century. The origins of O.T.O. can be traced back to the German-speaking occultists Carl Kellner, Theodor Reuss, Heinrich Klein, and Franz Hartmann. In its first incarnation, O.T.O. was intended to be modelled after and associated with European Freemasonry; as such, in its early years, only Freemasons could seek admittance.

Founder and first head of the Order Carl Kellner wanted to create an Academia Masonica wherein various rites of high-degree Freemasonry could be conferred within German-speaking countries. During the course of his esoteric studies across the globe and from many traditions, Kellner believed that he had discovered a key which offered a clear explanation of all the complex symbolism of Freemasonry and of nature itself. Kellner intended that O.T.O. preserve and confer this key.

After the death of Reuss, the English writer and occultist Aleister Crowley assumed control of the Order. Crowley had been inducted into O.T.O. by Reuss in the early 1910s. While maintaining many core elements of Freemasonry and the intentions of both Kellner and Reuss, O.T.O. was drastically changed by Crowley. The guiding philosophy of O.T.O. from this point on became Crowley's self-created occult system, Thelema. With this change O.T.O. ceased its bestowal of Masonic degrees and membership requirements.

After Crowley's death in 1947, four main branches of O.T.O. claimed exclusive descent from the original organization and primacy over the other ones. Courts have ruled that the organization incorporated by Crowley's student Grady McMurtry in 1979 is the legal continuation of the Order and is the exclusive owner of the names, trademarks, copyrights and other assets of Crowley's O.T.O.

== History ==
=== Origins ===
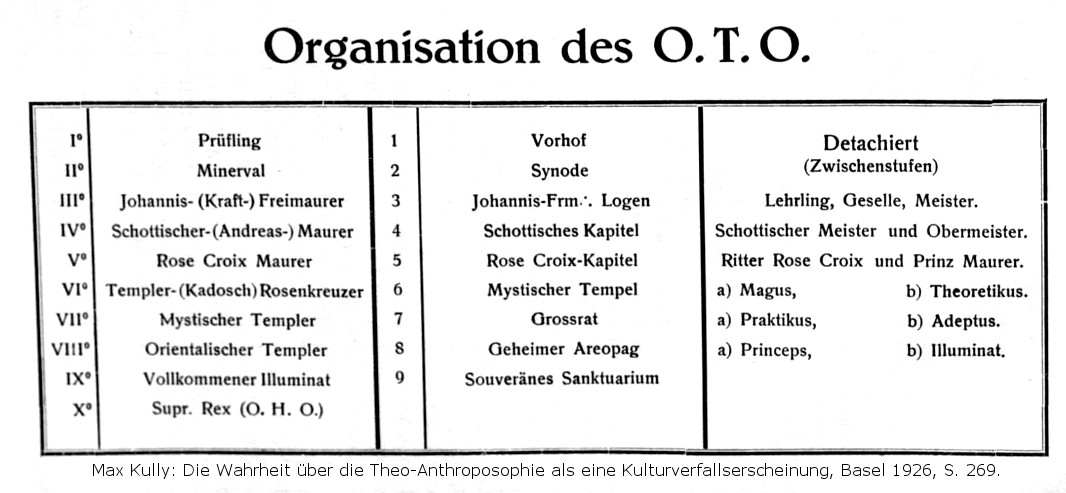
Organisation of O.T.O., the diagram (from 1926) in German shows the organization's original structure.

The early history of O.T.O. is difficult to trace reliably. It originated in Germany or Austria between 1895 and 1906. Its apparent founder was Carl Kellner (1851–1905) (probably with the German spelling Karl), a wealthy Austrian industrialist, in 1895 (although nothing verifiable is known of the Order until 1904). Kellner wanted to establish an Academia Masonica within which high-grade Freemasonic degrees could be conferred in German-speaking nations.

Theodor Reuss (1855–1923) collaborated with Kellner in creating O.T.O. and succeeded him as head of O.T.O. after Kellner's death. Under Reuss, charters were given to occult brotherhoods in France, Denmark, Switzerland, the United States, and Austria. There were ten degrees, of which the first five were Masonic.

In 1902, Reuss, along with Franz Hartmann and Henry Klein, purchased the right to perform the Rite of Memphis and Mizraim of Freemasonry from the English Freemason John Yarker, the authority of which was confirmed in 1904 and again in 1905. Although these rites are considered to be irregular, they, along with the Swedenborg Rite formed the core of the newly established Order. Kellner, Reuss, Hartmann, and Klein acquired authority to operate the rites of the Martinist Order from the French occultist Gérard Encausse and a clandestine form of the Scottish Rite deriving from Joseph Cerneau. From William Wynn Westcott, Reuss acquired a warrant to start a college of the Societas Rosicruciana in Anglia in Germany.

In 1902, Reuss began publishing a masonic journal, The Oriflamme, as the organ of these collected rites. Reuss's rites aroused some degree of curiosity in the German-speaking Masonic milieu, as high degree Freemasonry had not been very widespread in Germany during the 1800s. O.T.O. had several hundred members and affiliates at its peak, but by 1905 and after Kellner's death, Reuss began to lose his supporters. He was attacked in Masonic periodicals for his alleged lack of Masonic regularity and credentials, and for the alleged homosexual elements in Reuss's initiations. Reuss left Germany and moved to London in 1906, and lost control of most of the lodges previously belonging to the O.T.O. network.

In 1908, Encausse invited to Reuss to an "International Masonic Conference", where he probably met Joanny Bricaud and was introduced to his Gnostic Catholic Church (E.G.C.), an off-shoot of Jules Doinel's Église Gnostique. Later O.T.O. documents would present the Order being linked to the E.G.C, and subsequently portray the E.G.C. of O.T.O. as being autonomous with respect to Bricaud's organization.

The sex magic of the higher O.T.O. degrees appears to be based on the writings of the American occultist Paschal Beverly Randolph (1825–1875), which were adopted by the Hermetic Brotherhood of Luxor (or of Light), another group with which Kellner had been in contact and whose teachings he said he had incorporated into O.T.O. The scholar Marco Pasi said, however, that there is no evidence in support of this, and suggests that Reuss acquired sexual ideas and techniques from Yarker, who had in his possession certain unpublished writings by Randolph.

=== Under Reuss's leadership ===
Reuss met Aleister Crowley and in 1910 admitted him to the first three degrees of O.T.O. Two years later, Crowley was placed in charge of Great Britain and Ireland, and was advanced to the X° (tenth degree). The appointment included the opening of the British section of O.T.O., which was called the Mysteria Mystica Maxima or the M∴M∴M∴. Crowley then went to Berlin to obtain instructional manuscripts and the title of Supreme and Holy King of Ireland, Iona and all the Britains within the Sanctuary of the Gnosis. Within the year, Crowley had written the Manifesto of the M∴M∴M∴ which described its basic ten-degree system with Kellner's three degree Academia Masonica forming the seventh, eighth and ninth degrees.

In 1913, Crowley composed the Gnostic Mass while in Moscow, which he described as being the Order's "central ceremony of its public and private celebration". In 1914, soon after World War I broke out, he moved to the United States. It was around this time that Crowley decided to integrate Thelema into the O.T.O. system, and in 1915 prepared revised rituals for use in the M∴M∴M∴.

In 1917, Reuss wrote a Synopsis of Degrees of O.T.O. in which the third degree was listed as "Craft of Masonry" and listed the initiations involved as "Entered Apprentice, Fellow Craft, Master Mason" and elaborated on this with "Full instruction in Craft Masonry, including the Catechism of the first three degrees, and an explanation of all the various Masonic systems". The same document shows that the fourth degree of O.T.O. is also known as the Holy Royal Arch of Enoch. It was summarized by Reuss as the Degree of "Scotch Masonry", equivalent to "Scotch Mason, Knight of St. Andrew, Royal Arch", and he described it as "Full instruction in the Scottish degrees of Ancient and Accepted Masonry".

In 1919, Crowley attempted to work this Masonic-based O.T.O. in Detroit, Michigan. The result was that he was rebuffed by the Council of the Scottish Rite on the basis that O.T.O. rituals were too similar to orthodox Masonry. He described this in a 1930 letter to Arnold Krumm-Heller:

However, when it came to the considerations of the practical details of the rituals to be worked, the general Council of the Scottish Rite could not see its way to tolerate them, on the ground that the symbolism in some places touched too nearly that of the orthodox Masonry of the Lodges.

Crowley subsequently rewrote the initiation rituals of the first three degrees, and in doing so removed most of those rituals' ties to Masonry. He did not, however, rewrite the fourth degree ritual, which remains in its form and structure related to the various Royal Arch rituals of Masonry.

=== Under Crowley's leadership ===
Crowley wrote that Theodore Reuss suffered a stroke in the spring of 1920. In correspondence with one of Reuss's officers, Crowley expressed doubts about Reuss's competence to remain in office. Relations between Reuss and Crowley began to deteriorate, and the two exchanged angry letters in November 1921. Crowley informed Reuss that he was availing himself of Reuss's abdication from office and proclaiming himself Outer Head of the Order. Reuss died on October 28, 1923, without designating a successor, though Crowley wrote in later correspondence that Reuss had designated him. Crowley's biographer Lawrence Sutin, among others, casts doubt on this, though there is no evidence for or against it, and no other candidate stepped forward to refute Crowley by offering proof of succession. In 1925, during a tumultuous Conference of Grand Masters, Crowley was officially elected as Outer Head of the Order (or O.H.O.) by the remaining administrative heads of O.T.O.

During this period, O.T.O. members outside of the USA rarely came into contact with one another.:

I am arranging to send you the official papers connected to the O.T.O. but the idea that you should meet other members first is quite impossible. Even after affiliation, you would not meet anyone unless it were necessary for you to work in cooperation with them. I am afraid you have still got the idea that the Great Work is a tea party. Contact with other students only means that you criticize their hats, and then their morals; and I am not going to encourage this. Your work is not anybody else’s, and undirected chatter is the worst poisonous element in a humane society.

— Aleister Crowley in Magick Without Tears

Since the total membership of O.T.O. at that time was counted in the dozens rather than in hundreds or thousands, this may simply have been Crowley's attempt at disguising the low numbers.

During World War II, the European branches of O.T.O. were either destroyed or driven underground. By the end of the war, the only surviving O.T.O. body was Agapé Lodge in California, although there were various initiates in different countries. Very few initiations were being performed. At this time, Karl Germer, who had been Crowley's representative in Germany, migrated to the United States after being released from Nazi confinement. On March 14, 1942, Crowley appointed him as his successor as Outer Head of the Order, and Germer filled the office after the death of Crowley in 1947.

=== After Crowley's death ===
After Crowley's death, Germer attempted to keep O.T.O. running, with questionable success. Crowley had granted a charter to run an O.T.O. Camp in England to Gerald Gardner, and Germer acknowledged Gardner as O.T.O.'s main representative in Europe. The two men met in 1948 in New York to discuss plans, but Gardner's continuing ill health led to Germer replacing him with Frederic Mellinger in 1951. Also in 1951, Germer granted a charter to run an O.T.O. Camp in England to Kenneth Grant, who had briefly served as Crowley's secretary during the 1940s. Grant was to be expelled and his charter revoked in 1955 however, and from that time onwards O.T.O.'s representative in the UK was a IX° member, Noel Fitzgerald.

Germer died in 1962 without naming a successor. It was not until 1969 that Grady McMurtry invoked his letter of emergency authorization from Crowley and became the Frater Superior of O.T.O. McMurtry did not claim the title of Outer Head of the Order, stating in 1974 that "There is at present no Outer Head of the Order for Aleister Crowley's Ordo Templi Orientis. The Outer Head of the Order is an international office (see p. 201, The Blue Equinox) and Aleister Crowley's Ordo Templi Orientis is not at this time established organizationally to fulfill the requirements of its Constitution in this respect." He began performing initiations in 1970. O.T.O. was incorporated under the laws of the State of California on March 26, 1979. The corporation attained federal tax exemption as a religious entity under IRS Code 501(c)3 in 1982. Grady McMurtry died in 1985.

McMurtry requested that members of the Sovereign Sanctuary of the Gnosis (i.e. the members of the Ninth Degree) elect the next Caliph, which they did in 1985. William Breeze was elected, taking the name Hymenaeus Beta. In the Fall 1995 issue of The Magical Link, he is designated "Hymenaeus Beta X°"; in the Fall 1997 issue of The Magical Link, he is designated "Hymenaeus Beta XI°"; by May 2005, he is designated "O.H.O. Hymenaeus Beta XII°" on the O.T.O. website.

In 1996, Sabazius X° was appointed as National Grand Master General (G.M.G.) for the U.S. Grand Lodge. In 2005, Frater Hyperion X° was appointed the National G.M.G. of the newly formed UK Grand Lodge. Frater Shiva X° was appointed the G.M.G. of the Australia Grand Lodge in 2006. In 2014, Frater Abrasax X° was appointed the National G.M.G. of the newly formed Grand Lodge of Croatia, and Frater Phanes X° was appointed the National G.M.G. of the newly formed Grand Lodge of Italy. On October 14, 2014, these five National Grand Masters elected Hymenaeus Beta as "de jure" Outer Head of the Order.

== Philosophy ==
O.T.O. was described by Crowley as the "first of the great Old Æon orders to accept The Book of the Law". O.T.O. originally borrowed ritual material from irregular Masonic organizations, and although some related symbolism and language remains in use, the context has changed to Thelema and its tenets.

The Order offers esoteric instruction through dramatic ritual, guidance in a system of illuminated ethics, and fellowship among aspirants to the Great Work of realizing the divine in the human.

O.T.O. has two core areas of ritual activity: initiation into the Mysteries, and the celebration of Liber XV, the Gnostic Mass. In addition, the Order organizes lectures, classes, social events, theatrical productions and artistic exhibitions, publishes books and journals, and provides instruction in Hermetic science, yoga, and magick.

Crowley wrote in his Confessions:

... O.T.O. is in possession of one supreme secret. The whole of its system [is] directed towards communicating to its members, by progressively plain hints, this all-important instruction.

Of the first set of initiations, he wrote:

... the main objects of the instruction [are] two. It [is] firstly necessary to explain the universe and the relations of human life therewith. Secondly, to instruct every man [and woman] how best to adapt his [or her] life to the cosmos and to develop his faculties to the utmost advantage. I accordingly constructed a series of rituals, Minerval, Man, Magician, Master-Magician, Perfect Magician and Perfect Initiate, which should illustrate the course of human life in its largest philosophical aspect.

The initiation rituals after the V° (fifth degree) are such that:

the candidate is instructed in the value of discretion, loyalty, independence, truthfulness, courage, self-control, indifference to circumstance, impartiality, skepticism, and other virtues, and at the same time assisted him to discover for himself the nature of [the supreme] secret, the proper object of its employment and the best means for insuring success for its use.

Of the entire system of O.T.O., Crowley wrote in Confessions:

It offers a rational basis for universal brotherhood and for universal religion. It puts forward a scientific statement which is a summary of all that is at present known about the universe by means of a simple, yet sublime symbolism, artistically arranged. It also enables each man to discover for himself his personal destiny, indicates the moral and intellectual qualities which he requires in order to fulfill it freely, and finally puts in his hands an unimaginably powerful weapon that he may use to develop in himself every faculty which he may need in his work.

== Initiation and teachings ==
Membership in O.T.O. is based upon a system of initiation ceremonies (or degrees) that use ritual drama to establish fraternal bonds between members as well as impart spiritual and philosophical teachings.

The degrees serve an organizational function, in that certain degrees must be attained before taking on various forms of service in the Order (e.g. taking the degree of K.E.W. is a requirement for ordination as a priest or priestess in Ecclesia Gnostica Catholica).

There are thirteen numbered degrees and twelve un-numbered degrees which are divided into three grades or "triads"—the Hermit, the Lover, and the Man of Earth.

Admittance to each degree of O.T.O. involves an initiation and the swearing of an oath which according to O.T.O is similar to those used in Freemasonry.

Advancement through the Man of Earth triad requires sponsorship from ranking members. Advancement into the degree of the Knight of the East and West and beyond requires one to be invited by ranking members.

The ultimate goal of initiation in O.T.O. is "to instruct the individual by allegory and symbol in the profound mysteries of Nature, and thereby to assist each to discover his or her own true Identity".

The entire system is as follows:

=== Man of Earth triad ===
- 0°—Minerval
- I°—Man & Brother or Woman & Sister
- II°—Magician
- III°—Master Magician
- IV°—Perfect Magician & Companion of the Holy Royal Arch of Enoch
  - P.I.—Perfect Initiate, or Prince of Jerusalem

=== Outside all triads ===
- Knight of the East & West

=== Lover's triad ===
- V°—
  - Sovereign Prince Rose-Croix, and Knight of the Pelican & Eagle
  - Knight of the Red Eagle, and Member of the Senate of Knight Hermetic Philosophers
- VI°—
  - Illustrious Knight (Templar) of the Order of Kadosch, and Companion of the Holy Graal
  - Grand Inquisitor Commander, and Member of the Grand Tribunal
  - Prince of the Royal Secret
- VII°—
  - Theoreticus, and Very Illustrious Sovereign Grand Inspector General
  - Magus of Light, and Bishop of Ecclesia Gnostica Catholica
  - Grandmaster of Light, and Inspector of Rites & Degrees

=== Hermit's triad ===
- VIII°—
  - Perfect Pontiff of the Illuminati
  - Epopt of the Illuminati
- IX°—Initiate of the Sanctuary of the Gnosis
- X°—Rex Summus Sanctissimus
- XI°—Initiate of the Eleventh Degree (This degree is technical, and has no relation to the general plan of the Order)
- XII°—Frater Superior, and Outer Head of the Order

== Structure ==
The governing bodies of O.T.O. include:

1. International Headquarters
  - Presided over by the Outer Head of the Order XII° (O.H.O.—also known as Frater Superior)
  - Supreme Council
  - Revolutionaries
2. Sovereign Sanctuary of the Gnosis of the IX°
3. Secret Areopagus of the Illuminati of the VIII°
4. Grand Tribunal of the VI°
5. National Grand Lodge
  - Presided over by the National Grand Master X°
  - Executive Council
6. Supreme Grand Council
7. Electoral College

=== International ===
1. The International Headquarters is the body that governs O.T.O. worldwide. As a ruling body, it is known as the International Supreme Council, which consists of the Outer Head of the Order (O.H.O.—also known as Frater Superior), the Secretary-General, and the Treasurer General.
2. The Sovereign Sanctuary of the Gnosis consists of members who have reached the IX°. Their prime duty is to study and practice the theurgy and thaumaturgy of the degree, consisting of the Supreme Secret of the Order. However, as a ruling body, they have the authority to
  - ratify and overturn the rulings of the Areopagus
  - act as representatives of the O.H.O. and National Grand Masters when need arises
  - fill the office of Revolutionary
  - vote within the Secret Areopagus
  - have some powers over the installation and removal of the O.H.O. and National Grand Masters
3. The Secret Areopagus of the Illuminati is a philosophical Governing Body composed of those who have reached the VIII°. It has the authority to reverse the decisions of the Grand Tribunal.
4. The Grand Tribunal is composed of members of the degree of Grand Inquisitor Commander (a sub-degree of the VI°). Their primary duty is to hear and arbitrate disputes and complaints not resolved at the level of Chapters and Lodges.

=== National ===
1. At the national level, the highest body is the Grand Lodge, which is ruled by the National Grand Master. Within the Grand Lodge is an Executive Council, which consists of the Board of Directors, who are the National Grand Master, the Grand Secretary General, and the Grand Treasurer General.
2. The Supreme Grand Council consists of members of the VII° appointed by the National Grand Master X°. They are charged with:
  - the government of the whole of the Lovers Triad
  - Hearing and deciding appeals of the decisions of the Electoral College
  - Hearing reports of the Sovereign Grand Inspectors General VII° as to the affairs of the Initiate members of the Lovers Triad
3. The Electoral College consists of eleven members of the V° and is the first of the governing bodies. Its primary duty is to oversee the affairs of the Man of Earth Triad.

O.T.O. has a federally recognized tax-exempt status in the United States under IRS section 501c(3). It also has California charitable corporation status.

==== Grand Lodges ====
The US Grand Lodge is the governing body of O.T.O. in the United States. The U.S. National Grand Master is Sabazius X°, who was appointed in 1996.

According to its website, the Mission Statement of U.S.G.L. is as follows:

Ordo Templi Orientis U.S.A. is the U.S. Grand Lodge (National Section) of Ordo Templi Orientis, a hierarchical, religious membership organization. Our mission is to effect and promote the doctrines and practices of the philosophical and religious system known as Thelema, with particular emphasis on cultivating the ideals of individual liberty, self-discipline, self-knowledge, and universal brotherhood. To this end, we conduct sacramental and initiatory rites, offer guidance and instruction to our members, organize social events, and engage in educational and community service activities at locations throughout the United States.

As of Feb 28, 2014, US Grand Lodge had 1,508 members in 62 local bodies. The UK Grand Lodge is the governing body of O.T.O. in the United Kingdom. The UK National Grand Master is Frater Hyperion X°, who was appointed in 2005 (93 years after the last Grand Master for the UK, Aleister Crowley, was elevated to that office). The Australian Grand Lodge is the governing body of O.T.O. in Australia and its territories were chartered in April 2006. The A.G.L. National Grand Master is Frater Shiva X°. The Croatian Grand Lodge is the governing body of O.T.O. in Croatia and its territories, chartered in May 2014. The C.G.L. National Grand Master is Frater Abrasax X°. The Italian Grand Lodge is the governing body of O.T.O. in Italy and its territories, chartered in May 2014. The I.G.L. National Grand Master is Frater Phanes X°.

=== Gnostic Catholic Church ===
Ecclesia Gnostica Catholica, also called the "Gnostic Catholic Church", is the ecclesiastical arm of O.T.O. Its central activity is the celebration of Liber XV, The Gnostic Mass. In recent years, other rites have been written and approved for use within the church. These include baptism, confirmation (into the laity), and ordination (for deacons, priests, priestesses, and bishops), and last rites.

=== Bodies ===
At the Man of Earth level, there are three levels of Local Body, which are Camps, Oases, and Lodges.

1. Camps tend to be the smallest and are not required to perform initiations. They are encouraged to celebrate the Gnostic Mass.
2. Oases must be capable of initiating through the III° and are required to perform the Gnostic Mass six times yearly.
3. Lodges are expected to celebrate the Gnostic Mass on a regular basis, work towards establishing a permanent temple, and have the ability to initiate through IV°/P.I.
4. Chapters of Rose Croix are bodies established by members of the Lover Grade. A Chapter is headed by a Most Wise Sovereign. They are generally charged with arranging social activities, such as plays, banquets, and dances. They also work to promote harmony among the members through tact and friendliness.
5. Guilds are groups recognized by O.T.O. International designed to promote a profession, trade, science, or craft. Subject to approval by the Areopagus, they make their own regulations and coordinate their own efforts. There are currently three Guilds: the Psychology Guild, the Translators' Guild, and the Information Technology Guild.
6. The term sanctuary is sometimes used to indicate a group of initiates organized for E.G.C. activities. This designation currently reflects no formal chartering process or official standing within the Order.

== Questions of legitimacy ==
After Crowley's death, several different organizations put themselves forward as legitimate continuations of Ordo Templi Orientis, both before and after McMurtry revived O.T.O. in California.

Although Karl Germer expelled Kenneth Grant from O.T.O. in 1955, Grant presented himself as Outer Head of Ordo Templi Orientis in a series of influential books. His organization is now known as the Typhonian Order.

Marcelo Ramos Motta (1931–1987), wrote that his O.T.O. membership was conferred personally by Karl Germer. United States First Circuit Court of Appeals found that was initiated into O.T.O. by Germer in California in 1955 or 1956. Motta asserted that Germer's wife Sasha had told him that Germer's last words had designated Motta as "the follower". He unsuccessfully sued for ownership of the Crowley copyrights in the U.S. District Court in Maine.

=== Court cases ===
In Australia in 2005, O.T.O. began a defamation case against the site GaiaGuys for material put up on their website that directly accused O.T.O., particularly in Australia, of participating in acts of child abuse and sacrifice. The court found in favour of O.T.O.

In June 2008, O.T.O. won a trademark case on appeal in the UK: "OTO", "O.T.O." "Ordo Templi Orientis" and the OTO Lamen were confirmed to be trademarks of the order.

== See also ==
- Esotericism in Germany and Austria
- Members of Ordo Templi Orientis
