= Jack Parsons =

American rocket engineer (1914–1952)

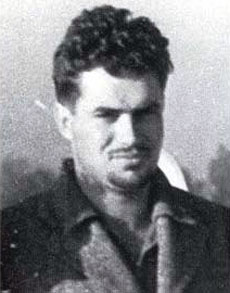
- Parsons in 1941
- Born: Marvel Whiteside Parsons; October 2, 1914; Los Angeles, California, U.S.
- Died: June 17, 1952 (aged 37); Pasadena, California, U.S.
- Cause of death: Explosion
- Resting place: Mojave Desert
- Other name: John Whiteside Parsons
- Education: Pasadena Junior College; Stanford University; University of Southern California; (no degrees)
- Occupations: Rocket engineer; scientist; businessman; occultist
- Organizations: Jet Propulsion Laboratory; California Institute of Technology; Aerojet Engineering Corporation; North American Aviation; Hughes Aircraft Company
- Spouses: Helen Northrup (m. 1935; div. 1946); Marjorie Cameron (m. 1946)

John Whiteside Parsons (born Marvel Whiteside Parsons; (Note: Parsons' name was never formally changed. Although legal documents referred to him as John, the obituary at his funeral used his birth name, and his death certificate refers to him as "Marvel aka John". (Carter 2004, pp. 2, 182, 199).) October 2, 1914 – June 17, 1952) was an American rocket engineer, chemist, and Thelemite occultist. Parsons was one of the principal founders of both the Jet Propulsion Laboratory (JPL) and Aerojet. He invented the first rocket engine to use a castable, composite rocket propellant, and pioneered the advancement of both liquid-fuel and solid-fuel rockets.

Parsons was raised in Pasadena, California. He began amateur rocket experiments with school friend Edward Forman in 1928. Parsons was admitted to Stanford University but left before graduating due to financial hardship during the Great Depression. In 1934, Parsons, Forman, and Frank Malina formed the Caltech-affiliated Guggenheim Aeronautical Laboratory (GALCIT) Rocket Research Group, with support by GALCIT chairman Theodore von Kármán. The group worked on Jet-Assisted Take Off (JATO) for the U.S. military, and founded Aerojet in 1942 to develop and sell JATO technology during World War II. The GALCIT Rocket Research Group became JPL in 1943.

In 1939, Parsons converted to Thelema, a religious movement founded by English occultist Aleister Crowley. Parsons and his first wife, Helen Northrup, joined Crowley's Ordo Templi Orientis (O.T.O.); he became the California O.T.O. branch leader in 1942. Historians of Western esotericism cite him as a prominent figure in propagating Thelema in North America. Parsons was dismissed from JPL and Aerojet in 1944, due to his involvement with O.T.O. and his hazardous laboratory practices. In 1945, he and Helen divorced. In 1946, he married Marjorie Cameron. Shortly afterward, L. Ron Hubbard defrauded Parsons of his life savings.

Parsons worked as an explosives expert during the late 1940s, but his career in rocketry ended due to accusations of espionage and the increasing trend of McCarthyism. Parsons died at the age of 37 in a home laboratory explosion in 1952; his death was officially ruled an accident but many of his associates suspected suicide or murder. Although publicly unknown during his lifetime, Parsons is now recognized for his innovations in rocket engineering, advocacy of space exploration and human spaceflight, and as an important figure in the history of the U.S. space program. He has been the subject of several biographies and fictionalized portrayals.

== Biography ==
=== Early life: 1914–1934 ===
Marvel Whiteside Parsons was born on October 2, 1914, at the Good Samaritan Hospital in Los Angeles. His parents, Ruth Virginia Whiteside (c. 1893–1952) and Marvel H. Parsons (c. 1894–1947), had moved to California from Massachusetts the previous year, purchasing a house on Scarff Street in downtown Los Angeles. Their son was his father's namesake, but was known in the household as Jack. The marriage broke down soon after Jack's birth, when Ruth discovered that her husband was sexually involved with a prostitute. Ruth filed for divorce in March 1915. Jack's father returned to Massachusetts after being exposed as an adulterer, with Ruth forbidding him from having any contact with his infant son. Marvel Parsons later joined the U.S. Armed Forces, reaching the rank of major, and married a woman with whom he had a son, Charles, a half-brother Jack only met once. Although she retained her ex-husband's surname, Ruth started calling her son John, but many friends throughout his life knew him as Jack.

Ruth's parents—Walter and Carrie Whiteside—moved to California to be with Jack and their daughter, purchasing an upscale house on Orange Grove Boulevard in Pasadena—known locally as "Millionaire's Mile"—where they could live together. Jack was surrounded by domestic servants. Having few friends, he lived a solitary childhood and spent much time reading; he took a particular interest in works of mythology, Arthurian legend, and the Arabian Nights. Through the works of Jules Verne he became interested in science fiction and a keen reader of pulp magazines like Amazing Stories, which led to his early interest in rocketry.

At age 12, Parsons began attending Washington Junior High School, where he performed poorly—which biographer George Pendle attributed to undiagnosed dyslexia—and was bullied for his upper-class status and perceived effeminacy. Although unpopular, he formed a strong friendship with Edward Forman, a boy from a poor working-class family who defended him from bullies and shared his interest in science fiction and rocketry. In 1928 the pair—adopting the Latin motto per aspera ad astra (through hardship to the stars)—began engaging in homemade gunpowder-based rocket experiments in the nearby Arroyo Seco canyon, as well as the Parsons family's back garden, which left it pockmarked with craters from explosive test failures. They incorporated commonly available fireworks such as cherry bombs into their rockets, and Parsons suggested using glue as a binding agent to increase the rocket fuel's stability. This research became more complex when they began using materials such as aluminium foil to make the gunpowder easier to cast. Parsons had also begun to investigate occultism, and performed a ritual intended to invoke the Devil into his bedroom; he worried that the invocation was successful and was frightened into ceasing these activities. In 1929, he began attending John Muir High School, where he maintained an insular friendship with Forman and was a keen participant in fencing and archery. After he received poor school results, Parsons's mother sent him away to study at the Brown Military Academy for Boys, a private boarding school in San Diego, but he was expelled for blowing up the toilets.

The Parsons family spent mid-1929 touring Europe before returning to Pasadena, where they moved into a house on San Rafael Avenue. With the onset of the Great Depression their fortune began to dwindle, and in July 1931 Jack's grandfather Walter died. Parsons began studying at the privately run University School, a liberal institution that took an unconventional approach to teaching. He flourished academically, becoming editor of the school newspaper, El Universitano, and winning an award for literary excellence; teachers who had trained at the nearby California Institute of Technology (Caltech) guided his attention to the study of chemistry. With the family's financial difficulties deepening, Parsons began working on weekends and school holidays at the Hercules Powder Company, where he learned more about explosives and their potential use in rocket propulsion. He and Forman continued to independently explore the subject in their spare time, building and testing different rockets, sometimes with materials that Parsons had stolen from work. Parsons soon constructed a solid-fuel rocket engine.

Parsons graduated from University School in 1933, and moved with his mother and grandmother to a more modest house on St. John Avenue, where he continued to pursue his interests in literature and poetry. He enrolled in Pasadena Junior College with the hope of earning an associate degree in physics and chemistry, but dropped out after one term because of his financial situation and took up permanent employment at the Hercules Powder Company. His employers then sent him to work at their manufacturing plant in Hercules, California on the San Francisco Bay, where he earned a relatively high monthly wage of $100; he was plagued by headaches caused by exposure to nitroglycerin. He saved money in hopes of continuing his academic studies and began a degree in chemistry at Stanford University, but found the tuition unaffordable and returned to Pasadena.

=== GALCIT Rocket Research Group and the Kynette trial: 1934–1938 ===
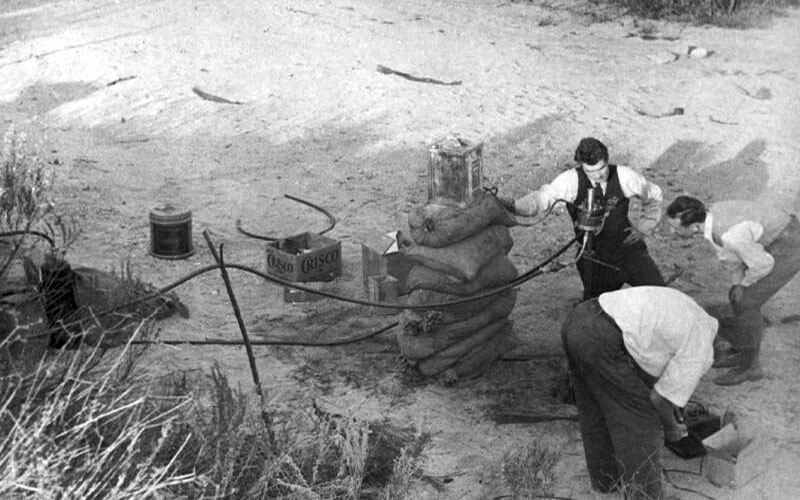
Parsons (dark vest) and GALCIT colleagues in the Arroyo Seco, Halloween 1936. JPL marks this experiment as its foundation.

In hopes of gaining access to the state-of-the-art resources of Caltech for their rocketry research, Parsons and Forman attended a lecture on the work of Austrian rocket engineer Eugen Sänger and hypothetical above-stratospheric aircraft by the institute's William Bollay—a PhD student specializing in rocket-powered aircraft—and approached him to express their interest in designing a liquid-fuel rocket motor. Bollay redirected them to another PhD student, Frank Malina, a mathematician and mechanical engineer writing a thesis on rocket propulsion who shared their interests and soon befriended them. Parsons, Forman, and Malina applied for funding from Caltech together; they did not mention that their ultimate objective was to develop rockets for space exploration, realizing that most of the scientific establishment then considered such ideas science fiction. Caltech's Clark Blanchard Millikan immediately rebuffed them, but Malina's doctoral advisor Theodore von Kármán saw more promise in their proposal and agreed to allow them to operate under the auspices of the university's Guggenheim Aeronautical Laboratory (GALCIT). Naming themselves the GALCIT Rocket Research Group, they gained access to Caltech's specialist equipment, though the economics of the Great Depression left von Kármán unable to finance them.

The trio focused their distinct skills on collaborative rocket development; Parsons was the chemist, Forman the machinist, and Malina the technical theoretician. Malina wrote in 1968 that the self-educated Parsons "lacked the discipline of a formal higher education, [but] had an uninhibited and fruitful imagination." Parsons and Forman who, as described by Geoffrey A. Landis, "were eager to try whatever idea happened to spring to mind", contrasted with Malina, who insisted on scientific discipline as informed by von Kármán. Landis writes that their creativity "kept Malina focused toward building actual rocket engines, not just solving equations on paper". Sharing socialist values, they operated on an egalitarian basis; Malina taught the others about scientific procedure and they taught him about the practical elements of rocketry. They often socialized, smoking marijuana and drinking, while Malina and Parsons set about writing a semiautobiographical science fiction screenplay they planned to pitch to Hollywood with strong anti-capitalist and pacifist themes.

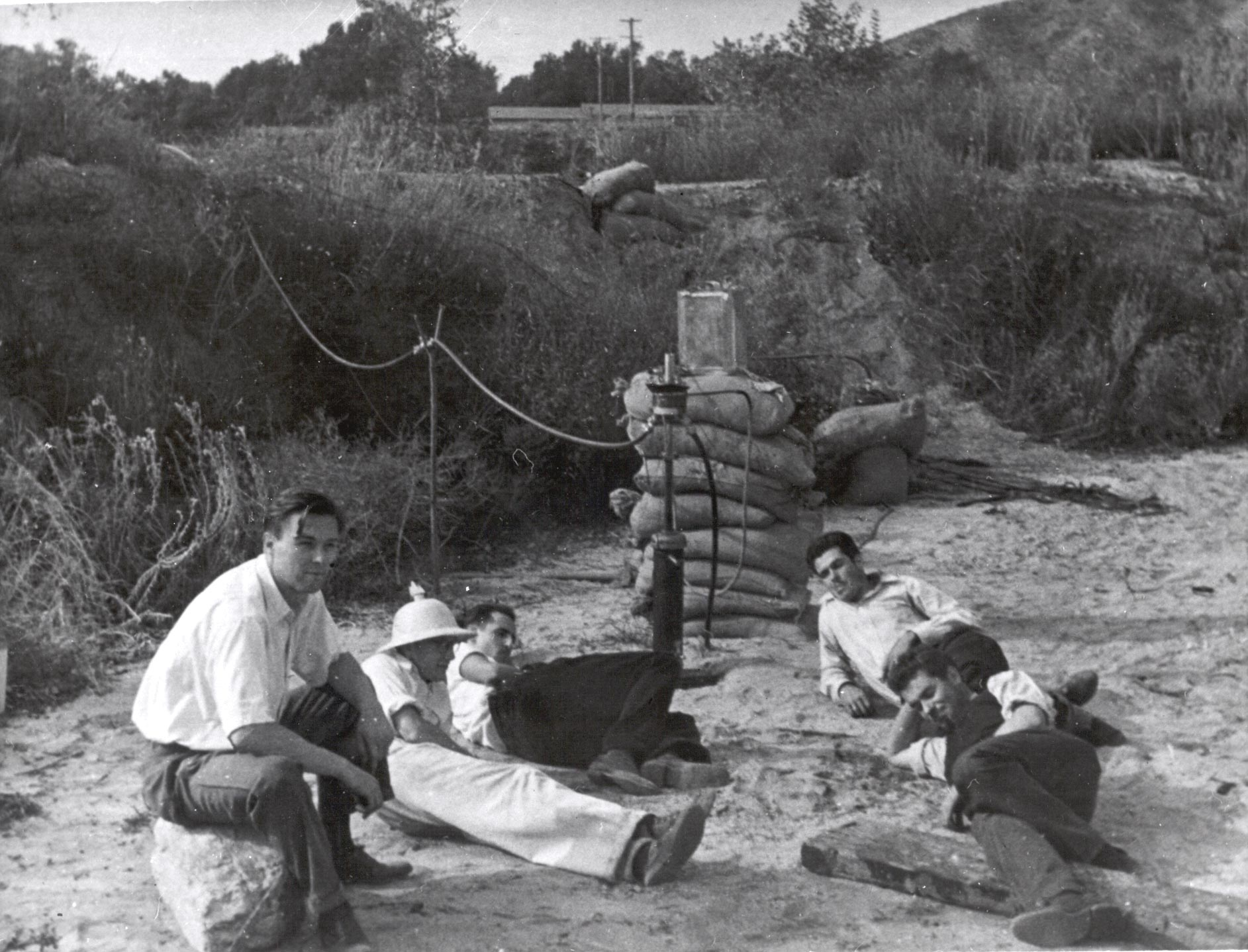
GALCIT Group members in the Arroyo Seco, November 1936. Left foreground to right: Rudolph Schott, Amo Smith, Frank Malina, Ed Forman, and Jack Parsons.

Parsons met Helen Northrup at a local church dance and proposed marriage in July 1934. She accepted and they were married in April 1935 at the Little Church of the Flowers in Forest Lawn Memorial Park, Glendale, before undertaking a brief honeymoon in San Diego. They moved into a house on South Terrace Drive, Pasadena, while Parsons got a job at the explosives manufacturer Halifax Powder Company's facility in Saugus. Much to Helen's dismay, Parsons spent most of his wages funding the GALCIT Rocket Research Group. For extra money, he manufactured nitroglycerin in their home, constructing a laboratory on their front porch. At one point, he pawned Helen's engagement ring, and he often asked her family for loans.

Malina recounted that "Parsons and Forman were not too pleased with an austere program that did not include at least the launching of model rockets", but the Group reached the consensus of developing a working static rocket motor before embarking on more complex research. They contacted liquid-fuel rocket pioneer Robert H. Goddard and he invited Malina to his facility in Roswell, New Mexico, but he was not interested in cooperating—reticent about sharing his research and having been subjected to widespread derision for his work in rocketry. They were instead joined by Caltech graduate students Apollo M. O. "Amo" Smith, Carlos C. Wood, Mark Muir Mills, Fred S. Miller, William C. Rockefeller, and Rudolph Schott; Schott's pickup truck transported their equipment. Their first liquid-fuel motor test took place near the Devil's Gate Dam in the Arroyo Seco on Halloween 1936. Parsons's biographer John Carter described the layout of the contraption as showing

oxygen flowing from one side, with methyl alcohol (the fuel) and nitrogen flowing from the other side. Water cooled the rocket during the burn. Thrust pulled down a spring which measured force. The deflection of the spring measured the force applied to it. A small diamond tip on the apparatus scratched a glass plate to mark the furthest point of deflection. The rocket and mount were protected by sandbags, with the tanks (and the experimenters) well away from it.

Three attempts to fire the rocket failed; on the fourth the oxygen line accidentally ignited and perilously billowed fire at the Group, but they viewed this experience as formative. They continued their experiments throughout the last quarter of 1936; after the final test was successfully completed in January 1937 von Kármán agreed that they could perform future experiments at an exclusive rocket testing facility on campus.

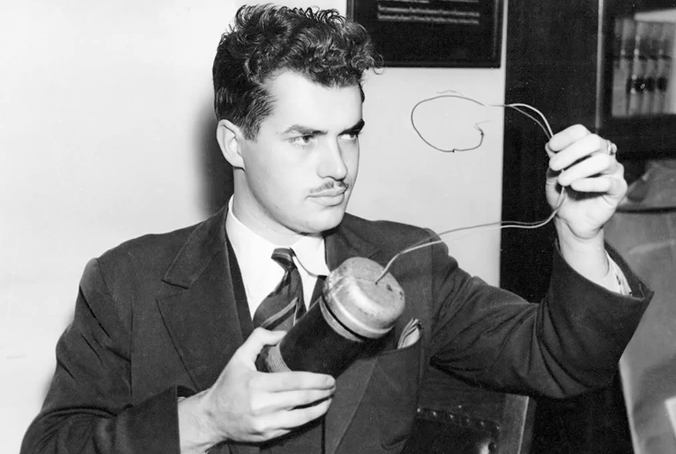
Parsons in 1938, holding the replica car bomb used in the murder trial of police officer Captain Earl Kynette

In April 1937, Caltech mathematician Qian Xuesen joined the Group. Several months later, Weld Arnold, a Caltech laboratory assistant who worked as the Group's official photographer, also joined. The main reason for Arnold's appointment to this position was his provision of a donation to the Group on behalf of an anonymous benefactor. They became well known on campus as the "Suicide Squad" for the dangerous nature of some of their experiments and attracted attention from the local press. Parsons himself gained further media publicity when he appeared as an expert explosives witness in the trial of Captain Earl Kynette, the head of police intelligence in Los Angeles who was accused of conspiring to set a car bomb in the attempted murder of private investigator Harry Raymond, a former LAPD detective who was fired after whistleblowing against police corruption. When Kynette was convicted largely on Parsons' testimony, which included his forensic reconstruction of the car bomb and its explosion, his identity as an expert scientist in the public eye was established despite his lack of a university education. While working at Caltech, Parsons was admitted to evening courses in chemistry at the University of Southern California (USC), but distracted by his GALCIT workload he attended sporadically and received unexceptional grades.

By early 1938, the Group had made their static rocket motor, which originally burned for three seconds, run for over a minute. In May that year, Parsons was invited by Forrest J Ackerman to lecture on his rocketry work at Chapter Number 4 of the Los Angeles Science Fiction League (LASFL). Although he never joined the society, he occasionally attended their talks, on one occasion conversing with a teenage Ray Bradbury. Another scientist to become involved in the GALCIT project was Sidney Weinbaum, a Jewish refugee from Europe who was a vocal Marxist; he led Parsons, Malina, and Qian in their creation of a largely secretive communist discussion group at Caltech, which became known as Professional Unit 122 of the Pasadena Communist Party. Although Parsons subscribed to the People's Daily World and joined the American Civil Liberties Union (ACLU), he refused to join the American Communist Party, causing a break in his and Weinbaum's friendship. This, coupled with the need to focus on paid employment, led to the disintegration of much of the Rocket Research Group, leaving only its three founding members by late 1938.

=== Embracing Thelema; advancing JATO and foundation of Aerojet: 1939–1942 ===
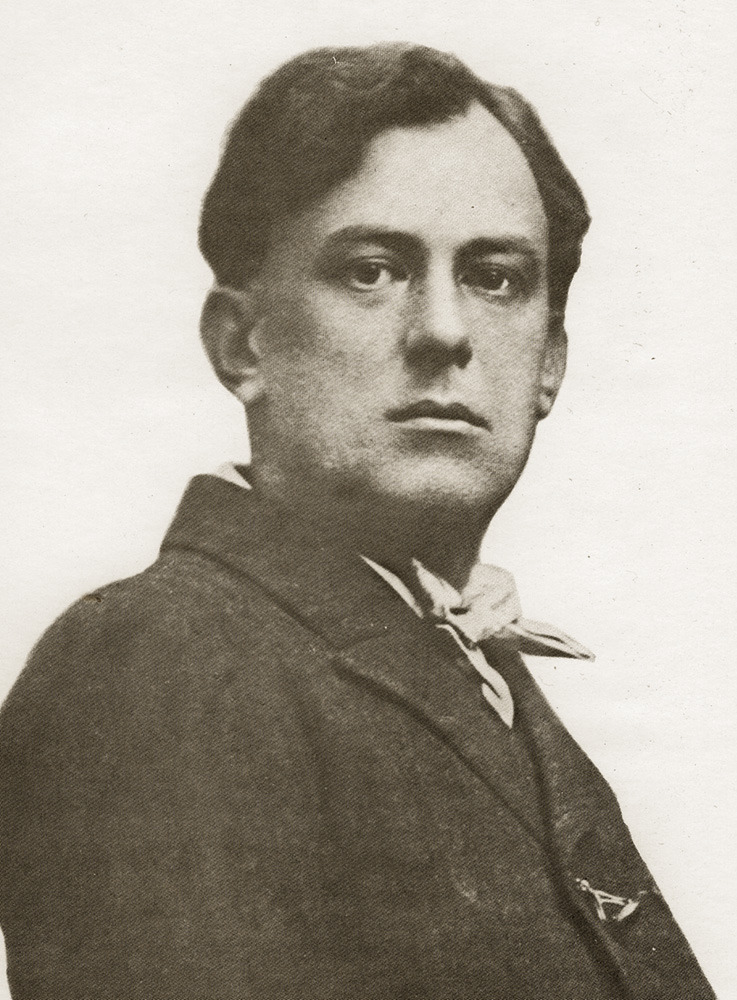
Aleister Crowley (pictured in 1912), founder of Thelema, was Parsons' spiritual mentor.

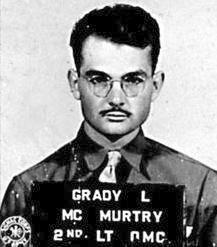
Grady McMurtry was recruited into O.T.O. by Parsons.

In January 1939, John and Frances Baxter, a brother and sister who had befriended Jack and Helen Parsons, took Jack to the Church of Thelema on Winona Boulevard, Hollywood, where he witnessed the performance of The Gnostic Mass. Celebrants of the church had included Hollywood actor John Carradine and future NAMBLA activist Harry Hay. Parsons was intrigued, having already heard of Thelema's founder and Outer Head of Ordo Templi Orientis (O.T.O.), Aleister Crowley, after reading a copy of Crowley's text Konx om Pax (1907).

Parsons was introduced to leading members Regina Kahl, Jane Wolfe, and Wilfred Talbot Smith at the mass. Feeling both "repulsion and attraction" for Smith, Parsons continued to sporadically attend the Church's events for a year. He continued to read Crowley's works, which increasingly interested him, and encouraged Helen to read them. Parsons came to believe in the reality of Thelemic magick as a force that could be explained through quantum physics. He tried to interest his friends and acquaintances in Thelema, taking science fiction writers Jack Williamson and Cleve Cartmill to a performance of The Gnostic Mass. Although they were unimpressed, Parsons was more successful with Grady Louis McMurtry, a young Caltech student he had befriended, as well as McMurtry's fiancée Claire Palmer, and Helen's sister Sara "Betty" Northrup.

Jack and Helen were initiated into the Agape Lodge, the renamed Church of Thelema, in February 1941. Parsons adopted the Thelemic motto of Thelema Obtenteum Proedero Amoris Nuptiae, a Latin mistranslation of "The establishment of Thelema through the rituals of love". The initials of this motto spelled out T.O.P.A.N., also serving as the declaration "To Pan". Commenting on Parsons' errors of translation, in jest Crowley said that "the motto which you mention is couched in a language beyond my powers of understanding". Parsons also adopted the Thelemic title Frater T.O.P.A.N—with T.O.P.A.N represented in Kabbalistic numerology as 210—the name with which he frequently signed letters to occult associates—while Helen became known as Soror Grimaud. Smith wrote to Crowley saying that Parsons was "a really excellent man ... He has an excellent mind and much better intellect than myself ... JP is going to be very valuable". Wolfe wrote to German O.T.O. representative Karl Germer that Parsons was "an A1 man ... Crowleyesque in attainment as a matter of fact", and mooted Parsons as a potential successor to Crowley as Outer Head of the Order. Crowley concurred with such assessments, informing Smith that Parsons "is the most valued member of the whole Order, with no exception!"

At von Kármán's suggestion, Frank Malina approached the National Academy of Sciences (NAS) Committee on Army Air Corps Research to request funding for research into what they referred to as "jet propulsion", a term chosen to avoid the stigma attached to rocketry. The military were interested in jet propulsion as a means of getting aircraft quickly airborne where there was insufficient room for a full-length runway, and gave the Rocket Research Group $1,000 to put together a proposal on the feasibility of Jet-Assisted Take Off (JATO) by June 1939, making Parsons et al. the first U.S. government-sanctioned rocket research group. Since their formation in 1934, they had also performed experiments involving model, black powder motor-propelled multistage rockets. In a research paper submitted to the American Institute of Aeronautics and Astronautics (AIAA), Parsons reported these rockets reaching exhaust velocities of 4,875 miles per hour, thereby demonstrating the potential of solid fuels to be more effective than the liquid types primarily preferred by researchers such as Goddard. In light of this progress, Caltech and the GALCIT Group received an additional $10,000 rocketry research grant from the AIAA.

Although a quarter of their funding went to repairing damage to Caltech buildings caused by their experiments, in June 1940 they submitted a report to the NAS in which they showed the feasibility of the project for the development of JATO and requested $100,000 to continue; they received $22,000. Now known as GALCIT Project Number 1, they continued to be ostracized by other Caltech scientists who grew increasingly irritated by their accidents and noise pollution, and were forced to relocate their experiments back to the Arroyo Seco, at a site with unventilated, corrugated iron sheds that served as both research facilities and administrative offices. It was here that JPL would be founded. Parsons and Forman's rocket experiments were the cover story of the August 1940 edition of Popular Mechanics, in which the pair discussed the prospect of rockets being able to ascend above Earth's atmosphere and orbit around it for research purposes, as well as reaching the Moon.

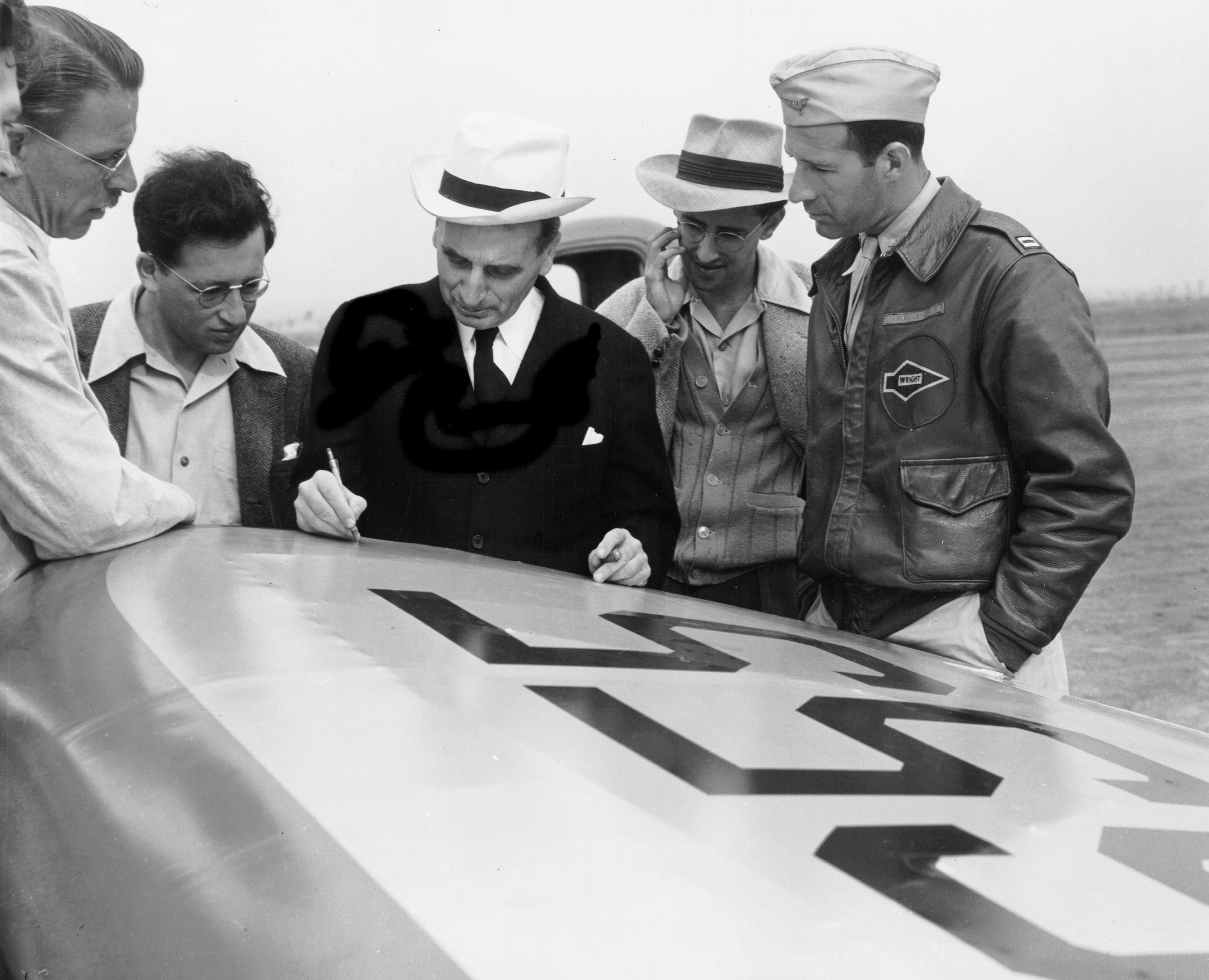
The GALCIT JATO engineering team during the solid propellant tests in January 1940. Parsons is visible cropped out on the extreme left alongside Clark Blanchard Millikan, Martin Summerfield, Theodore von Kármán, Frank Malina and pilot, Captain Homer Boushey.

For the JATO project, they were joined by Caltech mathematician Martin Summerfield and 18 workers supplied by the Works Progress Administration. Former colleagues like Qian were prevented from returning to the project by the Federal Bureau of Investigation (FBI), who ensured the secrecy of the operation and restricted the involvement of foreign nationals and political extremists. The FBI was satisfied that Parsons was not a Marxist but were concerned when Thelemite friend Paul Seckler used Parsons' gun in a drunken car hijacking, for which Seckler was imprisoned in San Quentin State Prison for two years. Englishman George Emerson replaced Arnold as the Group's official photographer.

The Group's aim was to find a replacement for black-powder rocket motors—units consisting of charcoal, sulfur and potassium nitrate with a binding agent. The mixture was unstable and there were frequent explosions damaging military aircraft. The solid JATO fuel invented by Parsons consisted of amide, corn starch, and ammonium nitrate bound together in the JATO unit with glue and blotting paper. It was codenamed GALCIT-27, implying the previous invention of 26 new fuels. The first JATO tests using an ERCO Ercoupe plane took place in late July 1941; though they aided propulsion, the units frequently exploded and damaged the aircraft. Parsons theorized that this was because the ammonium nitrate became dangerously combustible following overnight storage, during which temperature and consistency changes had resulted in a chemical imbalance. Parsons and Malina accordingly devised a method in which they would fill the JATOs with the fuel in the early mornings shortly before the tests, enduring sleep deprivation to do so. On August 21, 1941, Navy Captain Homer J. Boushey, Jr.—watched by Clark Millikan and William F. Durand—piloted the JATO-equipped Ercoupe at March Air Force Base in Moreno Valley, California. It proved a success and reduced takeoff distance by 30%, but one of the JATOs partially exploded. Over the following weeks 62 further tests took place, and the NAS increased their grant to $125,000. During a series of static experiments, an exploding JATO did significant damage to the rear fuselage of an Ercoupe; one observer optimistically noted that "at least it wasn't a big hole", but necessary repairs delayed their efforts.

The military ordered a flight test using liquid rather than solid fuel in early 1942. Upon the United States' entry into the Second World War in December 1941, the Group realized they could be drafted directly into military service if they failed to provide viable JATO technology for the military. Informed by their left-wing politics, aiding the war effort against Nazi Germany and the Axis powers was as much of a moral vocation to Parsons, Forman and Malina as it was a practical one. Parsons, Summerfield and the GALCIT workers focused on the task and found success with a combination of gasoline with red fuming nitric acid as its oxidizer; the latter, suggested by Parsons, was an effective substitute for liquid oxygen. The testing of this fuel resulted in another calamity, when the testing rocket motor exploded; the fire, containing iron shed fragments and shrapnel, inexplicably left the experimenters unscathed. Malina solved the problem by replacing the gasoline with aniline, resulting in a successful test launch of a JATO-equipped A-20A plane at the Muroc Auxiliary Air Field in the Mojave Desert. It provided five times more thrust than GALCIT-27, and again reduced takeoff distance by 30%; Malina wrote to his parents that "We now have something that really works and we should be able to help give the Fascists hell!"

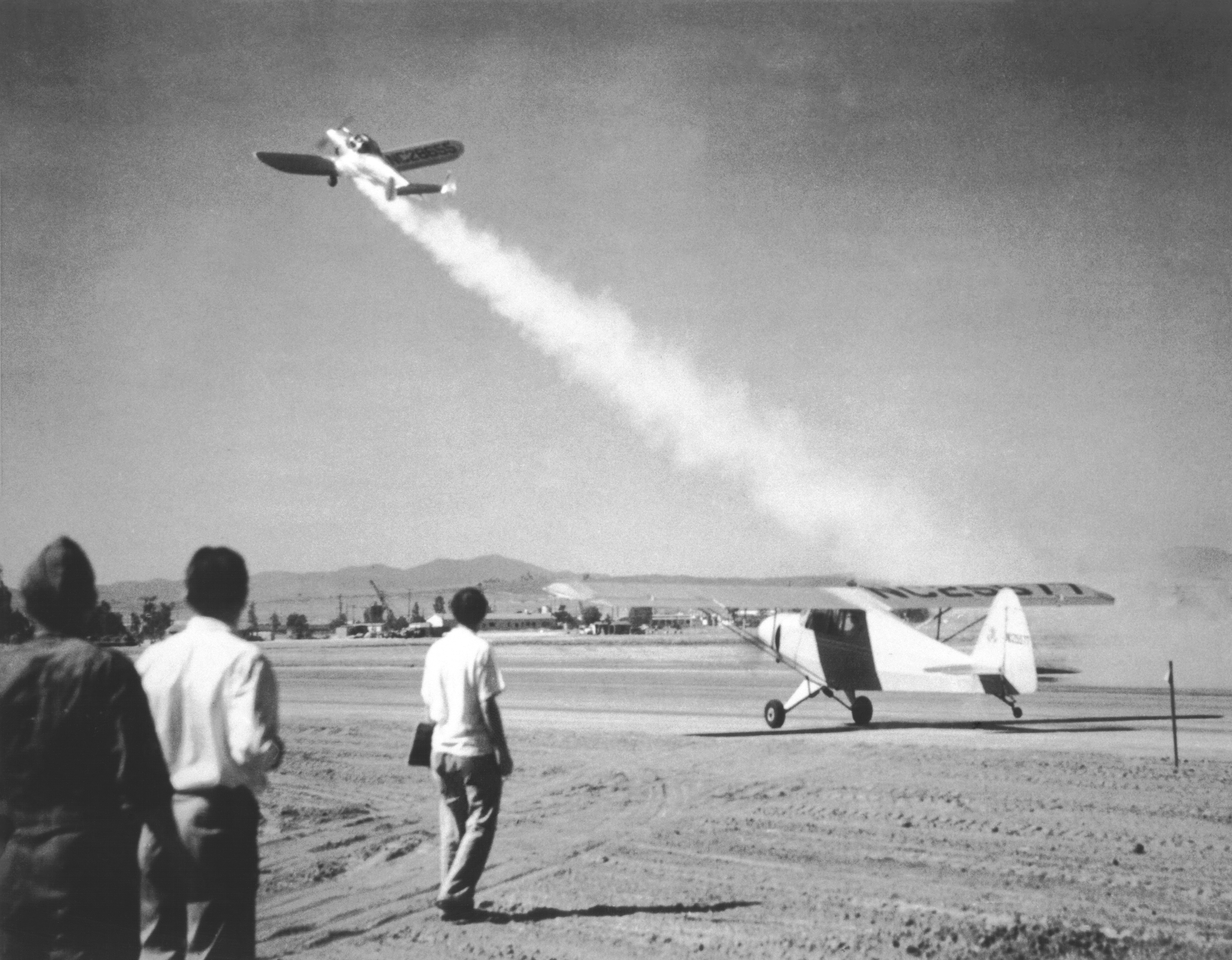
Take-off on August 12, 1941, of America's first "rocket-assisted" fixed-wing aircraft, an ERCO Ercoupe fitted with a GALCIT developed solid propellant JATO booster

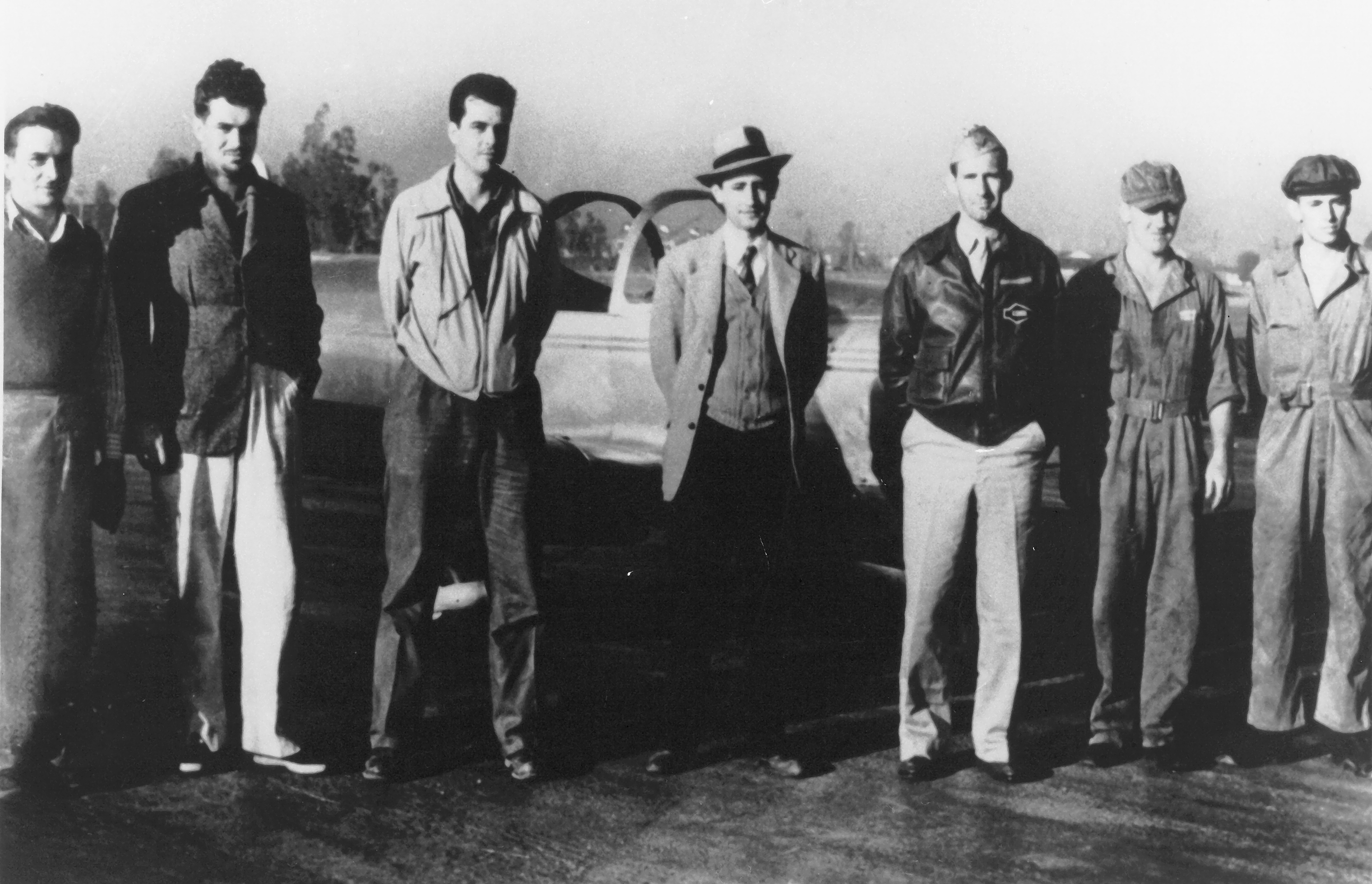
GALCIT Project Number 1 during the JATO experiments (date as above). From left to right: Fred S. Miller, Jack Parsons, Ed Forman, Frank Malina, Captain Homer Boushey, Private Kobe (first initial unknown), and Corporal R. Hamilton.

The Group then agreed to produce and sell 60 JATO engines to the United States Army Air Corps. To do so they formed the Aerojet Engineering Corporation in March 1942, in which Parsons, Forman, Malina, von Kármán, and Summerfield each invested $250, opening their offices on Colorado Boulevard and bringing in Amo Smith as their engineer. Andrew G. Haley was recruited by von Kármán as their lawyer and treasurer. Although Aerojet was a for-profit operation that provided technology for military means, the founders' mentality was rooted in the ideal of using rockets for peaceful space exploration. As Haley recounted von Kármán requesting: "we will make the rockets—you must make the corporation and obtain the money. Later on you will have to see that we all behave well in outer space."

Despite these successes, Parsons, the project engineer of Aerojet's Solid Fuel Department, remained motivated to address the malfunctions observed during the Ercoupe tests. In June 1942, assisted by Mills and Miller, he focused his attention on developing an effective method of restricted burning when using solid rocket fuel, as the military demanded JATOs that could provide over 100 pounds of thrust without any risk of exploding. Although solid fuels such as GALCIT-27 were more storable than their liquid counterparts, they were disfavored for military JATO use as they provided less immediate thrust and did not have the versatility of being turned on and off mid-flight. Parsons tried to resolve GALCIT-27's stability issue with GALCIT-46, which replaced the former's ammonium nitrate with guanidine nitrate. To avoid the problems seen with ammonium nitrate, he had GALCIT-46 cooled and then heated prior to testing. When it failed the test, he realized that the fuel's binding black powders rather than the oxidizers had resulted in their instability, and in June that year had the idea of using liquid asphalt as an appropriate binding agent with potassium perchlorate as oxidizer.

Malina recounted that Parsons was inspired to use asphalt by the ancient incendiary weapon Greek fire; in a 1982 talk for the International Association of Astronomical Artists Captain Boushey stated that Parsons experienced an epiphany after watching workers using molten asphalt to fix tiles onto a roof. Known as GALCIT-53, this fuel proved to be significantly more stable than the Group's earlier concoctions, fulfilling Parsons' aim of creating a restricted-burn rocket fuel inside a castable container, and providing a thrust 427% more powerful than that of GALCIT-27. This set a precedent which according to his biographer John Carter "changed the future of rocket technology": the thermoplastic asphalt casting was durable in all climates, allowing for mass production and indefinite storage and transforming solid-fuel agents into a safe and viable form of rocket propulsion. Plasticized variants of Parsons' solid-fuel design invented by JPL's Charles Bartley were later used by NASA in Space Shuttle Solid Rocket Boosters and by the Strategic Air Command in Polaris, Poseidon and Minuteman intercontinental ballistic missiles.

=== Foundation of JPL and leading the Agape Lodge: 1942–1944 ===
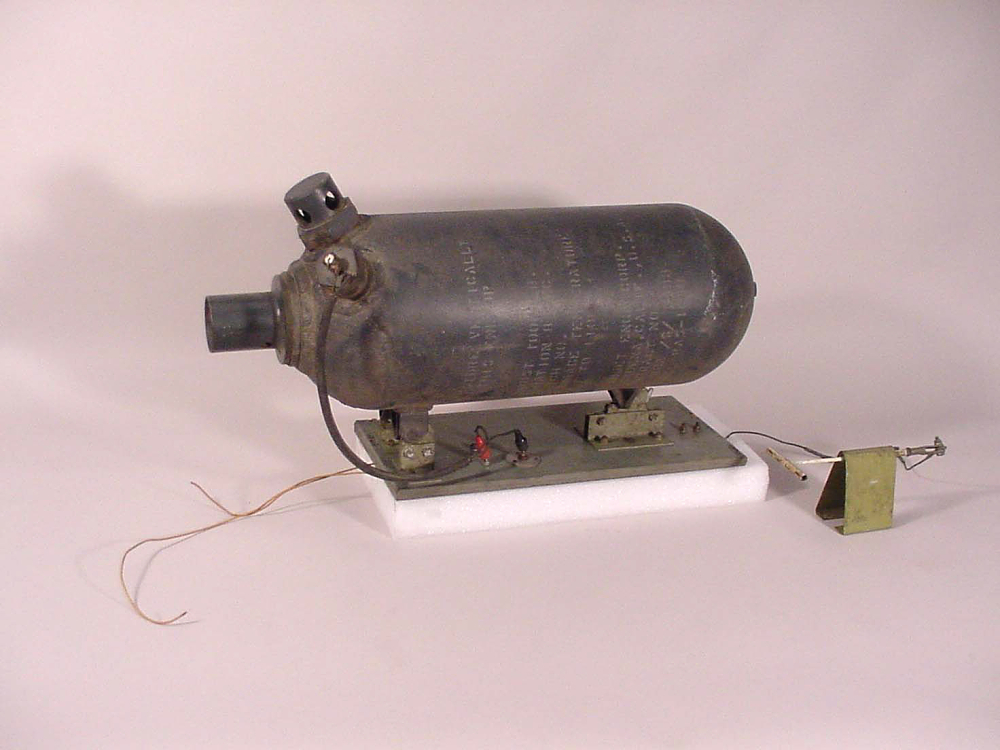
Solid-fuel JATO unit manufactured by Aerojet at the National Air and Space Museum

Aerojet's first two contracts were from the U.S. Navy; the Bureau of Aeronautics requested a solid-fuel JATO and Wilbur Wright Field requested a liquid-fuel unit. The Air Corps had requested two thousand JATOs from Aerojet by late 1943, committing $256,000 toward Parsons' solid-fuel type. Despite this drastically increased turnover, the company continued to operate informally and remained intertwined with the GALCIT project. Caltech astronomer Fritz Zwicky was brought in as head of the company's research department. Haley replaced von Kármán as Aerojet chairman and imposed payroll cuts instead of reducing JATO output; the alternative was to cut staff numbers while maintaining more generous salaries, but Haley's priority was Aerojet's contribution to the war effort. Company heads including Parsons were exempted from this austerity, drawing the ire of many personnel.

Parsons' newfound credentials and financial security gave him the opportunity to travel more widely throughout the U.S. as an ambassador for Aerojet, meeting with other rocket enthusiasts. In New York he met with Karl Germer, the head of O.T.O. in North America and in Washington, D.C. he met Poet Laureate Joseph Auslander, donating some of Crowley's poetry books to the Library of Congress. He also became a regular at the Mañana Literary Society, which met in Laurel Canyon at the home of Parsons' friend Robert A. Heinlein and included science fiction writers including Cleve Cartmill, Jack Williamson, and Anthony Boucher. Among Parsons' favorite works of fiction was Williamson's Darker Than You Think, a novelette published in the fantasy magazine Unknown in 1940, which inspired his later occult workings. Boucher used Parsons as a partial basis for the character of Hugo Chantrelle in his murder mystery Rocket to the Morgue (1942).

Helen went away for a period in June 1941, during which Parsons, encouraged to do so by the sexually permissive attitude of O.T.O., began a sexual relationship with her 17-year-old sister, Sara. Upon Helen's return, Sara asserted that she was Parsons' new wife, and Parsons himself admitted that he found Sara more sexually attractive than Helen. Conflicted in her feelings, Helen sought comfort in Wilfred Talbot Smith and began a relationship with him that lasted for the rest of his life; the four remained friends. The two couples, along with a number of other Thelemites (some of whom with their children), moved to 1003 South Orange Grove Boulevard, an American Craftsman-style mansion. They all contributed to the rent of $100 a month and lived communally in what replaced Winona Boulevard as the new base of the Agape Lodge, maintaining an allotment and slaughtering their own livestock for meat as well as blood rituals. Parsons decorated his new room with a copy of the Stele of Revealing, a statue of Pan, and his collection of swords and daggers. He converted the garage and laundry room into a chemical laboratory and often held science fiction discussion meetings in the kitchen, and entertained the children with hunts for fairies in the 25-acre garden.

I hight Don Quixote, I live on Peyote,
marihuana, morphine and cocaine.
I never knew sadness but only a madness
that burns at the heart and brain,

— Excerpt from an untitled poem published in Parsons' ill-fated Oriflamme journal

Although there were arguments among the commune members, Parsons remained dedicated to Thelema. He gave almost all of his salary to O.T.O. while actively seeking out new members—recruiting JPL mathematician Barbara Canright—and financially supported Crowley in London through Germer. Parsons' enthusiasm for the Lodge quickly began to impact on his professional life. He frequently appeared at Aerojet hungover and sleep-deprived from late nights of Lodge activities, and invited many of his colleagues to them, drawing the ire of staff who previously tolerated Parsons' occultism as harmless eccentricity; known to von Kármán as a "delightful screwball", he was frequently observed reciting Crowley's poem "Hymn to Pan" in an ecstatic manner compared to the preaching of Billy Graham during rocket tests—and on request at parties to their great amusement. They disapproved of his hesitancy to separate his vocations; Parsons became more rigorously engaged in Aerojet's day-to-day business in an effort to resolve this wariness, but the Agape Lodge soon came under investigation by both the Pasadena Police Department and the FBI. Both had received allegations of a "black magic cult" involved in sexual orgies; one complainant was a 16-year-old boy who said that he was raped by lodge members, while neighbors reported a ritual involving a naked pregnant woman jumping through fire. After Parsons explained that the Lodge was simply "an organization dedicated to religious and philosophical speculation", neither agency found evidence of illegal activity and came to the conclusion that the Lodge constituted no threat to national security. Having been a long-term heavy user of alcohol and marijuana, Parsons now habitually used cocaine, amphetamines, peyote, mescaline, and opiates as well. He continued to have sexual relations with multiple women, including McMurtry's fiancée Claire. When Parsons paid for her to have an abortion, McMurtry was angered and their friendship broke down.

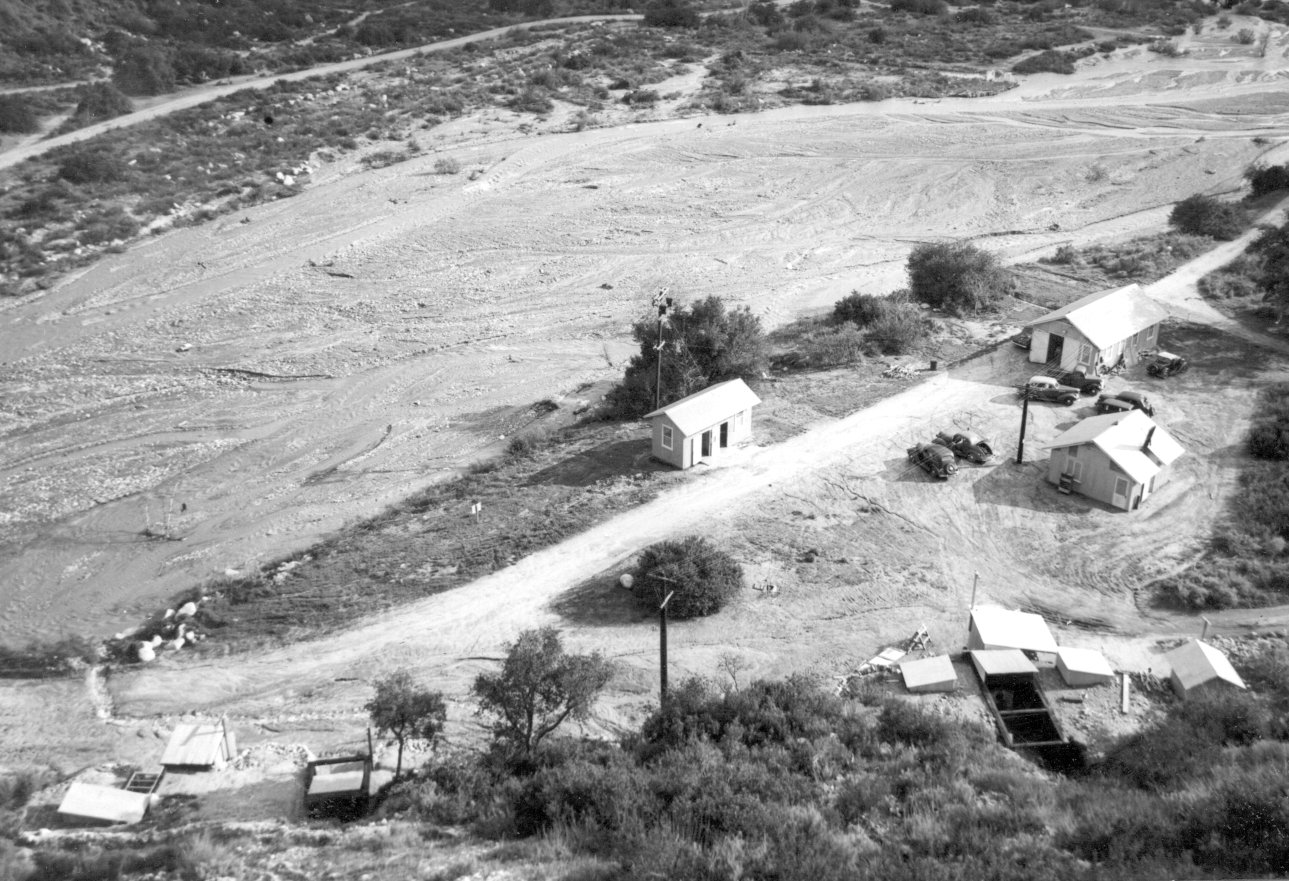
The JPL Arroyo Seco site in February 1942

Crowley and Germer wanted to see Smith removed as head of the Agape Lodge, believing that he had become a bad influence on its members. Parsons and Helen wrote to them to defend their mentor but Germer ordered him to stand down; Parsons was appointed as temporary head of the Lodge. Some veteran Lodge members disliked Parsons' influence, concerned that it encouraged excessive sexual polyandry that was religiously detrimental, but his charismatic orations at Lodge meetings assured his popularity among the majority of followers. Parsons soon created the Thelemite journal Oriflamme, in which he published his own poetry, but Crowley was unimpressed—particularly due to Parsons' descriptions of drug use—and the project was soon shelved. Helen gave birth to Smith's son in April; the child was named Kwen Lanval Parsons. Smith and Helen left with Kwen for a two-room cabin in Rainbow Valley in May. Concurrently in England, Crowley undertook an astrological analysis of Smith's birth chart and came to the conclusion that Smith was the incarnation of a god, greatly altering his estimation of him. Smith remained skeptical as Crowley's analysis was seemingly deliberately devised in Parsons' favor, encouraging Smith to step down from his role in the Agape Lodge and instructing him to take a meditative retreat. Refusing to take orders from Germer any more, Smith resigned from O.T.O. Parsons—who remained sympathetic and friendly to Smith during the conflict and was weary of Crowley's "appalling egotism, bad taste, bad judgement, and pedanticism"—ceased lodge activities and resigned as its head, but withdrew his resignation after receiving a pacifying letter from Crowley.

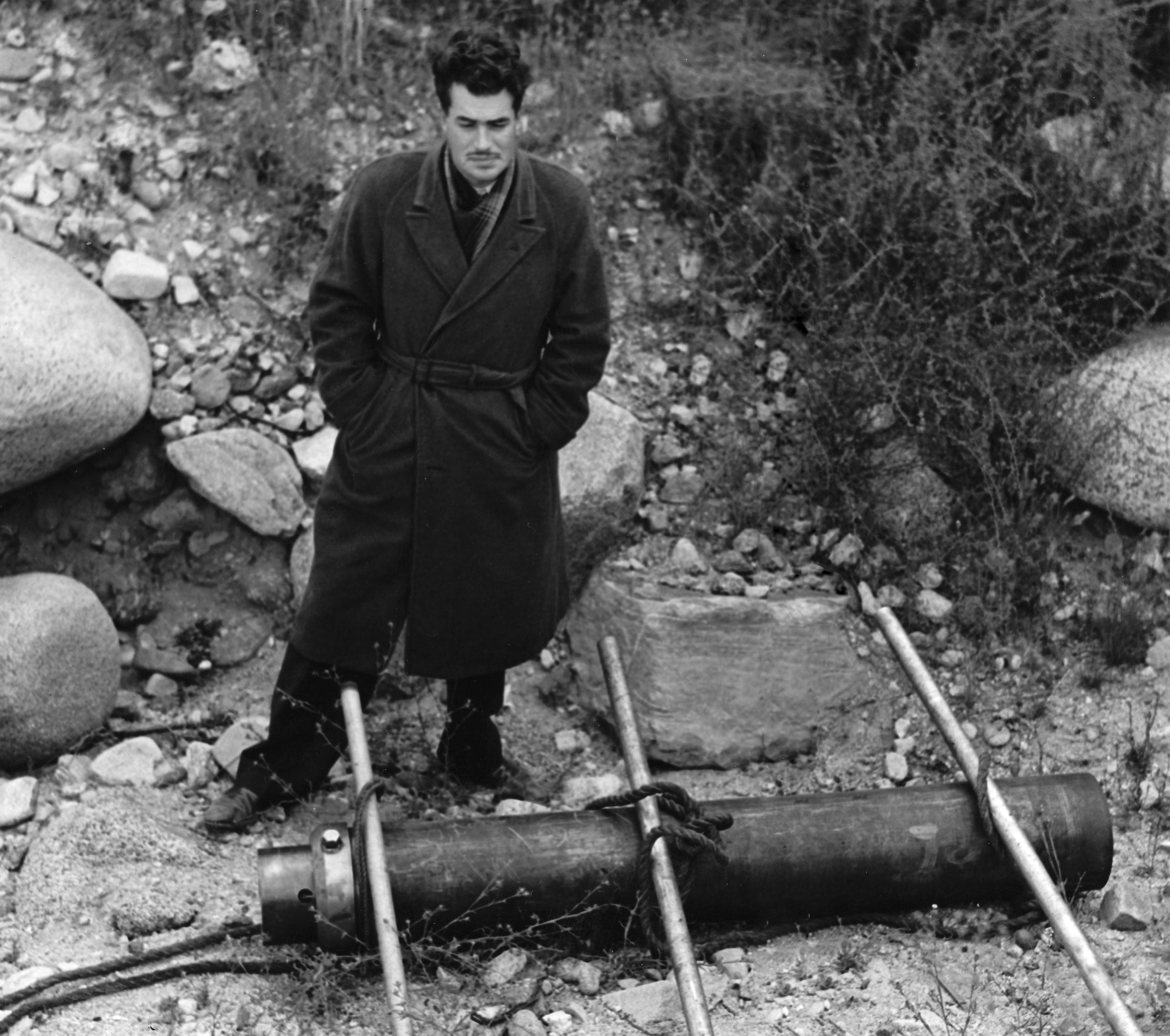
Parsons standing above a JATO canister at JPL June 1943

By mid-1943, Aerojet was operating on a budget of $650,000. The same year Parsons and von Kármán traveled to Norfolk, Virginia on the invitation of Secretary of the Navy Frank Knox to consult on a new JATO contract for the U.S. Navy. Though JATOs were being mass-produced for military applications, JATO-propelled aircraft could not "keep up" with larger, bomber planes taking off from long aircraft carrier runways—which made Aerojet's industry at risk of becoming defunct. Parsons demonstrated the efficacy of the newer JATOs to solve this issue by equipping a Grumman plane with solid-fuel units; its assisted takeoff from the USS Charger was successful, but produced smoke containing a noxious, yellow-colored residue. The Navy guaranteed Parsons a contract on the condition that this residue was removed; this led to the invention of Aeroplex, a technology for smokeless vapor trails developed at Aerojet by Parsons.

As the U.S. became aware that Nazi Germany had developed the V-2 rocket, the military—following recommendations from von Kármán based upon research using British intelligence—placed a renewed impetus on its own rocket research, reinstating Qian to the GALCIT project. They gave the Group a $3 million grant to develop rocket-based weapons, and the Group was expanded and renamed the Jet Propulsion Laboratory (JPL). By this point the Navy were ordering 20,000 JATOs a month from Aerojet, and in December 1944 Haley negotiated for the company to sell 51% of its stock to the General Tire and Rubber Company to cope with the increased demand. Aerojet's Caltech-linked employees—including Zwicky, Malina and Summerfield—would only agree to the sale on the condition that Parsons and Forman were removed from the company, viewing their occult activities as disreputable. JPL historian Erik M. Conway also attributes Parsons' expulsion to more practical concerns: he "still wanted to work in the same way as he'd done in his backyard, instinctive and without regard for safety". Parsons and Forman were unfazed, informing Haley of their prediction that the rocket industry would become obsolete in the postwar age and seeing more financial incentive in starting a chain of laundromats. Haley persuaded them to sell their stock, resulting in Parsons leaving the company with $11,000. With this money he bought the lease to 1003, which had come to be known as "the Parsonage" after him.

=== L. Ron Hubbard and the Babalon Working: 1945–1946 ===
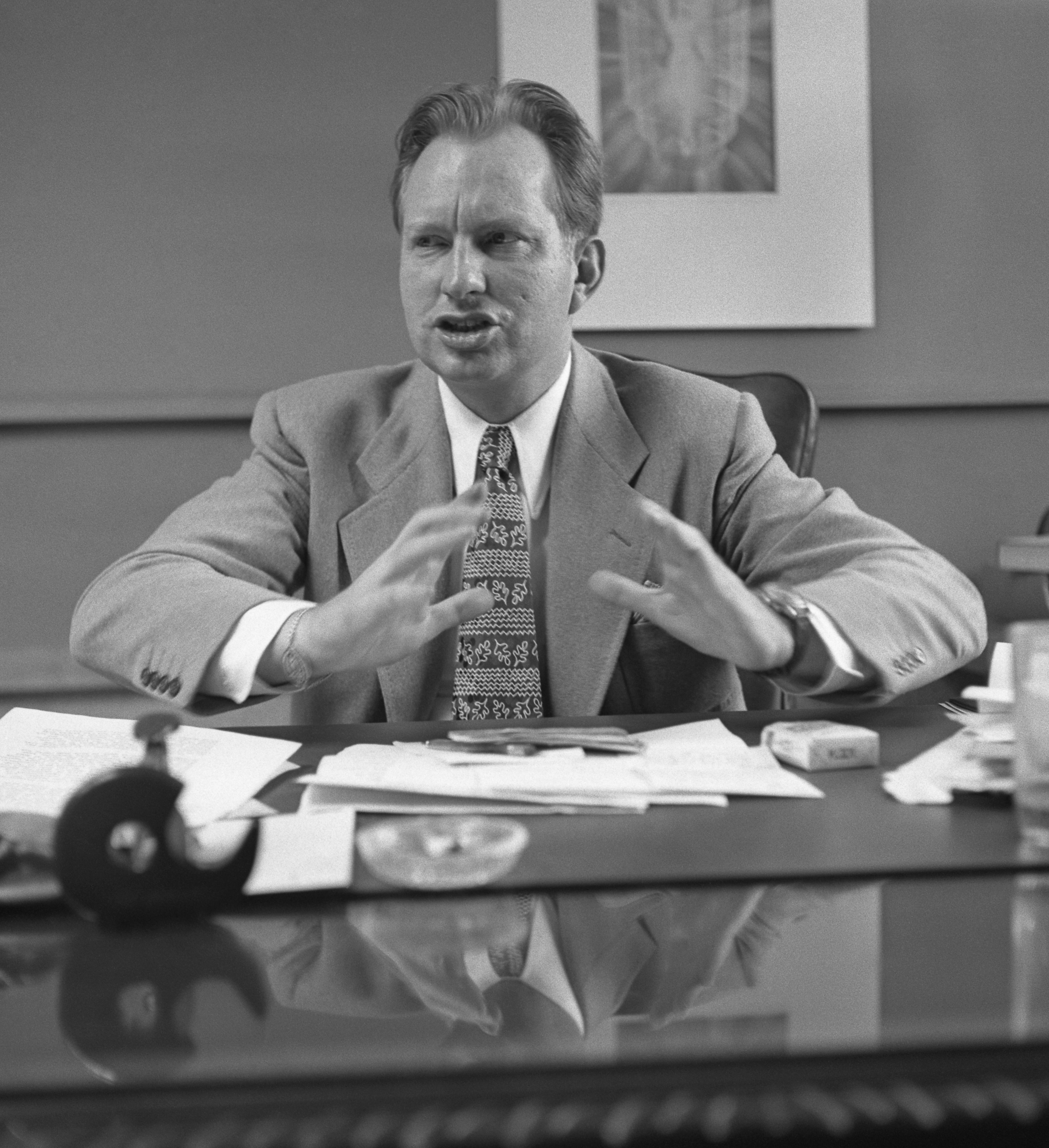
Parsons befriended L. Ron Hubbard.

Now disassociated from JPL and Aerojet, Parsons and Forman founded the Ad Astra Engineering Company, under which Parsons founded the chemical manufacturing Vulcan Powder Company. Ad Astra was subject to an FBI investigation under suspicion of espionage when security agents from the Manhattan Project discovered that Parsons and Forman had procured a chemical used in a top secret project for a material known only as x-metal, but they were later acquitted of any wrongdoing.

Parsons continued to financially support Smith and Helen, although he asked for a divorce from her and ignored Crowley's commands by welcoming Smith back to the Parsonage when his retreat was finished. Parsons continued to hold O.T.O. activities at the Parsonage but began renting rooms at the house to non-Thelemites, including journalist Nieson Himmel, Manhattan Project physicist Robert Cornog, and science fiction artist Louis Goldstone. Parsons attracted controversy in Pasadena for his preferred clientele. As Parsonage resident Alva Rogers recalled: "In the ads placed in the local paper Jack specified that only bohemians, artists, musicians, atheists, anarchists, or any other exotic types need to apply for rooms—any mundane soul would be unceremoniously rejected".

Science fiction writer and U.S. Navy officer L. Ron Hubbard soon moved into the Parsonage; he and Parsons became close friends. Parsons wrote to Crowley that although Hubbard had "no formal training in Magick he has an extraordinary amount of experience and understanding in the field. From some of his experiences I deduce he is in direct touch with some higher intelligence, possibly his Guardian Angel. ... He is the most Thelemic person I have ever met and is in complete accord with our own principles."

Parsons and Sara were in an open relationship encouraged by O.T.O.'s polyamorous sexual ethics, and she became enamored with Hubbard; Parsons, despite attempting to repress his passions, became intensely jealous. Motivated to find a new partner through occult means, Parsons began to devote his energies to conducting black magic, causing concern among fellow O.T.O. members who believed that he was invoking troublesome spirits into the Parsonage; Jane Wolfe wrote to Crowley that "our own Jack is enamored with Witchcraft, the houmfort, voodoo. From the start he always wanted to evoke something—no matter what, I am inclined to think, as long as he got a result." He told the residents that he was imbuing statues in the house with a magical energy in order to sell them to fellow occultists.

Parsons reported paranormal events in the house resulting from the rituals; including poltergeist activity, sightings of orbs and ghostly apparitions, alchemical (sylphic) effect on the weather, and disembodied voices. Pendle suggested that Parsons was particularly susceptible to these interpretations and attributed the voices to a prank by Hubbard and Sara. One ritual allegedly brought screaming banshees to the windows of the Parsonage, an incident that disturbed Forman for the rest of his life. In December 1945, Parsons began a series of rituals based on Enochian magic during which he masturbated onto magical tablets, accompanied by Sergei Prokofiev's Second Violin Concerto. Describing this magical operation as the Babalon Working, he hoped to bring about the incarnation of Thelemite goddess Babalon onto Earth. He allowed Hubbard to take part as his "scribe", believing that he was particularly sensitive to detecting magical phenomena. As described by Richard Metzger, "Parsons jerked off in the name of spiritual advancement" while Hubbard "scanned the astral plane for signs and visions."

Their final ritual took place in the Mojave Desert in late February 1946, during which Parsons abruptly decided that his undertaking was complete. On returning to the Parsonage, he discovered that Marjorie Cameron—an unemployed illustrator and former Navy WAVE—had come to visit. Believing her to be the "elemental" woman and manifestation of Babalon that he had invoked, in early March Parsons began performing sex magic rituals with Cameron, who acted as his "Scarlet Woman", while Hubbard continued to participate as the amanuensis. Unlike the rest of the household, Cameron knew nothing at first of Parsons' magical intentions: "I didn't know anything about O.T.O., I didn't know that they had invoked me, I didn't know anything, but the whole house knew it. Everybody was watching to see what was going on." Despite this ignorance and her skepticism about Parsons' magic, Cameron reported her sighting of a UFO to Parsons, who secretly recorded the sighting as a materialization of Babalon.

Inspired by Crowley's novel Moonchild (1917), Parsons and Hubbard aimed to magically fertilize a "magical child" through Immaculate Conception, which when born to a woman somewhere on Earth nine months following the working's completion would become the Thelemic messiah embodying Babalon. To quote Metzger, the purpose of the Babalon Working was "a daring attempt to shatter the boundaries of space and time" facilitating, according to Parsons, the emergence of Thelema's Æon of Horus. When Cameron departed for a trip to New York, Parsons retreated to the desert, where he believed that a preternatural entity psychographically provided him with Liber 49, which represented a fourth part of Crowley's The Book of the Law, the primary sacred text of Thelema, as well as part of a new sacred text he called the Book of Babalon. Crowley was bewildered and concerned by the endeavor, complaining to Germer of being "fairly frantic when I contemplate the idiocy of these louts!" Believing the Babalon Working was accomplished, Parsons sold the Parsonage to developers for $25,000 under the condition that he and Cameron could continue to live in the coach house, and he appointed Roy Leffingwell to head the Agape Lodge, which would now have to meet elsewhere for its rituals.

Parsons co-founded a company called Allied Enterprises with Hubbard and Sara, into which Parsons invested his life savings of $20,970. Hubbard suggested that with this money they travel to Miami to purchase three yachts, which they would then sail through the Panama Canal to the West Coast, where they could sell them on for a profit. Parsons agreed, but many of his friends thought it was a bad idea. Hubbard had secretly requested permission from the U.S. Navy to sail to China and South and Central America on a mission to "collect writing material"; his real plans were for a world cruise. Left "flat broke" by this defrauding, Parsons was incensed when he discovered that Hubbard and Sara had left for Miami with $10,000 of the money; he suspected a scam but was placated by a telephone call from Hubbard and agreed to remain business partners. When Crowley, in a telegram to Germer, dismissed Parsons as a "weak fool" and victim to Hubbard and Sara's obvious confidence trick, Parsons changed his mind, flew to Miami and placed a temporary injunction and restraining order on them. Upon tracking them down to a harbor in County Causeway, Parsons discovered that the couple had purchased three yachts as planned; they tried to flee aboard one but hit a squall and were forced to return to port. Parsons was convinced that he had brought them to shore through a lesser banishing ritual of the pentagram containing an astrological, geomantic invocation of Bartzabel—a vengeful spirit of Mars. Allied Enterprises was dissolved and in a court settlement Hubbard was required to promise to reimburse Parsons. Parsons was discouraged from taking further action by Sara, who threatened to report him for statutory rape since their sexual relationship took place when she was under California's age of consent of 18. Parsons was ultimately compensated with only $2,900. Hubbard, already married to Margaret Grubb, bigamously married Sara and went on to found Dianetics and Scientology.

The Sunday Times published an article about Hubbard's involvement with O.T.O. and Parsons' occult activities in December 1969. In response, the Church of Scientology released an unsubstantiated press statement which said that Hubbard had been sent as an undercover agent by the U.S. Navy to intercept and destroy Parsons' "black magic cult", and save Sara from its influence. The Church also stated that Robert A. Heinlein was the clandestine Navy operative who "sent in" Hubbard to undertake this operation. Returning to California, Parsons completed the sale of the Parsonage, which was then demolished, and resigned from O.T.O. He wrote in his letter to Crowley that he did not believe that "as an autocratic organization, [the O.T.O.] constitutes a true and proper medium for the expression and attainment" of Thelema.

=== Loss of FBI clearance, Red Scare Marxist and espionage accusations and acquittal: 1946–1952 ===
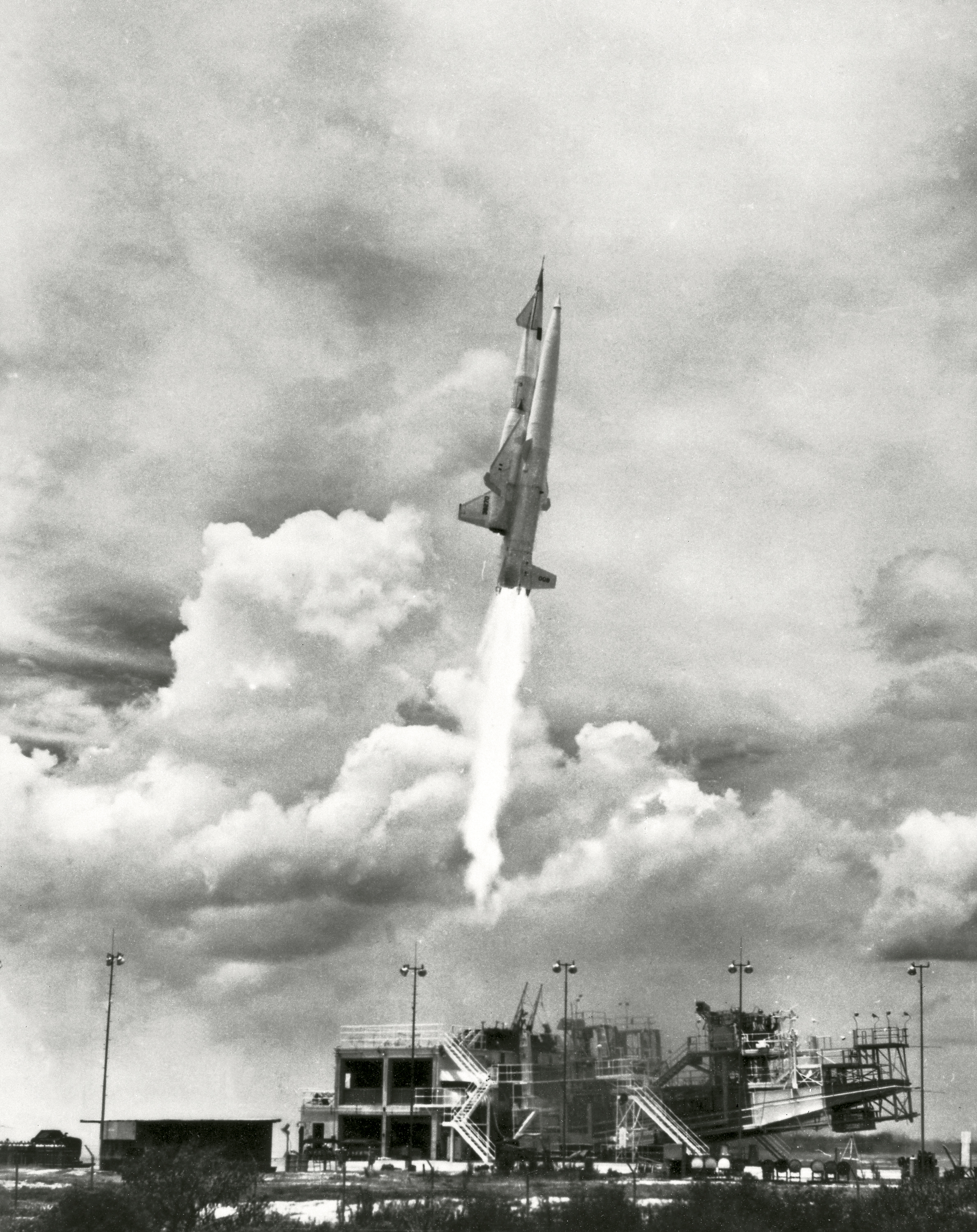
Parsons worked on developing the SM-64 Navaho missile (pictured launching in 1957).

Parsons was employed by North American Aviation at Inglewood, where he worked on the Navaho Missile Program. He and Cameron moved into a house in Manhattan Beach, where he instructed her in occultism and esotericism. When Cameron developed catalepsy, Parsons referred her to Sylvan Muldoon's books on astral projection, suggesting that she could manipulate her seizures to accomplish it. They were married on October 19, 1946, four days after his divorce from Helen was finalized, with Forman as their witness. Parsons continued to be seen as a specialist in rocketry; he acted as an expert consultant in numerous industrial tribunals and police and Army Ordnance investigations regarding explosions. In May 1947, Parsons gave a talk at the Pacific Rocket Society in which he predicted that rockets would take humans to the Moon. Although he had become distant from the now largely defunct O.T.O. and had sold much of his Crowleyan library, he continued to correspond with Crowley until the latter's death in December 1947.

At the emergence of the Cold War, a Red Scare developed in the U.S. as the Congressional House Un-American Activities Committee began investigating and obstructing the careers of people with perceived communist sympathies. Many of Parsons' former colleagues lost their security clearances and jobs as a result, and eventually the FBI stripped Parsons of his clearance because of his "subversive" character, including his involvement in and advocacy of "sexual perversion" in O.T.O. He speculated in a June 1949 letter to Germer that his clearance was revoked in response to his public dissemination of Crowley's Liber OZ, a 1941 tract summarizing the individualist moral principles of Thelema. Declassified FBI documents later revealed that the FBI's primary concern was Parsons' former connections to Marxists at Caltech and his membership of the also "subversive" ACLU. When they interviewed Parsons, he denied communist sympathies but informed them of Sidney Weinbaum's "extreme communist views" and Frank Malina's involvement in Weinbaum's communist cell at Caltech, which resulted in Weinbaum's arrest for perjury since he had lied under oath by denying any involvement in communist groups. Malina's security clearance was withdrawn as well. In reaction to this hostile treatment, Parsons sought work in the rocket industry abroad. He sought advice to do so in correspondence with von Kármán; whose advice he followed by enrolling in an evening course in advanced mathematics at USC to bolster his employability in the field—but again he neglected attendance and failed the course. Parsons again resorted to bootlegging nitroglycerin for money, and managed to earn a wage as a car mechanic, a manual laborer at a gas station, and a hospital orderly; for two years he was also a faculty member at the USC Department of Pharmacology. Relations between Parsons and Cameron became strained; they agreed to a temporary separation and she moved to Mexico to join an artists' commune in San Miguel de Allende.

Unable to pursue his scientific career, without his wife and devoid of friendship, Parsons decided to return to occultism and embarked on sexually based magical operations with prostitutes. He was intent, informally following the ritualistic practice of Thelemite organization the A∴A∴, on performing "the Crossing of the Abyss", attaining union with the universal consciousness, or "All" as understood in the context of the Great Work, and becoming the "Master of the Temple". Following his apparent success in doing so, Parsons recounted having an out-of-body experience invoked by Babalon, who astrally transported him to the biblical City of Chorazin, an experience he referred to as a "Black Pilgrimage". Accompanying Parsons' "Oath of the Abyss" was his own "Oath of the AntiChrist", which was witnessed by Wilfred Talbot Smith. In this oath, Parsons professed to embody an entity named Belarion Armillus Al Dajjal, the Antichrist "who am come to fulfill the law of the Beast 666 [Aleister Crowley]". Viewing these oaths as the completion of the Babalon Working, Parsons wrote an illeist autobiography titled Analysis by a Master of the Temple and an occult text titled The Book of AntiChrist. In the latter work, Parsons (writing as Belarion) prophesied that within nine years Babalon would manifest on Earth and supersede the dominance of the Abrahamic religions.

During this period, Parsons also wrote an essay on his individualist philosophy and politics—which he described as standing for "liberalism and liberal principles"—titled "Freedom is a Two-Edged Sword", in which he condemned the authoritarianism, censorship, corruption, antisexualism and racism he saw as prevalent in American society. None of these works were published in his lifetime. Through Heinlein, Parsons received a visit from writer L. Sprague de Camp, with whom he discussed magic and science fiction, and disclosed that Hubbard had sent a letter offering him Sara back. De Camp later referred to Parsons as "An authentic mad genius if I ever met one", and based the character Courtney James on him in his time travel short story "A Gun for Dinosaur" (1956). Parsons was also visited by Jane Wolfe, who unsuccessfully appealed for him to rejoin the dilapidated O.T.O. He entered a brief relationship with an Irishwoman named Gladis Gohan; they moved to a house in Redondo Beach, a building known by them as the "Concrete Castle". Cameron returned to Redondo Beach from San Miguel de Allende and violently argued with Parsons upon discovering his infidelity, before she again left for Mexico. Parsons responded by initiating divorce proceedings against her on the grounds of "extreme cruelty".

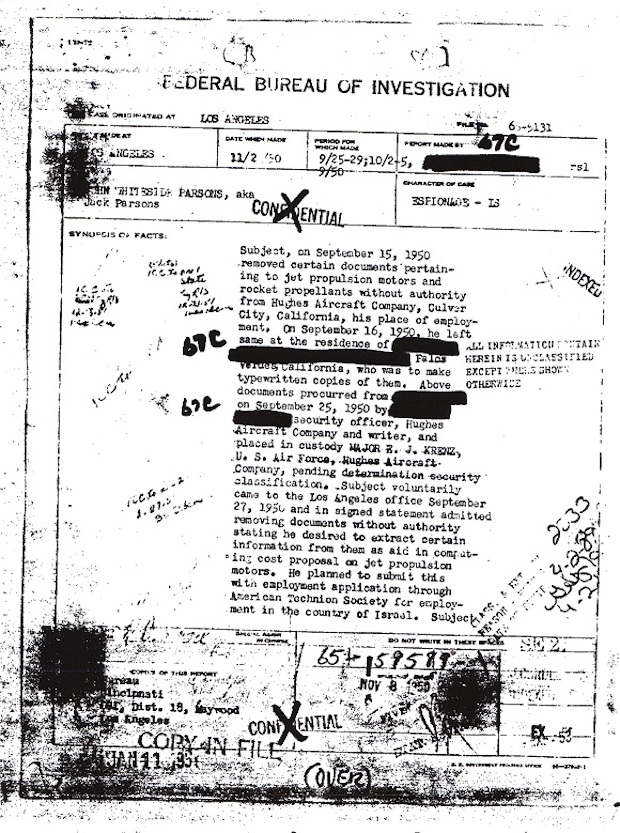
November 1950 FBI synopsis of espionage allegations against Parsons

Parsons testified to a closed federal court that the moral philosophy of Thelema was both anti-fascist and anti-communist, emphasizing his belief in individualism. This along with references from his scientific colleagues resulted in his security clearance being reinstated by the Industrial Employment Review Board, which ruled that there was insufficient evidence that he had ever had communist sympathies. This allowed Parsons to obtain a contract in designing and constructing a chemical plant for the Hughes Aircraft Company in Culver City. Von Kármán put Parsons in touch with Herbert T. Rosenfeld, President of the Southern Californian chapter of the American Technion Society—a Zionist group dedicated to supporting the newly created State of Israel. Rosenfeld offered Parsons a job with the Israeli rocket program and hired him to produce technical reports for them. In November 1950, as the Red Scare intensified, Parsons decided to migrate to Israel to pursue Rosenfeld's offer, but a Hughes secretary whom Parsons had asked to type up a portfolio of technical documents reported him to the FBI. She accused Parsons of espionage and attempted theft of classified company documents on the basis of some of the reports that he had sought to submit to the Technion Society.

Parsons was immediately fired from Hughes; the FBI investigated the complaint and were suspicious that Parsons was spying for the Israeli government. Parsons denied the allegations when interrogated; he insisted that his intentions were peaceful and that he had suffered an error of judgment in procuring the documents. Some of Parsons' scientific colleagues rallied to his defense, but the case against him worsened when the FBI investigated Rosenfeld for being linked to Soviet agents, and more accounts of his occult and sexually permissive activities at the Parsonage came to light. In October 1951, the U.S. attorney decided that because the contents of the reports did not constitute state secrets, Parsons was not guilty of espionage.

The Review Board still considered Parsons a liability because of his historical Marxist affiliations and investigations by the FBI, and in January 1952 they permanently reinstated their ban on his working for classified projects, effectively prohibiting him from working in rocketry. To make a living he founded the Parsons Chemical Manufacturing Company, which was based in North Hollywood and created pyrotechnics and explosives such as fog effects and imitation gunshot wounds for the film industry, and he also returned to chemical manufacturing at the Bermite Powder Company in Saugus.

Dark Angel, a painting by Marjorie Cameron portraying Parsons as the "Angel of Death"

Parsons reconciled with Cameron, and they resumed their relationship and moved into a former coach house on Orange Grove Boulevard. Parsons converted its large, first-floor laundry room into a home laboratory to work on his chemical and pyrotechnic projects, homebrew absinthe and stockpile his materials. They let out the upstairs bedrooms and began holding parties that were attended largely by bohemians and members of the Beat Generation, along with old friends including Forman, Malina and Cornog. They also congregated at the home of Andrew Haley, who lived on the same street. Though Parsons in his mid-thirties was a "prewar relic" to the younger attendees, the raucous socials often lasted until dawn and frequently attracted police attention. Parsons also founded a new Thelemite group known as "the Witchcraft", whose beliefs revolved around a simplified version of Crowley's Thelema and Parsons' own Babalon prophecies. He offered a course in its teachings for a ten-dollar fee, which included a new Thelemic belief system called "the Gnosis", a version of Christian Gnosticism with Sophia as its godhead and the Christian God as its demiurge. He also collaborated with Cameron on Songs for the Witch Woman, a collection of poems which she illustrated that was published in 2014.

=== Death: 1952 ===
Parsons and Cameron decided to travel to Mexico for a few months, both for a vacation and for Parsons to take up a job opportunity establishing an explosives factory for the Mexican government. They hoped that this would facilitate a move to Israel, where they could start a family, and where Parsons could bypass the U.S. government to recommence his rocketry career. He was particularly disturbed by the presence of the FBI, convinced that they were spying on him.

On June 17, 1952, a day before their planned departure, Parsons received a rush order of explosives for a film set and began to work on it in his home laboratory. An explosion destroyed the lower part of the building, during which Parsons sustained mortal wounds. His right forearm was severed, his legs and left arm were broken, and a hole was torn in the right side of his face. Despite these critical injuries, Parsons was found conscious by the upstairs lodgers. He tried to communicate with the arriving ambulance workers, who rushed him to the Huntington Memorial Hospital, where he was declared dead approximately thirty-seven minutes after the explosion. When his mother, Ruth, learned of his death, she immediately took a fatal overdose of barbiturates.

Pasadena Police Department criminologist Don Harding led the official investigation; he concluded that Parsons had been mixing fulminate of mercury in a coffee can when he dropped it on the floor, causing an initial explosion that triggered a larger blast among other chemicals in the room. Forman considered this likely, stating that Parsons often had sweaty hands and could easily have dropped the can. Some of Parsons' colleagues rejected this explanation, saying that he was very attentive about safety. Two colleagues from the Bermite Powder Company described Parsons' work habits as "scrupulously neat" and "exceptionally cautious". The latter statement—from chemical engineer George Santymers—insisted that the explosion must have come from beneath the floorboards, implying an organized plot to kill Parsons. Harding accepted that these inconsistencies were "incongruous" but described the manner in which Parsons had stored his chemicals as "criminally negligent", and noted that Parsons had previously been investigated by the police for illegally storing chemicals at the Parsonage. He also found a morphine-filled syringe at the scene, suggesting that Parsons had been under the influence of narcotics. The police saw insufficient evidence to continue the investigation and closed the case as an accidental death.

John W. Parsons, handsome 37-year-old rocket scientist killed Tuesday in a chemical explosion, was one of the founders of a weird semi-religious cult that flourished here about 10 years ago ... Old police reports yesterday pictured the former Caltech professor as a man who led a double existence—a down-to-earth explosives expert who dabbled in intellectual necromancy. Possibly he was trying to reconcile fundamental human urges with the inhuman, Buck Rogers type of innovations that sprang from his test tubes.

— Parsons' obituary in the June 19, 1952 edition of The Pasadena Independent

Both Wolfe and Smith suggested that Parsons' death had been suicide, stating that he had suffered from depression for some time. Others theorized that the explosion was an assassination planned by Howard Hughes in response to Parsons' suspected theft of Hughes Aircraft Company documents. Cameron became convinced that Parsons had been murdered — either by police officers seeking vengeance for his role in the conviction of Earl Kynette or by anti-Zionists opposed to his work for Israel. One of Cameron's friends, the artist Renate Druks, later stated her belief that Parsons had died in a rite designed to create a homunculus. His death has never been definitively explained.

The immediate aftermath of the explosion attracted the interest of the U.S. media, making headline news in the Los Angeles Times. These initial reports focused on Parsons' prominence in rocketry but neglected to mention his occult interests. When asked for comment, Aerojet secretary-treasurer T.E. Beehan said that Parsons "liked to wander, but he was one of the top men in the field". Within a few days, journalists had discovered his involvement in Thelema and emphasized this in their reports.

A private prayer service was held for Parsons at the funeral home where his body was cremated. Cameron scattered his ashes in the Mojave Desert, before burning most of his possessions. She later tried to perform astral projection to commune with him. O.T.O. also held a memorial service—with attendees including Helen and Sara—at which Smith led the Gnostic Mass.

== Personal life ==
=== Personality ===
Parsons was considered effeminate as a child; in adult life he exhibited an attitude of machismo. Jane Wolfe described him as "potentially bisexual" and he once expressed experiencing a latent homosexuality. The actor Paul Mathison said he had had a gay relationship with Parsons in the 1950s, though this was disputed by others who knew him and Cameron. Parsons had the reputation of being a womanizer, and was notorious for frequently flirting and having sexual liaisons with female staff members at JPL and Aerojet. He was also known for personal eccentricity such as greeting house guests with a large pet snake around his neck, driving to work in a rundown Pontiac, and using a mannequin dressed in a tuxedo with a bucket labelled "The Resident" as his mailbox.

As well as a fencing and archery enthusiast, Parsons was also a keen shooter; he often hunted jack rabbits and cotton tails in the desert, and was amused by mock dueling with Forman while on test sites with rifles and shotguns. Upon proposing to his first wife Helen, he gave her a pistol. Parsons enjoyed playing pranks on his colleagues, often through detonating explosives such as firecrackers and smoke bombs, and was known to spend hours at a time in the bathtub playing with toy boats while living at the Parsonage.

As well as intense bursts of creativity, Parsons suffered from what he described as "manic hysteria and depressing melancholy". His father Marvel, after suffering a near-fatal heart attack, died in 1947 as a psychiatric patient at St. Elizabeths Hospital in Washington, D.C., diagnosed with severe clinical depression, a condition Pendle suggested the younger Parsons inherited.

=== Professional associations ===
Parsons' obituary listed him as a member of the Army Ordnance Association, the American Institute of Aeronautics and Astronautics, the American Chemical Society, the American Association for the Advancement of Science, and—despite his lack of an academic degree—the Sigma Xi fraternity. It also stated that he had turned down several honorary degrees.

== Philosophy ==
=== Religious beliefs ===
[Parsons] treated magic and rocketry as different sides of the same coin: both had been disparaged, both derided as impossible, but because of this both presented themselves as challenges to be conquered. Rocketry postulated that we should no longer see ourselves as creatures chained to the earth but as beings capable of exploring the universe.

Similarly, magic suggested there were unseen metaphysical worlds that existed and could be explored with the right knowledge. Both rocketry and magic were rebellions against the very limits of human existence; in striving for one challenge he could not help but strive for the other.

— George Pendle

Parsons adhered to the occult philosophy of Thelema, which had been founded in 1904 by the English occultist Aleister Crowley following a spiritual revelation that he had in Cairo, Egypt, when—according to Crowley's accounts—a spirit being known as Aiwass dictated to him a prophetic text known as The Book of the Law. Prior to becoming aware of Thelema and Crowley, Parsons' interest in esotericism was developed through his reading of The Golden Bough (1890), a work in comparative mythology by Scottish social anthropologist James George Frazer. Parsons had also attended lectures on Theosophy by philosopher Jiddu Krishnamurti with his first wife Helen, but disliked the belief system's sentiment of "the good and the true". During rocket tests, Parsons often recited Crowley's poem "Hymn to Pan" as a good luck charm. He took to addressing Crowley as his "Most Beloved Father" and signed off to him as "thy son, John".

In July 1945, Parsons gave a speech to the Agape Lodge, in which he attempted to explain how he felt that The Book of the Law could be made relevant to "modern life". In this speech, which was subsequently published under the title of "Doing Your Will", he examined the Thelemite concept of True Will, writing that:

The mainspring of an individual is his creative Will. This Will is the sum of his tendencies, his destiny, his inner truth. It is one with the force that makes the birds sing and flowers bloom; as inevitable as gravity, as implicit as a bowel movement, it informs alike atoms and men and suns.

To the man who knows this Will, there is no why or why not, no can or cannot; he is!

There is no known force that can turn an apple into an alley cat; there is no known force that can turn a man from his Will. This is the triumph of genius; that, surviving the centuries, enlightens the world.

This force burns in every man.

Parsons identified four obstacles that prevented humans from achieving and performing their True Will, all of which he connected with fear: the fear of incompetence, the fear of the opinion of others, the fear of hurting others, and the fear of insecurity. He insisted that these must be overcome, writing that "The Will must be freed of its fetters. The ruthless examination and destruction of taboos, complexes, frustrations, dislikes, fears and disgusts hostile to the Will is essential to progress."

Though Parsons was a lifelong devotee to Thelema, he grew weary of and eventually left Ordo Templi Orientis—the religious organization that began propagating Thelema under Crowley's leadership from the 1910s—which Parsons viewed, despite the disagreement of Crowley himself, as excessively hierarchical and impeding upon the rigorous spiritual and philosophical practice of True Will, describing O.T.O. as "an excellent training school for adepts, but hardly an appropriate Order for the manifestation of Thelema". In this sense Parsons was described by Carter as an "almost fundamentalist" Thelemite who placed The Book of the Law's dogma above all other doctrine.

=== Politics ===
[Parsons] had witnessed the blinding overnight successes achieved by the government-by-terror totalitarianism of Stalinist Russia and Nazi Germany. He had the foresight to see that [the United States of] America, once armed with the new powers of total destruction and surveillance that were sure to follow the swelling flood of new technologies, had the potential to become even more repressive unless its founding principles of individual liberty were religiously preserved and its leaders held accountable to them.
Two of the keys to redressing the balance were the freedom of women and an end to the state control of individual sexual expression. He knew that these potent forces, embodied as they are in a majority of the world's population, had the power, once unleashed, to change the world.

— William Breeze (Hymenaeus Beta), current Frater Superior of Ordo Templi Orientis

From early on in his career, Parsons took an interest in socialism and communism, views that he shared with his friend Frank Malina. Under the influence of another friend, Sidney Weinbaum, the two joined a communist group in the late 1930s, with Parsons reading Marxist literature, but he remained unconvinced and refused to join the American Communist Party. Malina asserted that this was because Parsons was a "political romantic", whose attitude was more anti-authoritarian than anti-capitalist. Parsons later became critical of the Marxist–Leninist government of the Soviet Union led by Joseph Stalin, sarcastically commenting that

The dictatorship of the proletariat is merely temporary — the state will eventually wither away like a snark hunter, leaving us all free as birds. Meanwhile, it may be necessary to kill, torture and imprison a few million people, but whose fault is it if they get in the way of progress?

During the era of McCarthyism and the Second Red Scare in the early 1950s, Parsons was questioned regarding his former links to the communist movement, by which time he denied any connection to it, instead describing himself as "an individualist" who was both anti-communist and anti-fascist. In reaction to the McCarthyite red-baiting of scientists, he expressed disdain that

[s]cience, that was going to save the world in H. G. Wells' time is regimented, straight-jacked, [and] scared shitless, its universal language diminished to one word, security.

Parsons was politically influenced by Thelema, which holds to the ethical code of "Do what thou wilt". In his essay, "Freedom is a Lonely Star", Parsons equated this principle to the libertarian views of a number of the Founding Fathers of the United States. By his own time, he wrote, these values had been "sold out by America, and for that reason the heart of America is sick and the soul of America is dead." He proceeded to criticize many aspects of contemporary U.S. society, particularly the police force ("[t]he police mind is usually of a sadistic and homicidal trend") and note they carried out the "ruthless punishment of symbolic scapegoats" such as African-Americans, prostitutes, alcoholics, homeless people and sociopolitical radicals, under the pretense of a country that upheld "liberty and justice for all."

To bring about a freer future, Parsons believed in liberalizing attitudes to sexual morality stating that, in his belief, the publication of the Kinsey Reports and development of the psychonautical sciences had as significant an influence on Western society as the creation of the atomic bomb and the development of nuclear physics. He believed that in the future the restrictions on sexual morality within society should be abolished in order to bring about greater freedom and individuality. Parsons concluded that

the liberty of the individual is the foundation of civilization. No true civilization is possible without this liberty and no state, national or international, is stable in its absence. The proper relation between individual liberty on the one hand and social responsibility on the other is the balance which will assure a stable society. The only other road to social equilibrium demands the total annihilation of individuality. There is not further evasion of nature's immemorial ultimatum: change or perish but the choice of change is ours.

Jack Cashill, American studies professor at Purdue University, argues that "Although his literary career never got much beyond pamphleteering and an untitled anti-war, anti-capitalist manuscript", Parsons played a significant role—greater than that of Church of Satan founder Anton LaVey—in shaping the Californian counterculture of the 1960s and beyond through his influence on contemporaries such as Hubbard and Heinlein. Hugh Urban, religious studies professor at Ohio State University, cites Parsons' Witchcraft group as precipitating the neopagan revival of the 1950s.

Robert Anton Wilson, a cult writer and occultist known for his works of nonfiction and science fiction, described Parsons' political writings as exemplifying an "ultra-individualist" who exhibited a "genuine sympathy for working people", strongly empathized with feminism and held an antipathy toward patriarchy comparable to that of John Stuart Mill. Wilson argued in this context that Parsons was an influence on the American libertarian and anarchist movements of the 20th century.

Parsons was also supportive of the creation of the State of Israel. He made plans to emigrate there when his military security clearance was revoked.

== Legacy and influence ==
The modern logo of the Jet Propulsion Laboratory

In the decades following his death, Parsons was well-remembered among the Western esoteric community; his scientific recognition frequently amounted to a footnote. For instance, English Thelemite Kenneth Grant suggested that Parsons' Babalon Working marked the start of the appearance of flying saucers in the skies, leading to phenomena such as the Roswell UFO incident and Kenneth Arnold UFO sighting – Grant's ideas found new life in the 2010 book Final Events. Cameron postulated that the 1952 Washington, D.C. UFO incident was a spiritual reaction to Parsons' death. In 1954 she portrayed Babalon in American Thelemite Kenneth Anger's short film Inauguration of the Pleasure Dome, viewing this cinematic depiction of a Thelemic ritual as aiding the literal invocation of Babalon begun by Parsons' working, and later said that his Book of the AntiChrist prophecies were fulfilled through the manifestation of Babalon in her person.

In December 1958, JPL was integrated into the newly established National Aeronautics and Space Administration, having built the Explorer 1 satellite that commenced America's Space Race with the Soviet Union. Aerojet was contracted by NASA to build the main engine of the Apollo Command/Service Module, and the Space Shuttle Orbital Maneuvering System. In a letter to Frank Malina, von Kármán ranked Parsons first in a list of figures he viewed as most important to modern rocketry and the foundation of the American space program. According to Richard Metzger, Wernher von Braun—who was nicknamed "The Father of Rocket Science"—once argued that Parsons was more worthy of this moniker. In October 1968, Malina, a pioneer in sounding rocketry, gave a speech at JPL in which he highlighted Parsons' contribution to the U.S. rocket project, and lamented how it had come to be neglected, crediting him for making "key contributions to the development of storable propellants and of long duration solid propellant agents that play such an important role in American and European space technology."

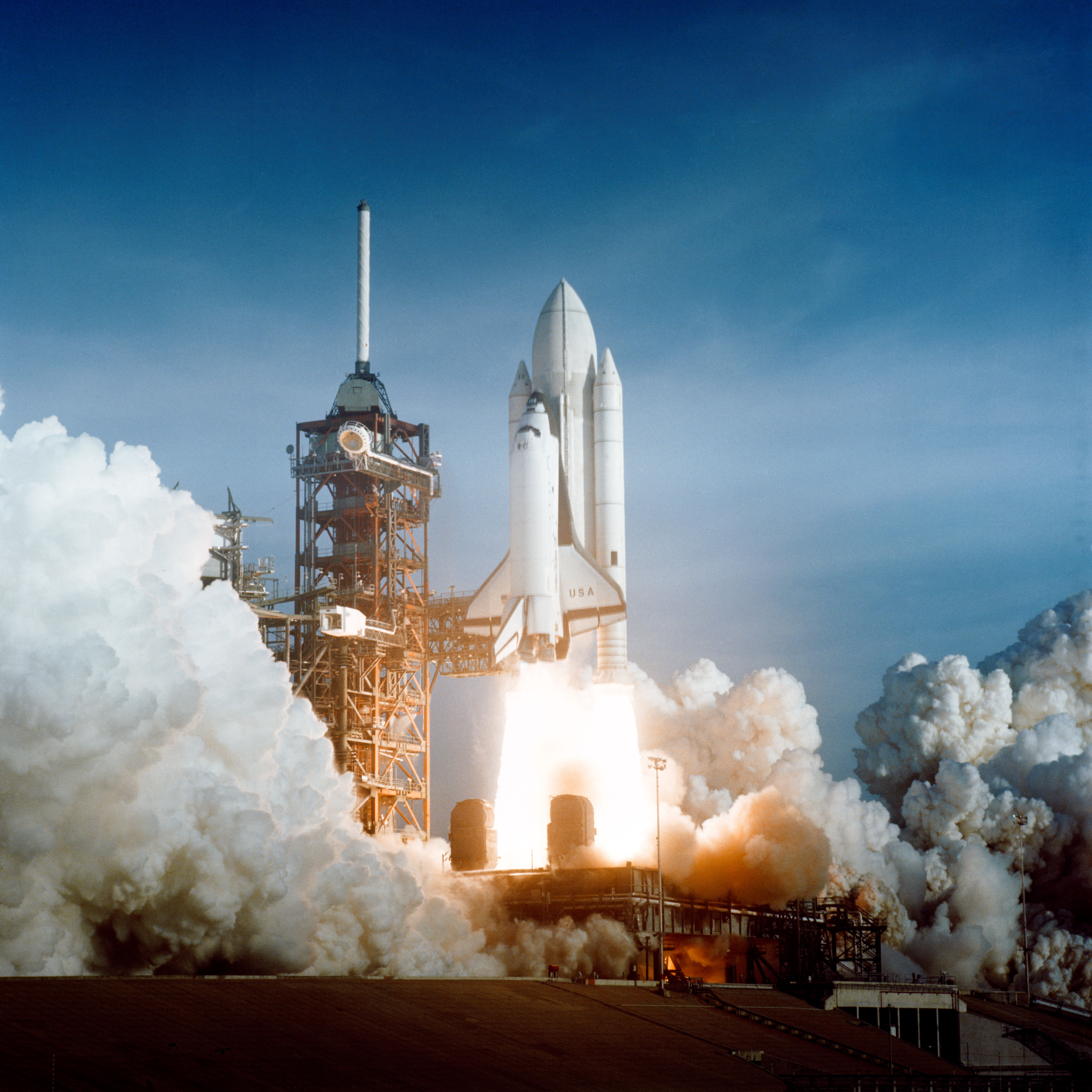
Parsons is credited for inventions used in rocket technology such as the Space Shuttle.

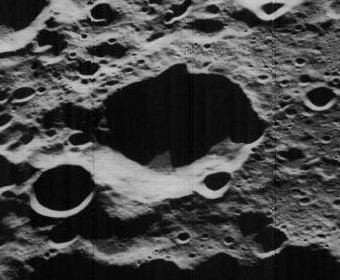
The Parsons Moon crater

The same month, JPL held an open access event to mark the 32nd anniversary of its foundation—which featured a "nativity scene" of mannequins reconstructing the November 1936 photograph of the GALCIT Group—and erected a monument commemorating their first rocket test on Halloween 1936. Among the aerospace industry, JPL was nicknamed as standing for "Jack Parsons' Laboratory" or "Jack Parsons Lives". The International Astronomical Union decided to name a crater on the far side of the Moon Parsons after him in 1972. JPL later credited him for making "distinctive technical innovations that advanced early efforts" in rocket engineering, with aerospace journalist Craig Covault stating that the work of Parsons, Qian Xuesen and the GALCIT Group "planted the seeds for JPL to become preeminent in space and rocketry."

Many of Parsons' writings were posthumously published as Freedom is a Two-Edged Sword in 1989, a compilation co-edited by Cameron and O.T.O. leader Hymenaeus Beta, which incited a resurgence of interest in Parsons within occult and countercultural circles. For example, comic book artist and occultist Alan Moore noted Parsons as a creative influence in a 1998 interview with Clifford Meth. The Cameron-Parsons Foundation was founded as an incorporated company in 2006, with the intention of conserving and promoting Parsons' writings and Cameron's artwork, and in 2014 Fulger Esoterica published Songs for the Witch Woman—a limited edition book of poems by Parsons with illustrations by Cameron, released to coincide with his centenary. An exhibition of the same name was held at the Museum of Contemporary Art, Los Angeles.

In 1999, Feral House published the biography Sex and Rockets: The Occult World of Jack Parsons by John Carter, who opined that Parsons had accomplished more in under five years of research than Robert H. Goddard had in his lifetime, and said that his role in the development of rocket technology had been neglected by historians of science; Carter thought that Parsons' abilities and accomplishments as an occultist had been overestimated and exaggerated among Western esotericists, emphasizing his disowning by Crowley for practicing magic beyond his grade. Feral House republished the work as a new edition in 2004, accompanied with an introduction by Robert Anton Wilson. Wilson believed that Parsons was "the one single individual who contributed the most to rocket science", describing him as being "very strange, very brilliant, very funny, [and] very tormented", and considering it noteworthy that the day of Parsons' birth was the predicted beginning of the apocalypse advocated by Charles Taze Russell, the founder of the Bible Student movement.

In 2005, Weidenfeld & Nicolson published Strange Angel: The Otherworldly Life of Rocket Scientist John Whiteside Parsons by George Pendle, who described Parsons as "the Che Guevara of occultism". Pendle said that although Parsons "would not live to see his dream of space travel come true, he was essential to making it a reality." Pendle considered that the cultural stigma attached to Parsons' occultism was the primary cause of his low public profile, noting that "Like many scientific mavericks, Parsons was eventually discarded by the establishment once he had served his purpose." It was this unorthodox mindset, creatively facilitated by his science fiction fandom and "willingness to believe in magic's efficacy", Pendle argued, "that allowed him to break scientific barriers previously thought to be indestructible"—commenting that Parsons "saw both space and magic as ways of exploring these new frontiers—one breaking free from Earth literally and metaphysically."

L. Ron Hubbard's role in Parsons' Agape Lodge and the ensuing yacht scam were explored in Russell Miller's 1987 Hubbard biography Bare-faced Messiah. Parsons' involvement in the Agape Lodge was also discussed by Martin P. Starr in his history of the American Thelemite movement, The Unknown God: W.T. Smith and the Thelemites, published by Teitan Press in 2003. The QI Book of the Dead (2004), based on the BBC game show, included a Parsons obituary. Parsons' occult partnership with Hubbard was also mentioned in Alex Gibney's 2015 documentary film Going Clear: Scientology and the Prison of Belief, produced by HBO.

Before his death, Parsons appeared in science fiction writer Anthony Boucher's murder-mystery novel Rocket to the Morgue (1942) under the guise of mad scientist character Hugo Chantrelle. Another fictional character based on Parsons was Courtney James, a wealthy socialite who features in L. Sprague de Camp's 1956 short time travel story A Gun for Dinosaur. In 2005, Pasadena Babalon, a stage play about Parsons written by George D. Morgan and directed by Brian Brophy, premiered at Caltech as a production by its theater Arts Group in 2010, the same year Cellar Door Publishing released Richard Carbonneau and Robin Simon Ng's graphic novel, The Marvel: A Biography of Jack Parsons.

Parsons' mythology was incorporated into the narrative of David Lynch's mystery-horror television series Twin Peaks. In 2014, AMC Networks announced plans for a serial television dramatization of Parsons' life, but in 2016 it was reported that the series "will not be going forward." In 2017, the project was adopted as a web television series by CBS All Access. Strange Angel, produced by Mark Heyman and starring Irish actor Jack Reynor as Parsons, premiered in June 2018 and ran for two seasons. Parsons appears as a side character in China Miéville's 2016 fantastical novella, The Last Days of New Paris. In 2018, Parsons was featured in an episode of the Amazon series Lore. Also in 2018, Parsons' exploits were featured in the fifth season, second episode of Drunk History entitled "Dangerous Minds".

Parsons is the subject of musical tributes by Johan Johannson (Fordlandia, 2008), Six Organs of Admittance (Parsons' Blues, 2012), The Claypool Lennon Delirium (South of Reality, 2019), and Luke Haines and Peter Buck (Beat Poetry for Survivalists, 2020).

== Patents ==
- U.S. patent 2,484,355, Aerojet 1945. Reaction motor with propellant charge mounted in it. Classification: Propellant charge supports.
- U.S. patent 2,563,265, Aerojet 1943. Rocket motor with solid propellant and propellant charge therefor. Classification: Rocket-engine plants, i.e. plants carrying both fuel and oxidant therefor; Control thereof using semi-solid or pulverulent propellants.
- U.S. patent 2,573,471, Aerojet 1943 with Frank J. Malina. Reaction motor operable by liquid propellants and method of operating it. Classification: Propellants.
- U.S. patent 2,693,077, 1944/1950 with Frank J. Malina. Reaction motor operable by liquid propellants and method of operating it. Classification: Propellants.
- U.S. patent 2,771,739, Aerojet 1953 with Frank J. Malina. Rocket propulsion method. Classification: Propellants.
- U.S. patent 2,774,214, Aerojet 1954 with Frank J. Malina, 1954. Rocket propulsion method. Classification: Compositions in which the components are separately stored ...
- U.S. patent 2,783,138, Aerojet 1944. Propellant compositions. Classification: Catalytic reforming characterised by the catalyst used containing platinum group metals or compounds thereof.

== See also ==
- Members of Ordo Templi Orientis
- Scientology and the occult
