= Moore (lunar crater) =

Crater on the Moon

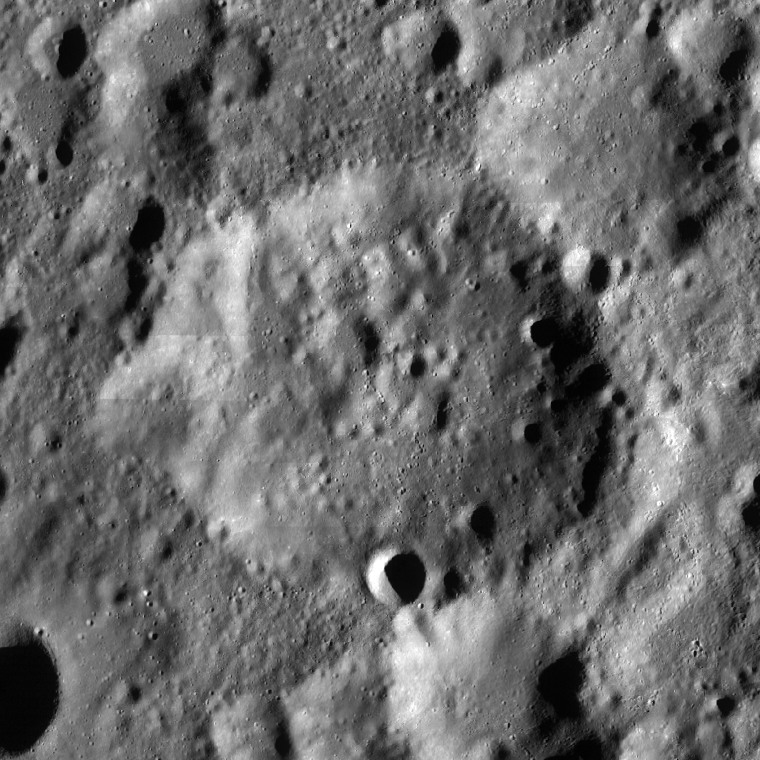
- LRO WAC mosaic
- Coordinates: 37.4°N 177.5°W
- Diameter: 54 km
- Depth: Unknown
- Colongitude: 178° at sunrise
- Eponym: Joseph H. Moore

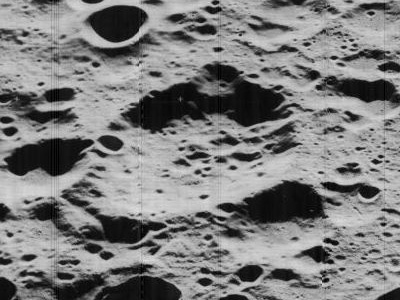
Oblique Lunar Orbiter 5 image, facing west

Moore is an impact crater that is located on the far side of the Moon. Like much of the far side, Moore is located in a region that has been saturated by impacts. Nearby craters of note are Larmor to the south-southwest, and Parsons about the same distance to the west.

This crater has been worn and damaged by subsequent impacts, particularly along the western rim where it is overlain by a double-crater. The interior floor is irregular and marked by a merged chain of impacts that runs from the northwest rim to the midpoint. The satellite crater Moore L is attached to the south-southeast outer rim. To the east, the satellite crater Moore F has a relatively high-albedo rim, and lies at the center of a small ray system.

The crater's name was adopted by the IAU in 1970.

== Satellite craters ==
By convention these features are identified on lunar maps by placing the letter on the side of the crater midpoint that is closest to Moore.

Moore	Latitude	Longitude	Diameter
F	37.4° N	175.0° W	24 km
L	36.1° N	177.1° W	27 km

The fresh crater Moore F is less than 150 million years old and so dates to the Copernican period of the lunar geologic timescale.

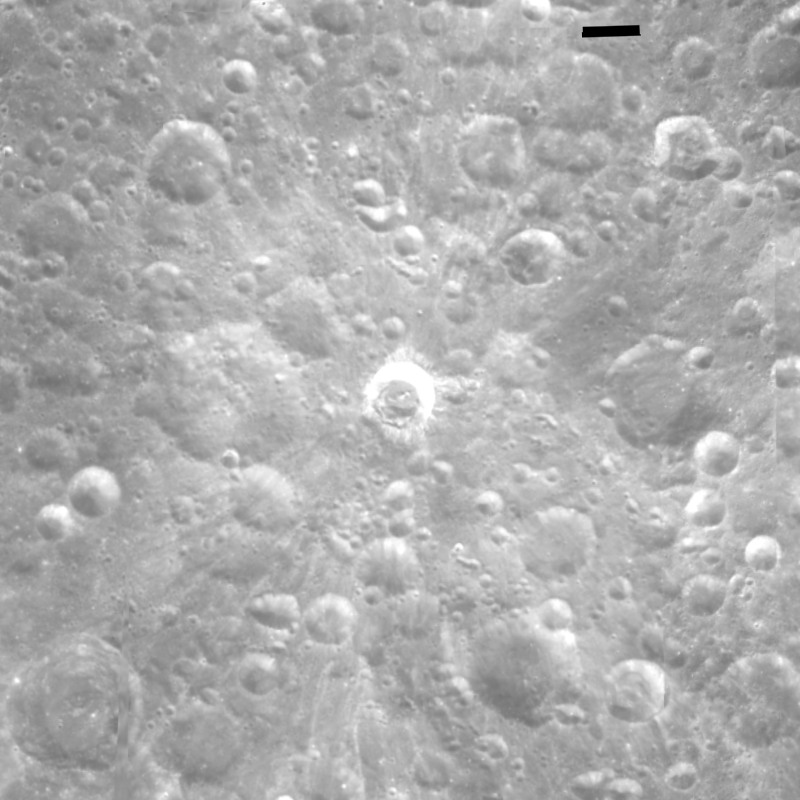
Moore F crater showing much of its bright ray system. Clementine mosaic.
