= Edward Forman =

American engineer, inventor

Edward Seymour Forman
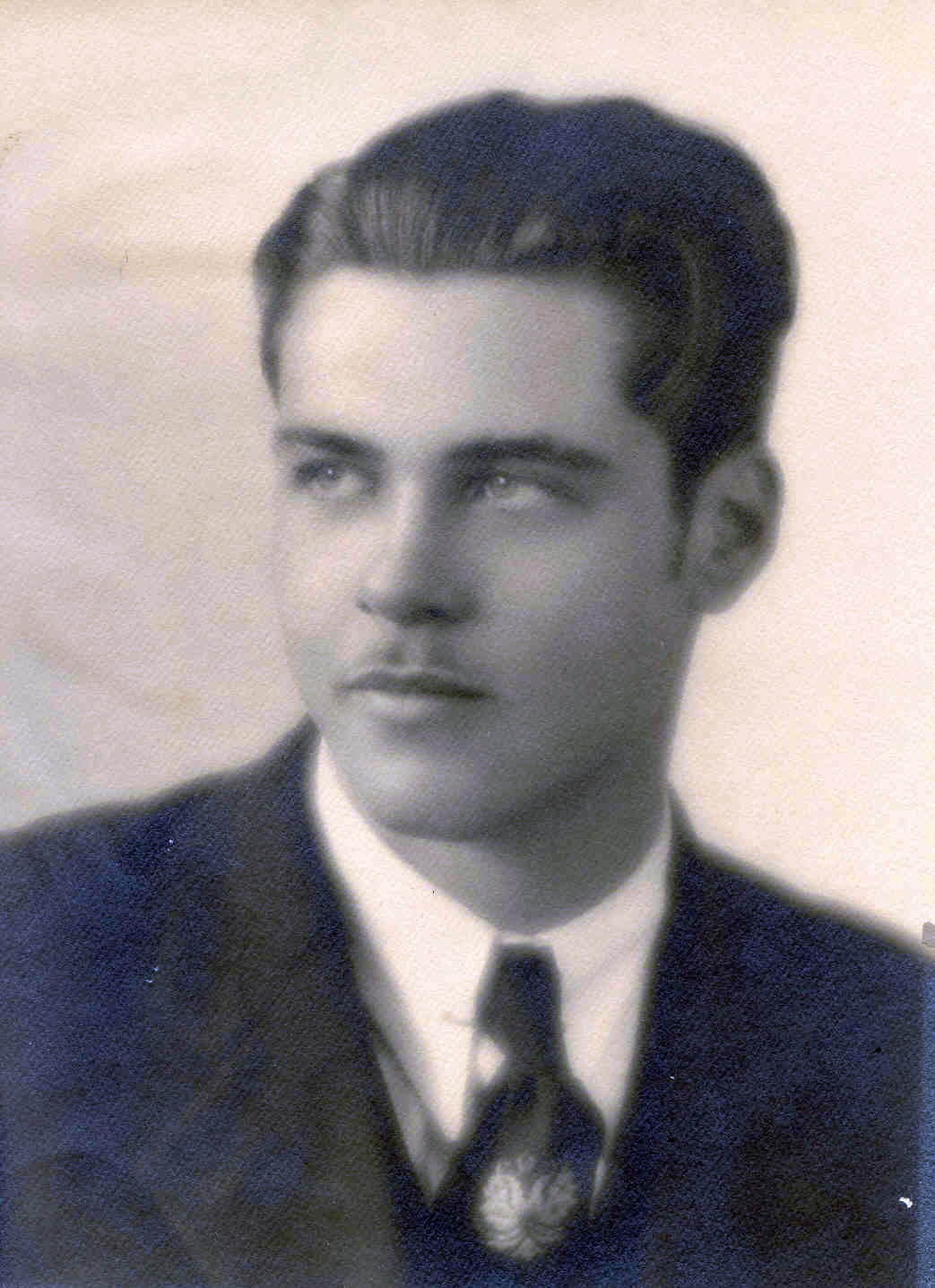
- Forman in 1932
- Born: December 3, 1912; Gillespie, Illinois
- Died: February 12, 1973 (aged 60)
- Occupation: Rocket engineer
- Organizations: Jet Propulsion Laboratory; California Institute of Technology; Aerojet Engineering Corporation; Hughes Aircraft Company; Lockheed Martin Corp

Edward Seymour Forman (December 3, 1912 – February 12, 1973) was an American engineer and inventor known for his pioneering work in early rocketry in the United States. Forman, along with his collaborators in Guggenheim Aeronautical Laboratory at the California Institute of Technology (GALCIT), demonstrated the first practical jet-assisted take-off (JATO) of an aircraft in the United States. Forman was among the GALCIT innovators that went on to found Aerojet General Corporation, the largest rocket technology manufacturer in the 1940s, and the GALCIT Rocket Research Group itself became the precursor of the Jet Propulsion Laboratory.

== Early life and education ==
Forman was born in Gillespie, Illinois, the youngest of four brothers. The family moved to Pasadena, California and Forman attended Washington Junior High School, where he met Jack Parsons, who would become his lifelong collaborator and friend. Forman found Parsons, who was two years younger than he, being bullied at school and rescued him. Soon after that, the two boys grew a strong bond over their common interest in science fiction. Forman was an avid reader of the Barsoom series by Edgar Rice Burroughs, which is quoted as having influenced a generation of scientists and thinkers, including Carl Sagan. Inspired by science fiction, Forman and Parsons started building model rockets in their backyards and adopted the Latin phrase Ad Astra per Aspera (through rough ways to the stars)as their motto. "It was our desire and intent to develop the ability to rocket to the moon", Forman later said about their high ambition as teenagers.

During high school at John Muir High in Pasadena, Forman and Parsons continued with their experiments in their backyards and out in the deserts. Forman left high school before getting a degree and enrolled in Pasadena Junior College. With his overriding interest in rocketry, Forman took on an array of odd jobs to make ends meet. He worked as carpenter, chauffeur and postal worker as well as airplane mechanic, sheet metal worker and apprentice machinist in aircraft and ammunition factories. Meanwhile, Parsons found part-time work in Hercules Powder Company, an explosive manufacturer, where he taught himself to be a chemist. The pair used their newfound skills to improve the design of their rockets and, as the tests grew more complex and explosive, moved their testing site into the nearby Arroyo Seco, a dry canyon wash at the foot of the San Gabriel Mountains.

== Research ==
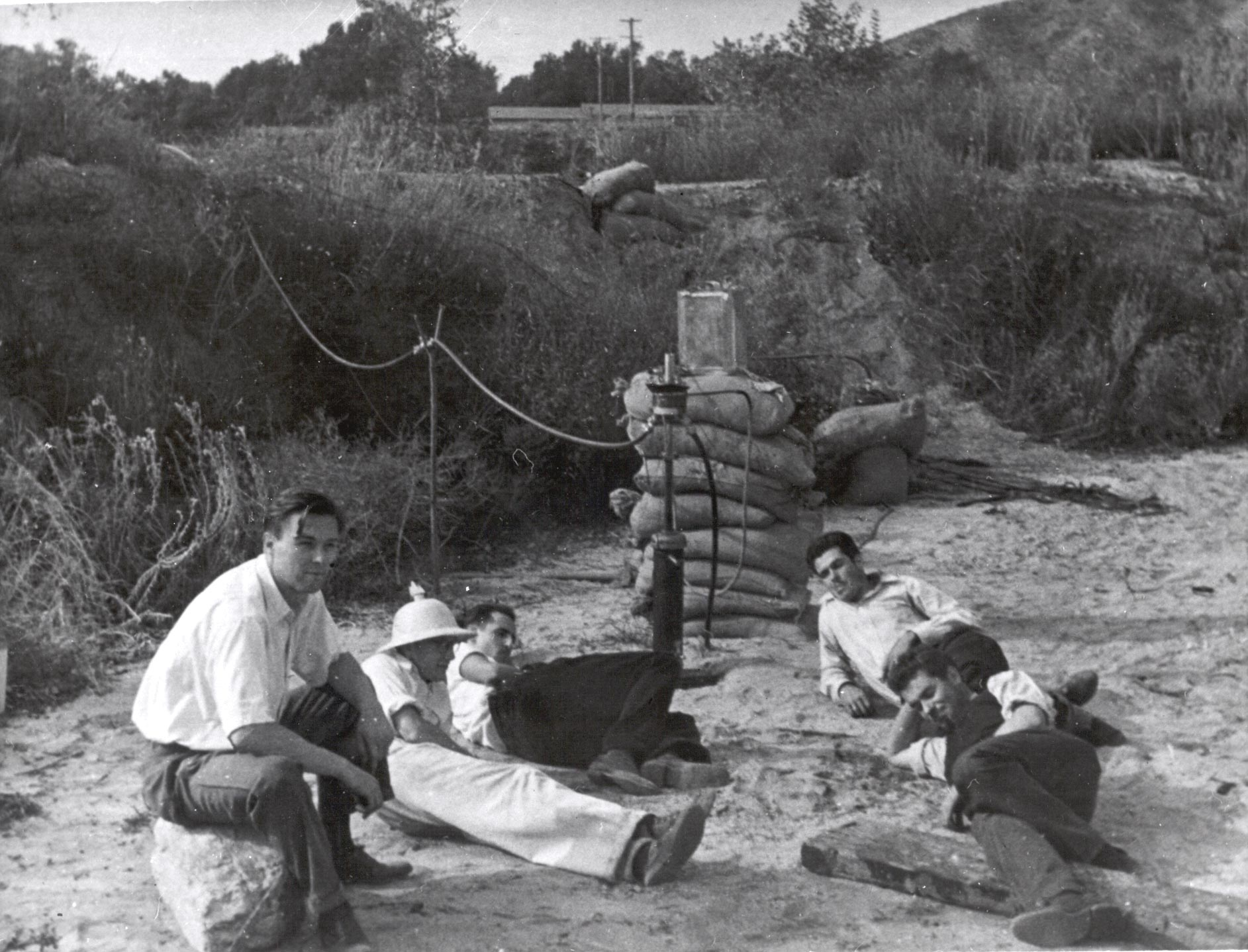
GALCIT members in the Arroyo Seco, November 1936. Left foreground to right: Rudolph Schott, Amo Smith, Frank Malina, Ed Forman, and Jack Parsons. This photo is known in the JPL community as the Nativity Scene.

=== GALCIT Rocket Research Group ===
In the early 1930s, Forman and Parsons began to realize that the rocket technology was a more complex subject than they had first assumed. They corresponded with rocketry experts on both sides of the Atlantic, but Forman later reminisced that they learned very little beyond the fact that nobody else had yet achieved much.In 1935, a Los Angeles Times article titled “Rocket Plane Visualized Flying 1200 Miles Hour” caught the pair's eyes. The article covered a paper by William Bollay, an aeronautics graduate student at Caltech, on the works of Austrian engineer Eugen Sänger. When they approached Bollay, he directed them to Frank Malina, another graduate student, who was pursuing studies in rocket propulsion. Malina shared their enthusiasm about rocketry and agreed to join their efforts.

The trio put together a research proposal to request funding from Caltech. Initially, Foreman and Parsons wanted to propose the development of a sounding rocket, but Malina argued in favor of a more fundamental project aimed at understanding the thermodynamics in a rocket engine through static tests. Malina later recounted that "Parsons and Forman were not too pleased with an austere program that did not include at least the launching of model rockets", but the group reached a consensus to propose a static-fire-test of an alcohol-based rocket motor before building a launchable prototype. Nevertheless, when the proposal was submitted to Caltech, it was turned down and derided as impractical.

The group then approached Theodore von Kármán, Caltech Professor of Aeronautics and the director of Guggenheim Aeronautical Laboratory (GALCIT), who was known for his unorthodox teaching and research methods. They were able to convince von Kármán to let them use the resources of GALCIT after hours for their work. Von Kármán later wrote, “I was immediately captivated by the earnestness and the enthusiasm of these young men. Most young people are quite serious about their dreams, so this in itself was not what interested me; it was the unusually strong background of these young rocketeers….” He saw Malina as an outstanding student of aeronautics, Parsons as a self-taught yet capable chemist and Forman as an ardent rocketeer to whom rocket engines were as familiar as car engines are to an automobile tinkerer.

The group took the name "GALCIT Rocket Research Group" although it was not funded by or officially affiliated with GALCIT or Caltech. The group also attracted a new member, Apollo A.M.O. Smith, another Caltech graduate student. To build the motor and testing rig, the group had to scrounge parts from junkyards and use the earnings from their day jobs, which Forman later described as a "hand-to-mouth operation". The group's first liquid-fuel motor test took place near the Devil's Gate Dam in the Arroyo Seco on Halloween 1936. The rocket failed to achieve ignition in the first three attempts, and the fourth attempt accidentally ignited the oxygen line and dismantled the whole setup. It was found that the powder fuse was the source of the problem, so Forman modified the motor to accommodate a spark plug fuse and replaced the rubber hose in the oxygen line with copper tubes. The second test on November 15 achieved successful ignition and Malina was able to collect the thrust data. Two more tests followed on November 28, 1936, and January 26, 1937, which generated more data for Malina.

The test results impressed von Kármán who allocated laboratory space on the third floor of Guggenheim for further experiments. He hired Forman and Parsons as part-time employees and added Qian Xuesen, a mathematician working on his Ph.D. at Caltech, to the group. But soon after, a rocket fuel leak caused extensive damage to the building which happened to house the largest wind tunnel in the world at the time. The incidence got the group evicted from the laboratory space. A few months later, a thrust balance they had installed on Guggenheim's outside wall exploded and propelled a piece of a gauge into the building. These accidents earned the group the moniker "suicide squad". The notoriety of the group spread off-campus as newspapers carried articles about them and Popular Mechanics ran a photo of their experiments. However, the subsequent news coverage, focused on the Caltech graduate students—Smith, Malina and Xuesen, and Forman and Parsons were excluded.

By early 1938, the group had improved the operating time of their static rocket motor from three seconds to over a minute before the parts got overheated.

=== JATO: development and test flight ===
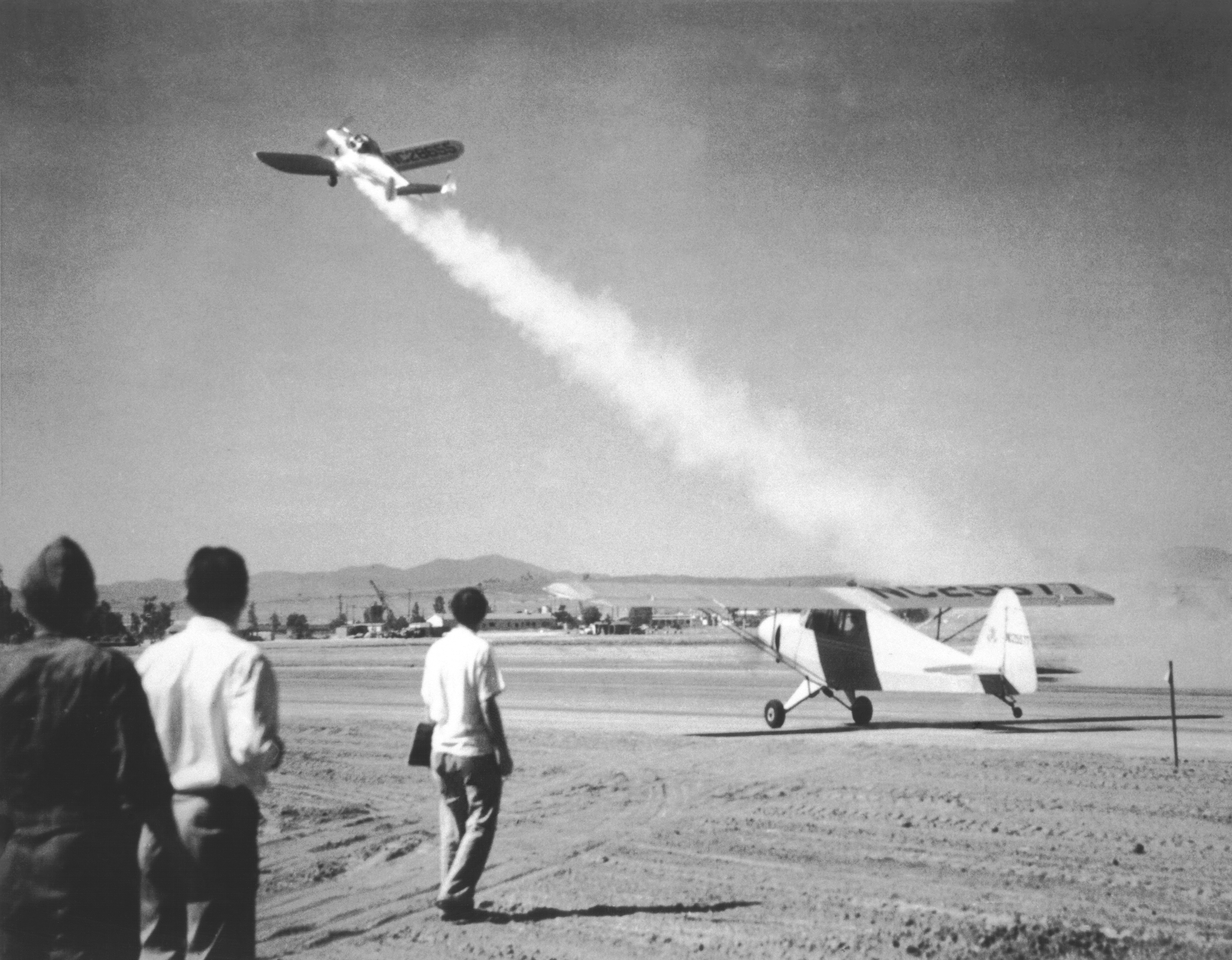
Take-off on August 12, 1941, of America's first "rocket-assisted" fixed-wing aircraft, an ERCO Ercoupe fitted with a GALCIT developed solid propellant JATO booster

In May 1938, Chief of the Army Air Corps General Henry A. "Hap" Arnold visited the laboratory to investigate the possible use of rocketry for the Army, in particular the possibility for a solution for the problem of heavily loaded military planes having to take off on shorter runways. This later turned into a $10,000 contract to develop Jet-Assisted-Take-Off units for the Air Corps.

In early 1939, the National Academy of Sciences provided $1,000 to von Kármán and the Rocket Research Group to research rocket-assisted take-off of aircraft. This JATO research was the first rocket research to receive financial support from the U.S. government.

In the summer of 1941, GALCIT research led to a successful flight test, when Army test pilot Captain Homer Boushey flew a light Ercoupe monoplane with two 50-pound JATO units attached, and made several flights. For the last attempt, they removed the propeller, and on 23 August 1941, Boushey made the first unassisted rocket propelled flight with six JATOs under the wings.

== Career ==
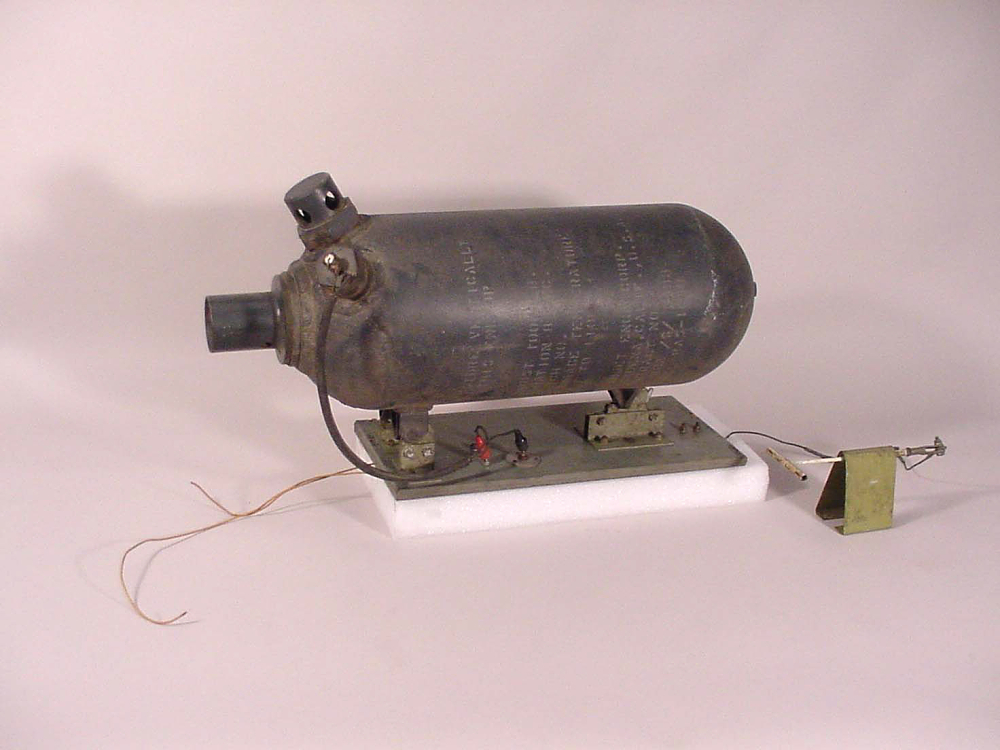

Solid-fuel JATO unit manufactured by Aerojet at the National Air and Space Museum

Under contract with the armed forces, these early rockets, called JATOs (Jet-Assisted Take Off), were fastened under the wings of airplanes to accelerate takeoff. In 1942, Kármán, Malina, Parsons, Forman and another graduate student Martin Summerfield invested $250 each of their own money to found Aerojet General Corporation for the purpose of manufacturing the JATOs. Forman was one of six founding members along with Parsons, Malina, Kármán, and two others, of Aerojet Engineering Corporation, which was incorporated in March 1942.

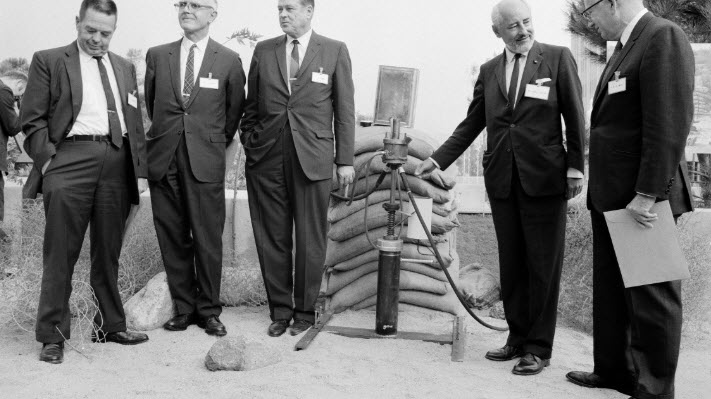

JPL celebration of the 32nd anniversary of the first rocket motor tests (October 31, 1968). Posing with the replica of the first rocket motor test stand, from left to right, William C. Rockefeller, William A. Bollay, Edward S. Forman, Frank J. Malina, and Apollo M.O. Smith.

In 1943, the Army Air Forces asked GALCIT to study the possible use of rockets to propel long-range missiles. The response sent in reply, dated 20 November 1943, was the first document to use the Jet Propulsion Laboratory name, even though as far as Caltech was concerned, the JPL did not yet formally exist. According to Malina, the work of the JPL was considered to include the rocketry research carried out by the GALCIT Rocket Research Group from 1936 on.

Aerojet's first two contracts were from the U.S. Navy; the Bureau of Aeronautics requested a solid-fuel JATO and Wilbur Wright Field requested a liquid-fuel unit. The Air Corps had requested two thousand JATOs from Aerojet by late 1943, committing $256,000 toward Parsons' solid-fuel type. Despite this drastically increased demand, the company continued to operate informally and remained intertwined with the GALCIT project. Caltech astronomer Fritz Zwicky was brought in as head of the company's research department.

== See also ==
- Black powder rocket motor
- Bureau of Aeronautics
- Robert H. Goddard
- History of rockets
- Jet propulsion
- Liquid-propellant rocket
- Martin Summerfield
- Rocket engine
- Solid-propellant rocket
- Soviet rocketry
- Wernher von Braun
- Zero-length launch
