= Parsons (crater) =

Crater on the Moon

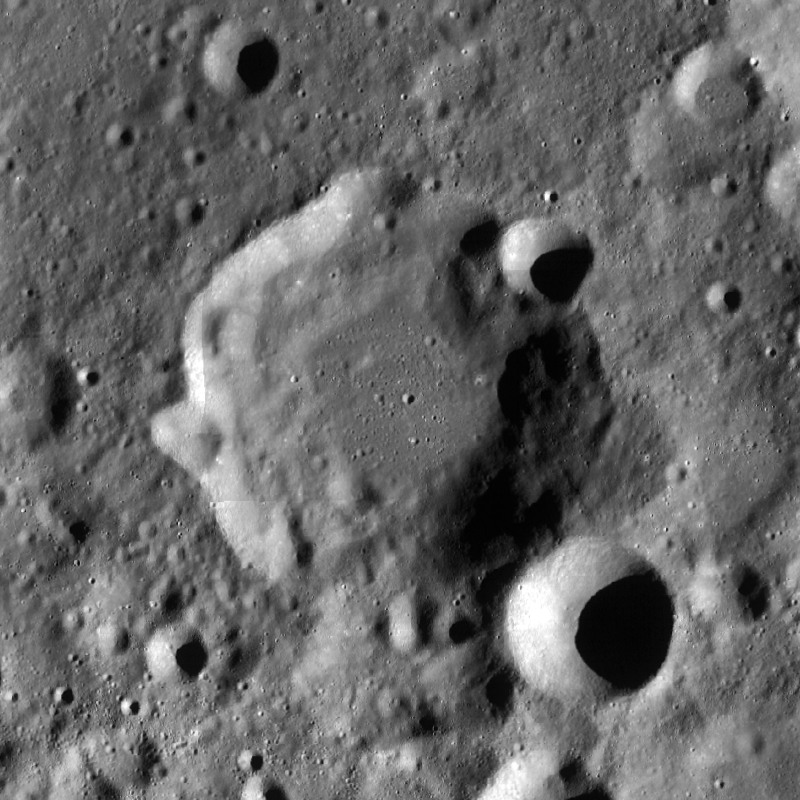
- LRO WAC mosaic
- Coordinates: 37.3°N 171.2°W
- Diameter: 40 km
- Depth: Unknown
- Colongitude: 171° at sunrise
- Eponym: John W. Parsons

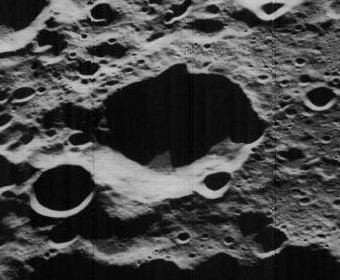
Oblique Lunar Orbiter 5 image, facing west

Parsons is an impact crater on the battered far side of the Moon. It is located to the west-northwest of the crater Krylov, and to the east of Moore. Parsons is roughly circular in shape and the rim has undergone some erosion. There is a smaller, cup-shaped crater laid across the southeastern rim, and small craterlets along the northeastern and western rim edges. The interior is relatively featureless, with a floor that is about half the diameter of the crater.

The International Astronomical Union named this crater in 1972 after the rocket engineer and occultist Jack Parsons, an important participant at the Jet Propulsion Laboratory in Pasadena, California.

== Satellite craters ==
By convention these features are identified on lunar maps by placing the letter on the side of the crater midpoint that is closest to Parsons.

Parsons	Latitude	Longitude	Diameter
D	38.5° N	168.6° W	54 km
E	37.6° N	167.8° W	26 km
L	33.6° N	170.0° W	31 km
M	33.8° N	171.7° W	23 km
N	34.2° N	173.2° W	43 km
P	35.2° N	172.8° W	28 km
