= Jolan Chang =

Canadian sexologist and Taoist philosopher

- Traditional Chinese: 張忠蘭
- Simplified Chinese: 张忠兰
Transcriptions
Standard Mandarin
- Hanyu Pinyin: Zhāng Zhōnglán

Jolan Chang (9 December 1917 – 25 April 2002) was a Canadian sexologist and Taoist philosopher who wrote the luminary classics on Eastern Sexuality The Tao of Love and Sex and The Tao of the Loving Couple. He was born in Hangzhou as the son of an army general. After the revolution he lived for a number of years in Canada, but later he moved to Sweden. He died in Stockholm.

British author Lawrence Durrell wrote about Chang in his 1980 book A smile in the Mind's Eye.

The Tao of Love and Sex (with foreword and postscript by Joseph Needham) interprets ancient Taoist sexual teachings into a modern model of sexuality. Beginning with a background of Tao and yin/yang, the book then goes into the following subjects: the role of women in sex, the importance of sexuality to health, ejaculation control, thrusting methods, descriptions of various sex positions, advantages of female superior positions, erotic kissing and the Tao, overcoming impotence, the importance of female satisfaction, longevity in relation to sexual health, benefits of age differences between sexual partners and breathing exercises. The book demonstrated that the principles of ancient Taoist texts are applicable to stimulating and improving sexual health today.

== Works ==
- The Tao of Love and Sex: The Ancient Chinese Way to Ecstasy. New York : Dutton, 1977, ISBN 0-525-47453-6
  - Note de lecture at sexologie-magazine.com
- The Tao of the Loving Couple : True Liberation Through the Tao. New York : Dutton, 1983, ISBN 0-525-24183-3 (Excerpts)
- The Food of Love and Sex : The Tao of Loving, Living and Eating. Rockport : Element Books, 1995, ISBN 1-85230-635-1
- with Sam Thornely: Zest for Life: Live Disease-free with the Tao. Stockholm : Dao Press, 1995, ISBN 91-972563-0-7

== Literature ==
- Lawrence Durrell: A smile in the mind's eye. London : Wildwood House, 1980, ISBN 0-7045-3045-7
