= Elmina D. Slenker =

American author and sex reformer

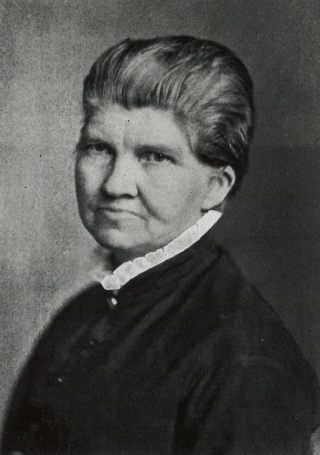
19th-century American Freethought leader and early sex reformer Elmina Drake Slenker was a regular contributor to Lucifer the Lightbearer and an early promoter of Dianism.

Elmina Drake Slenker (born Elizabeth Drake, December 23, 1827 – February 1, 1908) was a 19th-century American author, leader in the Freethought movement, and early sex reformer. A regular contributor to anarchist journal Lucifer the Lightbearer, Slinker advocated a sexual practice called Dianism. In 1887, Slenker was arrested for violating the Comstock laws which criminalized use of the US postal service to deliver sexually explicit content. She was jailed for several months, subjected to jury trial, and found guilty before finally being freed on a technicality.

== Early life ==
On December 23, 1827, Elizabeth Drake was born to Quaker parents in La Grange, New York. Her father, Thomas Drake, was a preacher who had been expelled for heresy. She was the oldest of six girls. Elmina was active in the Temperance movement.

She was an atheist. In 1866, she published a series of articles in the Boston Investigator about parts of the Bible she found improbable or objectionable. In 1870, these articles were published in book form under the title Studying The Bible: or, Brief Criticisms on Some of the Principal Scripture Texts.

Seeking marriage, at age 26, Elmina placed an advertisement for a husband in the Water-Cure Journal. The ad received over sixty responses, one of whom, Isaac Slenker, she married in 1856.

Slenker was an editor of the Water-Cure Journal and a contributor to Free Love Journal.

Slenker frequently signed her letters "Aunt Elmina".

== Criminal obscenity charges ==
In April 1887, Slenker was arrested for violating the Comstock Act, she spent 6 months in jail. Slenker was indicted on July 12, 1887. In October, she was the defendant in a criminal trial by jury. Astronomer and Dianism advocate Henry M. Parkhurst briefly testified in Slenker's defense. Found guilty, she was freed on a technicality by a judge on November 4, 1887.

== Dianism ==
In December 1889, Slenker promoted Dianism in Ezra Heywood's journal Word. From 1889 to 1897, Slenker continued her campaign promoting Dianism in the pages of publications like Lucifer the Lightbearer. Slenker advised her readers to "conserve the life forces and not needlessly waste them in mere 'paroxysms of pleasure'. She described herself as a "Dianist free lover".

== Later life ==
From 1892 to 1898, Slenker published The Little Freethinker, a children's magazine. Slenker authored The Infidel School-Teacher and The Darwins. Slenker is often cited as the author of "The Clergyman's Victims" (1881), although she did not author it but merely advertised it. Slenker sat for a spirit photography session. In 1894, Slenker proposed establishing a 'correspondence bureau' for sex radicals.

Slenker died on February 1, 1908.

== Works ==
- Studying the Bible (1870)
- The Infidel School-Teacher (1883)
- The Darwins: A Domestic Radical Romance (1879)
- "Dianism", in Lucifer the Lightbearer of April 14, 1897
