= Dianism =

Sexual practice

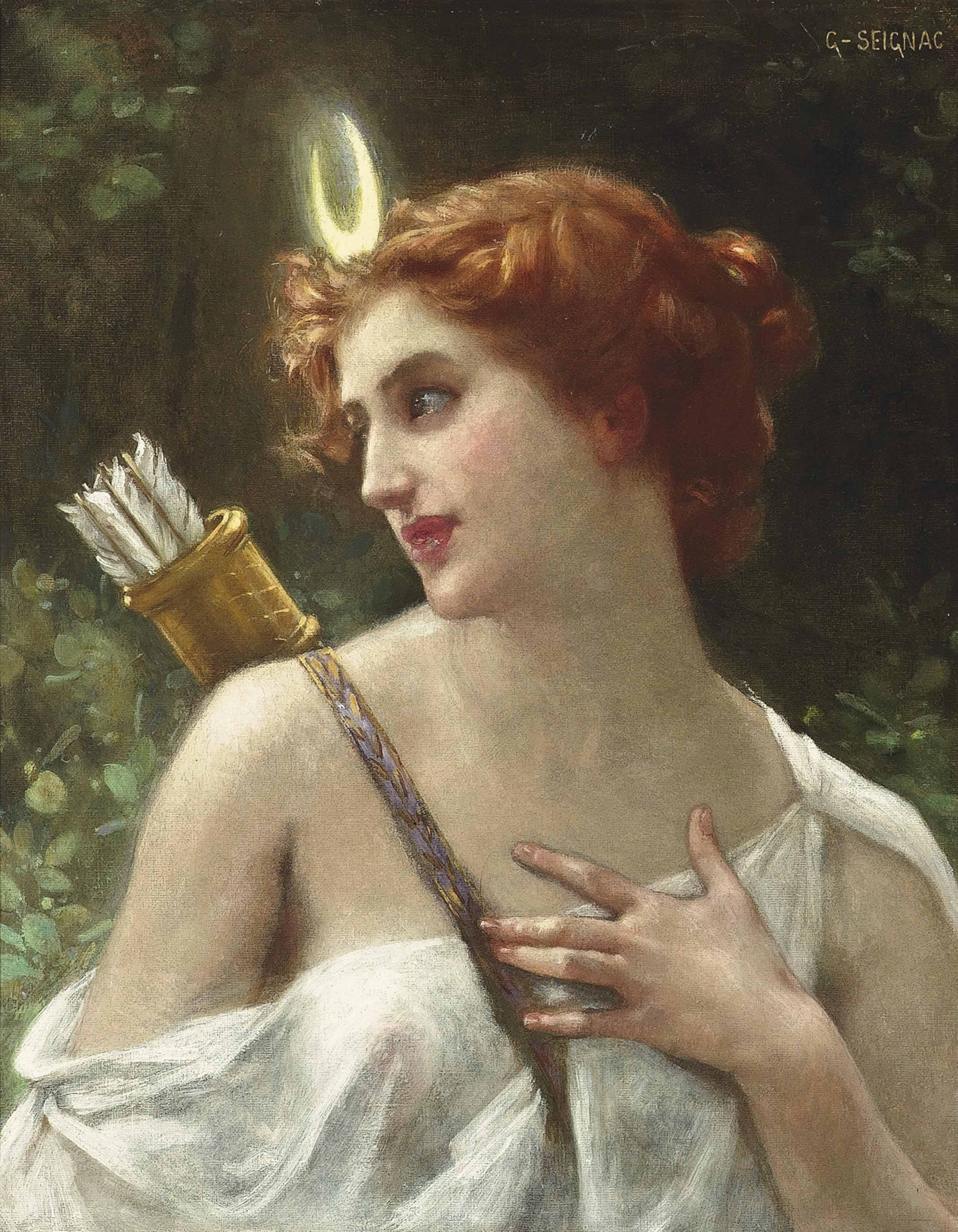
19th-century painting of the Roman goddess Diana by Guillaume Seignac

Dianism is a 19th-century American spiritual sexual practice consisting of "sexual satisfaction from sexual contact" but without ejaculation. The practice was named after Diana, the Roman goddess of chastity, by American court reporter and astronomer Henry M. Parkhurst in his 1882 pamphlet Diana. In the 1890s, sexual mystic Ida Craddock included Dianism as part of her teachings. In the 20th century, the practice found favor with American followers of Aleister Crowley, most notably C. F. Russell.

== Henry M. Parkhurst ==
Henry M. Parkhurst (March 1, 1825 - January 21, 1908) was an American stenographer who served as Chief Official Court Reporter for the US Senate, an astronomer with pioneering work in photometry, and an author.

In 1882, Henry M. Parkhurst anonymously published "Diana: A psycho-fyziological essay on sexual relations, for married men and women". The pamphlet was promoted by fellow stenographer Eliza Boardman Burnz, who authored a "Letter to parents and instructors" included in the pamphlet. Later editions also included a review by Leo Tolstoy. The pamphlet was written in "reform spelling". Parkhurst named his practice after the goddess of chastity.

While Parkhurst drew inspiration from radical religious philosopher John Humphrey Noyes, Dianism is "radically different" from Noyes's "male continence" or Alice Bunker Stockham's "karezza".

Parkhurst later took credit for the pamphlet, authoring the 1887 work "Why I Wrote 'Diana'".

== Elmina Slenker ==
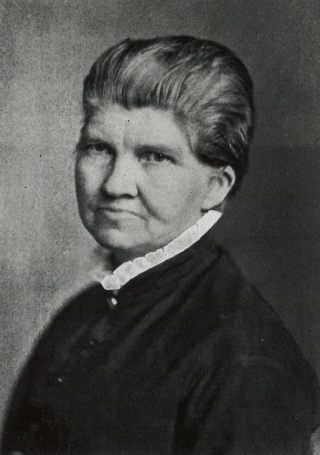
19th-century American Freethought leader and early sex reformer Elmina Drake Slenker was a regular contributor to Lucifer the Lightbearer and an early promoter of Dianism.

Elmina Slenker was a "prominent promoter of the 'Diana method' of continence and distributor of the pamphlet Diana which explained to readers how to practice sexual expression without fears of conception".

Slenker described herself as "Dianist free lover" and advised her readers to "conserve the life forces and not needlessly waste them in mere 'paroxysms of pleasure'".

In April 1887, Slenker was arrested under the Comstock Act for sending sex-advice through the mail. On November 4, 1887, Slenker was freed by a judge. Parkhurst briefly took the stand in her defense at her trial.

== Ida Craddock ==
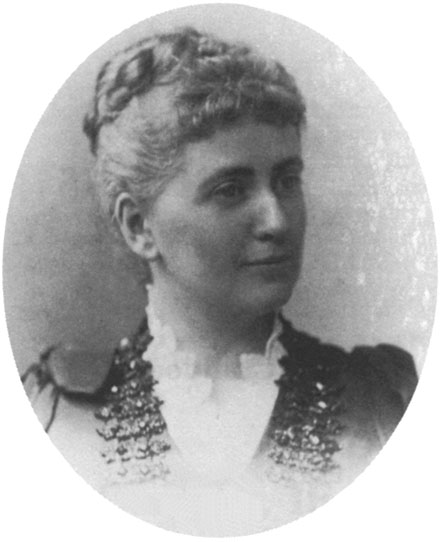
Occultist and sex reformer Ida Craddock

Ida Craddock (August 1, 1857 – October 16, 1902) was a 19th-century American occultist, Theosophist, and author, sex reformer and mystic.

Craddock developed an interest in the occult through her association with the Theosophical Society beginning around 1887. She tried in her writings to synthesize translated mystic literature and traditions from many cultures into a scholarly, distilled whole. Craddock became a student of religious eroticism and declared herself a Priestess and Pastor of the Church of Yoga. Never married, Craddock eventually claimed to have a blissful ongoing marital relationship with an angel named Soph. Craddock even stated that her intercourse with Soph was so noisy as to draw complaints from her neighbors. Her mother responded by threatening to burn Craddock's papers and unsuccessfully tried to have her institutionalized.

In Chicago, Craddock opened an office offering "mystical" sexual counseling to married couples via both walk-in counseling and mail order. She dedicated herself to “preventing sexual evils and sufferings” by educating adults.

In 1894, Craddock authored "Heavenly Bridegrooms", in which she described her sexual relationship with a spiritual being she called Soph. In 1899, she authored "Psychic Wedlock", which provided further detail on her spiritual worldview and recommended training.

=== Craddock's three planes ===
Craddock cites New Thought leader Alma Gillen, a London teacher of "Divine Healing" (also called "Divine Science"), who divides the universe into three 'factors':

1. The Thinker (that which thinks);
2. The mentality, "where thoughts are shaped"; and
3. "the body, the material life, where spirit finds expression as outward form." Craddock explains that "it is incorrect to say 'I *have* spirit.' We should say 'I *am* a spirit'".

Craddock argues that "every act ... consists of three stages." which she illustrates by stating: "Let us suppose a man:

1. conceives the idea of pushing a ball out of his path;
2. he determines how the ball shall be pushed aside, with hand or foot, gently or powerfully, etc.;
3. at the command of his mentality, his body performs the act of moving the ball."

=== Craddock's three degrees of training ===
Craddock refers to the first degree, known as "Alpha-ism", which she defines as "No sex union except for the distinct purpose of begetting a child". Craddock emphasized the importance of Alpha-ism during pregnancy, claiming that "Modern researchers have shown the impressionability of the embryo child during gestation" and that "Napoleon the Great owed his remarkable military genius to the fact that, prior to his birth, his mother accompanied her husband through a military campaign."

After mastering Alpha-ism, Craddock's suggests readers consult Parkhurt's pamphlet "Diana" as an introduction to the second degree, which is "the most difficult of the three degrees to acquire, physiologically speaking, inasmuch as it exacts supreme self-control at a crucial moment." But Craddock promises that "as the power of self-control is developed, it becomes and more possible for a man to do here just what he wills. And no man who has once acquired this power will ever care to return to the old habit of abandonment to passion; for he will see that he was then a slave, whereas now he is a king".

Craddock writes that: "There is a belief among some occultists that an earnest wish breathed at that time, when husband and wife are one, will not fail to be granted. This opens, it is said, the door to those who practice what is called 'black magic', and enables them to work harm upon other human beings." Craddock continues: "What foundation there is for this belief as applied to the magicians I do not see. If it really be that a wish is granted then more readily than when the seeker is in any other mood, it is probably because the occultist who attains the second degree has to exercise such supreme self-control at that moment that he is complete master of his sub-consciousness".

According to Craddock the "Third and Highest Degree", involves "Communion with Deity as the third partner in marital union".

== In Thelema ==
In 1915, American author Theodore Schroeder published Ida Craddock's Heavenly Bridegrooms, along with a brief introduction, in the pages of the journal The Alienist and Neurologist. Schroeder was an associate of occultist Aleister Crowley, and introduced Craddock's work to Crowley. In 1919, Crowley reviewed Heavenly Bridegrooms in the pages of the journal The Equinox, stating that it was:

...one of the most remarkable human documents ever produced, and it should certainly find a regular publisher in book form. The authoress of the MS. claims that she was the wife of an angel. She expounds at the greatest length the philosophy connected with this thesis. Her learning is enormous. ...This book is of incalculable value to every student of occult matters. No Magick library is complete without it.

Schroeder was subsequently contacted by notable Crowley followers including British Columbia O.T.O. lodge founder Charles Stansfeld Jones and Crowley's New York based representative Karl Germer.

In 1932, Crowley-associate American C. F. Russell founded his own occult group, the GBG. Russell developed his own curriculum of sex magick. GBG disciple Louis T. Culling later published this information in two works entitled The Complete Magickal Curriculum of the Secret Order G.'.B.'.G.'. and Sex Magick. The first two degrees are "Alphaism and Dianism". Culling writes that Dianism is "sexual congress without bringing it to climax" and that each participant is to regard their partner not as a "known earthly personality" but as a "visible manifestation of one's Holy Guardian Angel. After his involvement with the GBG, in 1938, Culling joined the Agape Lodge, the Southern California chapter of the O.T.O. Dianism was also promoted by 1960s-1970s spiritual leader Father Yod as part of his New Age organization called "The Source Family".

In 1981, Marcelo Ramos Motta, a student of Karl Germer who founded the Society Ordo Templi Orientis in Brazil, re-published Heavenly Bridegrooms and Psychic Wedlock.

== See also ==
- Coitus reservatus, a secular sexual practice similar to Dianism
- Huanjing bunao, a Daoist sexual practice and yangsheng ("nourishing life") method
