= Henry M. Parkhurst =

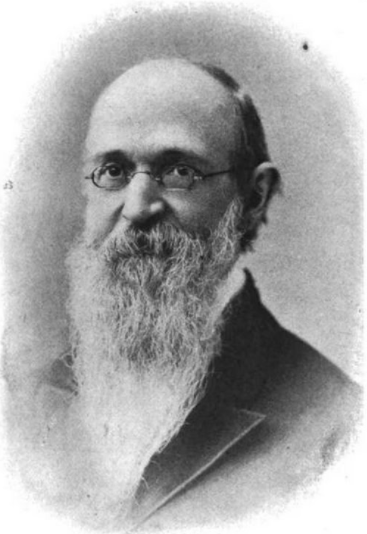
- Born: Henry Martyn Parkhurst; March 1, 1825
- Died: January 21, 1908 (aged 82)
- Occupations: Stenographer; astronomer; author
- Father: John L. Parkhurst
- Relatives: Charles Henry Parkhurst (cousin)

Henry Martyn Parkhurst (March 1, 1825 - January 21, 1908) was an American stenographer who served as Chief Official Court Reporter for the US Senate, an astronomer with pioneering work in Photometry, and an author. Parkhurst was an advocate of "Dianism".

== Early life ==
Henry M. Parkhurst was born on March 1, 1825, to Rev. John L. Parkhurst. His cousin was Rev. Dr. Charles Henry Parkhurst.

== Stenographer ==
While typical stenographers record the words spoken, Parkhurst became a "phonographic recorder", writing not the words but rather the sounds which were spoken. Parkhurst devised a modification of Pittman's phonography which Parkhurst called "Stenophonography". An advocate for spelling reform, Parkhurst published The Plowshare for forty years, using a special alphabet "in which each character stood for a single sound and each sound was represented by a single character."

In 1847, he served as reporter for the Female Anti-Slavery Society of Salem. From 1848 to 1854, Parkhurst was the Chief Official Court Reporter for the US Senate.

== Astronomy ==
At a young age, Parkhurst observed the Great Comet of 1843. In the 1870s, he published a journal article describing a new photometric mapping device that could record the location and magnitude of stars. In 1893, ten years of his observations were published in the Harvard Annals. From 1883 to 1907, he conducted research into long period variable stars. Beginning in 1887, he conducted a survey of asteroids.

== Paranormal investigator ==
In 1867, Parkhurst investigated purported-clairvoyant Mollie Fancher, and after which he wrote multiple statements attesting to her abilities. In 1878, Parkhurt publicly attested to Fancher's abilities in a letter to the editor of the New York Herald.

== Dianism ==
In 1887, Henry M. Parkhurst anonymously published 'Diana', a pamphlet that taught the practice of Dianaism. The pamphlet was written in "reform spelling". Parkhurst named his practice after the goddess of chastity. Parkhurst drew inspiration from radical religious philosopher John Humphrey Noyes.

Parkhurt later took credit for the pamphlet, authoring "Why I Wrote 'Diana'".

Elmina Slenker was a "prominent promoter of the 'Diana method' of continence and distributor of the pamphlet Diana which explained to readers how to practice sexual expression without fears of conception". She was arrested under obscenity laws. Parkhurst briefly took the stand in her defense at her trial.

== Influence ==
Sex reformer Ida Craddock advised study of "Alpha-ism" and Dianism "Diana", a pamphlet by "Prof. Parkhurst, the astronomer, and published by the Burnz Publishing Co., New York".

In 1908, Parkhust died. That year, an in-depth profile of Parkhurst was published in Popular Astronomy, penned by Yerkes Observatory astronomer John Adelbert Parkhurst (no relation).

== Works ==
- Proceedings of the Anti-Sabbath Convention : held in the Melodeon, March 23d and 24th / (Boston : Published by order of the convention, 1848)
- The stenophonographer. Upon the basis of Pitman's phonography, with the circular vowel scale of July, 1851. (New York : H.M. Parkhurst, 1870)
