= Eliza Boardman Burnz =

American shorthand inventor and promoter

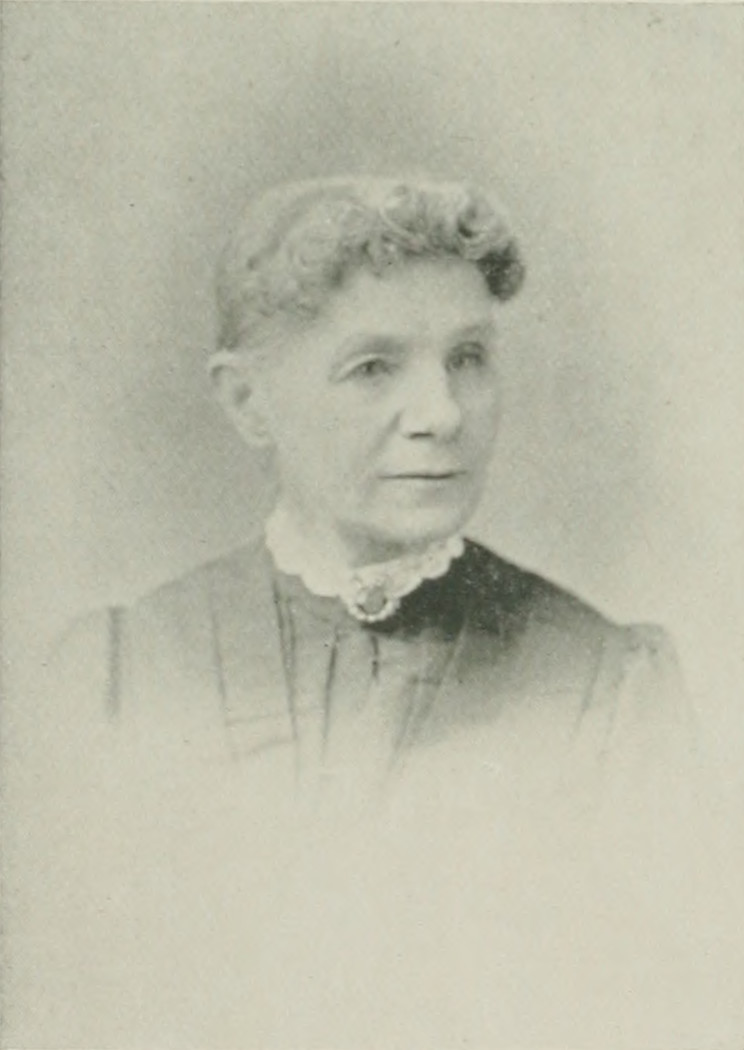
- Born: 31 October 1823; Essex, England
- Died: 19 June 1903 (aged 79); Reading, Pennsylvania
- Occupations: Inventor, educator

Eliza Boardman Burnz (31 October 1823 - 19 June 1903) was a nineteenth century American shorthand inventor and promoter. Her simplified alphabet, arranged in the basis of Isaac Pitman's Phonography, was the subject of Mark Twain's essay A Simplified Alphabet.

== Biography ==
She was born Eliza Boardman in Essex, England; her parents were John Boardman and Anna Thomason. She moved with her family to the United States in 1837. She was married twice and had four children.

As a librarian and the "mother" of women stenographers, Burnz championed spelling reform and founded the Burnz' Fonic Shorthand in 1869. Burnz claimed no originality in its method, as it was based on Isaac Pitman's method, which she had become familiar with in 1846. The Burnz system's best feature was its ability to enable the writer to write with legibility and speed. In 1872, she began teaching shorthand at Cooper Union and the Young Women's Christian Association.

Burnz was a suffragist and promoted Dianism, a sexual practice which permits sexual contact without ejaculation.

Burnz died 19 June 1903 at Walters Park Sanitarium near Reading, Pennsylvania.

== Bibliography ==
- Burnz' phonic shorthand, for schools, business writing and reporting. Arranged on the basis of Isaac Pitman's "Phonography".
- Pure phonics for home and kindergarten; short essays which present the need and method of teaching the elementary sounds of the English language to children before they are taught to read script or print
