= Taoist sexual practices =

Religious sexual practices

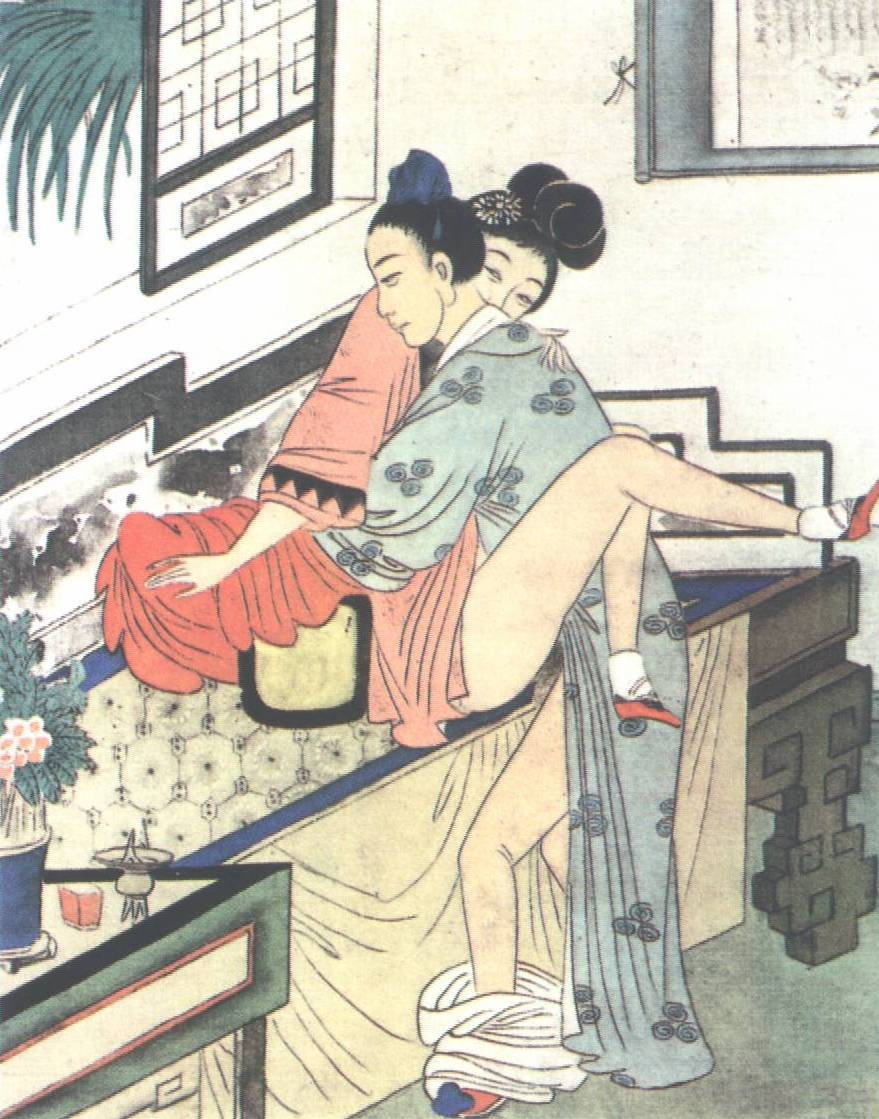
A Chinese print depicting "The Joining of the Essences", based on Tang Dynasty art

Taoist sexual practices (traditional Chinese: 房中術; simplified Chinese: 房中术; pinyin: fángzhōngshù; lit. 'arts of the bedchamber') are the ways Taoists may practice sexual activity. These practices are also known as "joining energy" or "the joining of the essences". Practitioners believe that by performing these sexual arts, one can stay in good health, and attain longevity or spiritual advancement. These arts are not practiced by all Taoist sects, and are sometimes looked down upon. There is also not one system, existing in many forms throughout the centuries.

== History ==
Some Taoist sects during the Han dynasty performed sexual intercourse as a spiritual practice, called héqì (traditional Chinese: 合氣; simplified Chinese: 合气; pinyin: Hé qì). The earliest sexual texts that survive today are those found at Mawangdui. While Taoism had not yet fully evolved as a philosophy at this time, these texts shared some remarkable similarities with later Tang dynasty texts, such as the Ishinpō (traditional Chinese: 醫心方; simplified Chinese: 医心方; pinyin: Yī xīn fāng). The sexual arts arguably reached their climax between the end of the Han dynasty and the end of the Tang dynasty.

After AD 1000, Confucian restraining attitudes towards sexuality became stronger, so that by the beginning of the Qing dynasty in 1644, sex was a taboo topic in public life. These Confucians alleged that the separation of genders in most social activities existed 2,000 years ago and suppressed the sexual arts. Because of the taboo surrounding sex, there was much censoring done during the Qing in literature, and the sexual arts disappeared in public life. As a result, some of the texts survived only in Japan, and most scholars had no idea that such a different concept of sex existed in early China.

== Ancient and medieval practices ==
=== Qi (life force) and jing (essence) ===
The basis of much Taoist thinking is that qi (traditional Chinese: 氣; simplified Chinese: 气) is part of everything in existence. Qi is related to another energetic substance contained in the human body known as jing (精), and once all this has been expended the body dies. Jing can be lost in many ways, but most notably through the loss of body fluids. Taoists may use practices to stimulate/increase and conserve their bodily fluids to great extents. The fluid believed to contain the most jing is semen. Therefore, some Taoists believe in decreasing the frequency of, or totally avoiding, ejaculation in order to conserve life essence.

=== Male control of ejaculation ===
Many Taoist practitioners link the loss of ejaculatory fluids to the loss of vital life force: where excessive fluid loss results in premature aging, disease, and general fatigue. While some Taoists contend that one should never ejaculate, others provide a specific formula to determine the maximum number of regular ejaculations in order to maintain health.

The general idea is to limit the loss of fluids as much as possible to the level of your desired practice. As these sexual practices were passed down over the centuries, some practitioners have given less importance to the limiting of ejaculation. This variety has been described as "...while some declare non-ejaculation injurious, others condemn ejaculating too fast in too much haste." Nevertheless, retention of the semen is one of the foundational tenets of Taoist sexual practice.

There are different methods to control ejaculation prescribed by the Taoists. In order to avoid ejaculation, the man could do one of several things. He could pull out immediately before orgasm, a method also more recently termed as "coitus conservatus." A second method involved the man applying pressure on the perineum, thus retaining the sperm. While if done incorrectly this can cause retrograde ejaculation, the Taoists believed that the jing traveled up into the head and "nourished the brain." Cunnilingus was believed to be ideal by preventing the loss of semen and vaginal liquids.

=== Practice control ===
Another important concept of "the joining of the essences" was that the union of a man and a woman would result in the creation of jing, a type of sexual energy. When in the act of lovemaking, jing would form, and the man could transform some of this jing into qi, and therefore replenish his lifeforce. By having as much sex as possible, men had the opportunity to transform more and more jing, and as a result would see many health benefits.

=== Yin and yang ===
The concept of yin and yang is important in Taoism and consequently also holds special importance in sex. Yang usually referred to the male sex, whereas yin could refer to the female sex. Man and woman were the equivalent of heaven and earth, but became disconnected. Therefore, while heaven and earth are eternal, man and woman suffer a premature death. Every interaction between yin and yang had significance. Because of this significance, every position and action in lovemaking had importance. Taoist texts described a large number of special sexual positions that served to cure or prevent illness, similar to the Kama Sutra.

There was the notion that men released yang during orgasm, while women shed yin during theirs. Every orgasm from the user would nourish the partner's energy. Since underage males were considered to have yin energy in their bodies, a condition similar to that in females, homosexual acts with them were believed to align with this fundamental principles. Sexual relations between two adult men, however, were considered to lead to an excess of yang energy.

=== Women ===
For Taoists, sex was not just about pleasing a man. The woman also had to be stimulated and pleased in order to benefit from the act of sex. Sunü (素女; Sù nǚ), female advisor to the Yellow Emperor Huangdi (traditional Chinese: 黃帝; simplified Chinese: 黄帝; pinyin: Huángdì), noted ten important indications of female satisfaction. If sex were performed in this manner, the woman would create more jing, and the man could more easily absorb the jing to increase his own qi.

According to Jolan Chang, in early Chinese history, women played a significant role in the Tao (道; Dào) of loving, and that the degeneration into subordinate roles came much later in Chinese history. Women were also given a prominent place in the Ishinpō, with the tutor being a woman. One of the reasons women had a great deal of strength in the act of sex was that they walked away undiminished from the act. The woman had the power to bring forth life, and did not have to worry about ejaculation or refractory period. To quote Laozi from the Tao Te Ching: "The Spirit of the Valley is inexhaustible... Draw on it as you will, it never run dry."

Many of the ancient texts were dedicated explanations of how a man could use sex to extend his own life, but his life was extended only through the absorption of the woman's vital energies (jing and qi). Some Taoists came to call the act of sex "the battle of stealing and strengthening". These sexual methods could be correlated with Taoist military methods. Instead of storming the gates, the battle was a series of feints and maneuvers that would sap the enemy's resistance. Fang described this battle as "the ideal was for a man to 'defeat' the 'enemy' in the sexual 'battle' by keeping himself under complete control so as not to emit semen, while at the same time exciting the woman until she reached orgasm and shed her Yin essence, which was then absorbed by the man."

Jolan Chang points out that it was after the Tang dynasty (AD 618–906) that "the Tao of Loving" was "steadily corrupted", and that it was these later corruptions that reflected battle imagery and elements of a "vampire" mindset. Other research into early Taoism found more harmonious attitudes of yin-yang communion.

=== Multiple partners ===
This practice was not limited to male on female, however, as it was possible for women to do the same in turn with the male yang. The deity known as the Queen Mother of the West was described to have no husband, instead having intercourse with young virgin males to nourish her female element.

=== Age of partners ===
Some Ming dynasty Taoist texts believed that one way for men to achieve longevity or 'towards immortality' is by having intercourse with virgins, particularly young virgins. Taoist sexual books by Liangpi and Sanfeng call the female partner ding (鼎) and recommend sex with premenarche virgins.

Liangpi concludes that the ideal ding is a pre-menarche virgin just under 14 years of age and women older than 18 should be avoided. Sanfeng went further and divided ding partners into three ranks of descending importance: premenarche virgins aged 14–16, menstruating virgins aged 16–20 and women aged 21–25.

As unfamiliar as this may appear to modern readers, the Ming legal code permitted women to marry from the age of 14 and men from 16 (traditional Chinese: 男年十六，女年十四，聽婚嫁; simplified Chinese: 男年十六，女年十四，听婚嫁; pinyin: Nán nián shíliù, nǚ nián shísì, tīng hūnjià). Earlier ritual and historical sources, however, present different ideals. Texts from the Han period, drawing on classical Confucian norms, often described twenty as a more appropriate or idealized age for women's marriage. This contrast suggests that early marriage ages reflected later legal and social developments rather than a single continuous practice throughout all periods of Chinese history.

Furthermore, certain third-century Daoist monastic rulebooks explicitly prohibit practitioners from "transmitting the Dao to adolescent girls," warning that using such situations to enter the “Gate of Life” would harm their spirits and violate proper conduct (traditional Chinese: 十者：不得傳道童女，因入生門，傷神犯氣，逆惡無道; simplified Chinese: 十者：不得传道童女，因入生门，伤神犯气，逆恶无道; pinyin: Shí zhě: Bùdé chuándào tóngnǚ, yīn rù shēng mén, shāngshén fàn qì, nì è wú dào). This suggests that stricter ethical standards already existed within early Daoist communities, and that the prior mentioned practices or beliefs were not universally accepted across all sects, and in this instance such actions were viewed as "perverse and wicked, lacking the Dao" (traditional Chinese: 逆惡無道; simplified Chinese: 逆恶无道; pinyin: Nì è wú dào).

It is also unlikely either SanFeng or LiangPi wrote these books, as many Taoist books throughout history claim the names of various famous ancestors to legitimize the text.

According to Ge Hong, a 4th-century Taoist alchemist, "those seeking 'immortality' must perfect the absolute essentials. These consist of treasuring the jing, circulating the qi, and consuming the great medicine." The sexual arts concerned the first precept, treasuring the jing. This is partially because treasuring the jing involved sending it up into the brain. In order to send the jing into the brain, the male had to refrain from ejaculation during sex. According to some Taoists, if this was done, the jing would travel up the spine and nourish the brain instead of leaving the body. Ge Hong also states, however, that it is folly to believe that performing the sexual arts only can achieve immortality and some of the ancient myths on sexual arts had been misinterpreted and exaggerated. Indeed, the sexual arts had to be practiced alongside alchemy to attain longevity. Ge Hong also warned it could be dangerous if practiced incorrectly.

== See also ==
- Huanjing bunao
- Jiutian Xuannü, goddess of sexuality as well as warfare and longevity
- Sex magic
- Sexual vampire
- Tantric sex
- Yangsheng (Daoism)
