= Microcosmic orbit =

Taoist energy-cultivation technique

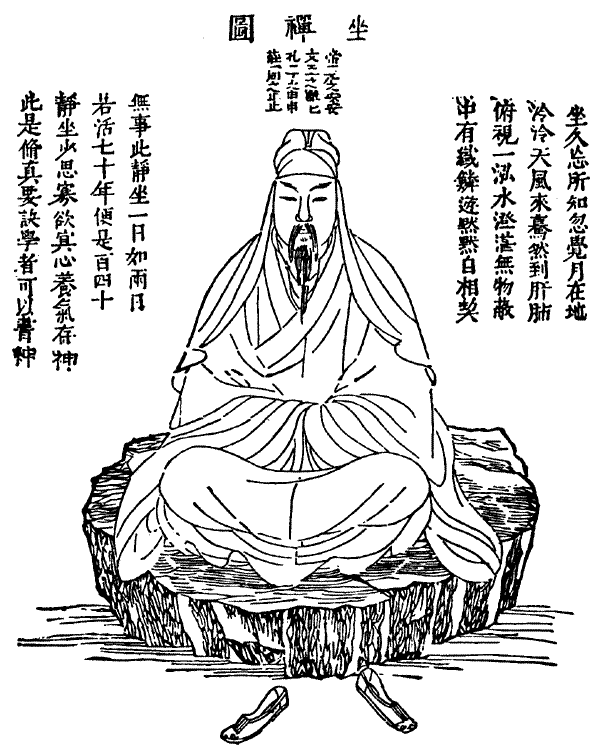
"Gathering the Light", Taoist meditation from The Secret of the Golden Flower

The microcosmic orbit (小周天), also known as the Self Winding Wheel of the Law, is a Taoist qigong energy cultivation technique. It involves deep breathing exercises in conjunction with meditation and concentration techniques which aim to develop the flow of qi along certain pathways of energy in the human body which may be familiar to those who are studying traditional Chinese medicine, qigong, tai chi, Neidan and Chinese alchemy. The exercise can be performed usually at first in a sitting position, but it can also be practiced standing as in Zhan zhuang or with movements included as with tai chi.

The understanding of the microcosmic orbit technique is relevant not only because of its historical context in the story of Chinese alchemy, but also because it is in the center of many Taoist forms of exercise.

== History ==
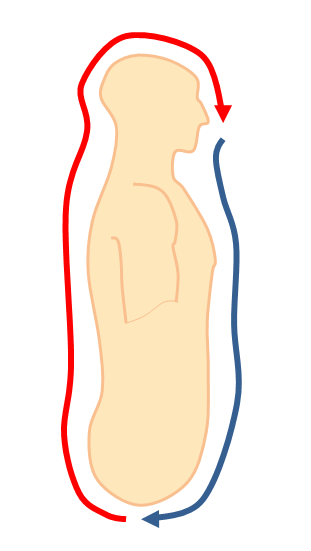
Microcosmic orbit

The history of the microcosmic orbit dates back to prehistoric times in China, and the underlying principles can be found in the I Ching which according to legend was written by the Emperor Fu Xi approximately five thousand years ago or at least two centuries before the time of the Yellow Emperor. For example, the Chinese character for the I Ching hexagram number 5, Waiting, depicts a person sitting in meditation and the commentary pertains to the flow of energy from one of the psychic energy channels to another during meditation:

The commentary on the Image for hexagram 5 reveals the entire process of meditation. "The clouds rise up to heaven" symbolizes the meditator's energy rising upward as it evaporates into the head, where it is distilled into a saliva like nectar (referred to in the phrase "the superior man eats and drinks"), which returns to the abdomen. " It furthers one to cross the great water" alludes to crossing the great water of the abdomen and mouth.

An 1886 stone carving in the White Cloud Temple in Beijing contains a pictorial representation of some of the symbols which describe the processes involved in the microcosmic orbit meditation technique. These particular techniques are derived from the Taoist Patriarch Lü Dongbin who was born in 798 AD. Lü Dongbin was one of the Eight Immortals.

Lü Dongbin and his teacher, Chung-li Ch'üan, were two of the "Eight Immortals”, pa-hsien. While a fugitive after an abortive Chinese military expedition against Tibet, Chung-li Ch'uan encountered Master Tung-hua. He "earnestly begged for the secrets of immortality. Master Tung-hua thereupon imparted to him not only an infallible magic process for attaining longevity, but also the method to produce the Philosopher's Stone."

This method was documented by Leng Qian (冷謙), a Taoist monk who lived during the late Yuan and early Ming dynasties, in his book Essentials for Cultivating Longevity (修齡要旨). His account was less detailed and referred to the practice by a different name: “The Marvelous Sixteen-Character Method for Longevity” (長生一十六字妙訣). The Qing-dynasty physician You Cheng (尤乘) later used the term “Microcosmic Orbit Method” (小週天法) in his book A Compilation for Longevity (壽世青編). He described the method as follows:

Chinese	English Translation
先將身心澄定，面東趺坐，平坐亦可。但前膝不可低，腎子不可著物。呼吸和平，以手作三昧印，掐無名指，右掌加左掌上，按於臍下。	First, settle and calm your body and mind. Sit cross-legged facing east; alternatively, sit upright on a chair. However, your knees should not be too low, and your genitals must not rest against anything. Form the Samadhi Mudra by placing your right palm over your left, resting both hands below the navel, and allowing the tips of your thumbs to touch lightly.
叩齒三十六遍，以集心神。赤龍攪海，內外三十六遍(赤龍，舌也；內外，齒內外也)。雙目隨舌轉運，舌抵上腭。靜心數息三百六十週身畢，待神水滿，漱津數遍。	Click your teeth together thirty-six times to focus the mind. Move your tongue in a full circle thirty-six times around the inside of your teeth. Then move it to the outside of your teeth, between the teeth and lips, and repeat the circular movement thirty-six times. Let your eyes follow the movement of your tongue and press the tip of your tongue against the upper palate. Quiet your mind and count 360 breaths. When your mouth is full of saliva, swish it around several times.
用四字訣(攝提穀道，舌抵上腭。目閉上視，鼻吸莫呼)，從任脈撮過穀道，到尾閭，以意運送，徐徐上夾脊、中關，漸漸速些。閉目上視，鼻吸莫呼，撞過玉枕(頭上腦後骨)，將目往前一忍，直轉崑崙(頭頂)，倒下鵲橋(舌) ，分津送下重樓，入離宮(心也)；而至氣海(臍下穴也)。略定一定，復用前法連行三次。	Apply the Four Methods: contract the perineum, press the tongue against the upper palate, close the eyes and look upward, and inhale through the nose without exhaling. Guide the Qi with your mind from the Dantian, down the front central meridian through the perineum, and onward to the tailbone. Then guide it slowly upward along the spine, gradually increasing the speed. Keep your eyes closed and directed upward, inhale through the nose and hold your breath, and thrust the Qi upward past the bone at the back of the head. Then direct your gaze forward with a slight push, guide the Qi directly over the crown of the head, and allow it to descend to the tongue. Send a portion of the saliva down through the throat, into the centre of the chest, and then down to the Dantian. Pause briefly (release the breath naturally), and repeat the above procedure three times.
口中之津，分三次嚥下，所謂天河水逆流也。靜坐片時，將手左右擦丹田一百八十下，連臍抱住。放手時，將衣被臍腹間圍住，勿令風入 (古所謂「養得丹田煖煖熱」此是神仙真妙訣) 。	Swallow the saliva in your mouth in three portions. This is known as “the Celestial River Flowing in Reverse.” Sit quietly for a short while, then rub your lower abdomen—the Dantian—to the left and right 180 times. Afterwards, place your hands around the navel. When you remove your hands, wrap clothing or a blanket around your abdomen and navel to prevent drafts from entering. As the ancients said, “Keeping the Dantian warm—this is the true secret of the Immortals.”
次將大指背擦熱，抵目十四遍，去心火；擦鼻三十六遍，潤肺；擦耳十四遍，補腎；擦面十四遍，健脾。兩手掩耳，鳴天鼓。徐徐將手往上，即朝天揖，如是者三。	Next, rub the backs of your thumbs together until they are warm, then gently rub them over your eyes fourteen times to dispel heart-fire. Rub your nose thirty-six times to moisten the lungs, your ears fourteen times to tonify the kidneys, and your face fourteen times to strengthen the spleen. Cover your ears with both palms and perform the “Heavenly Drum” technique. Slowly raise your hands as though making a celestial bow, and repeat this three times.
徐徐呼出濁氣四五口，鼻收清氣。兩手抱肩，移筋換骨數遍。擦玉枕關二十四下，擦腰眼(即腎堂)一百八下，擦足心(即湧泉)各一百八下。謂之一週。	Slowly exhale turbid air in four or five breaths, then inhale clear air through your nose. Cross your arms over your shoulders and perform the tendon- and bone-shifting movements several times. Rub the Jade Pillow Pass twenty-four times, the lower back over the kidney region 180 times, and the soles of both feet 180 times each. This completes one full routine.
久久行之，精神強旺，百病不生，長生不老。	If practised consistently over a long period, the body's vitality and spirit will become strong and vigorous, illness will not arise, and one will enjoy longevity with little aging.

== Practice ==
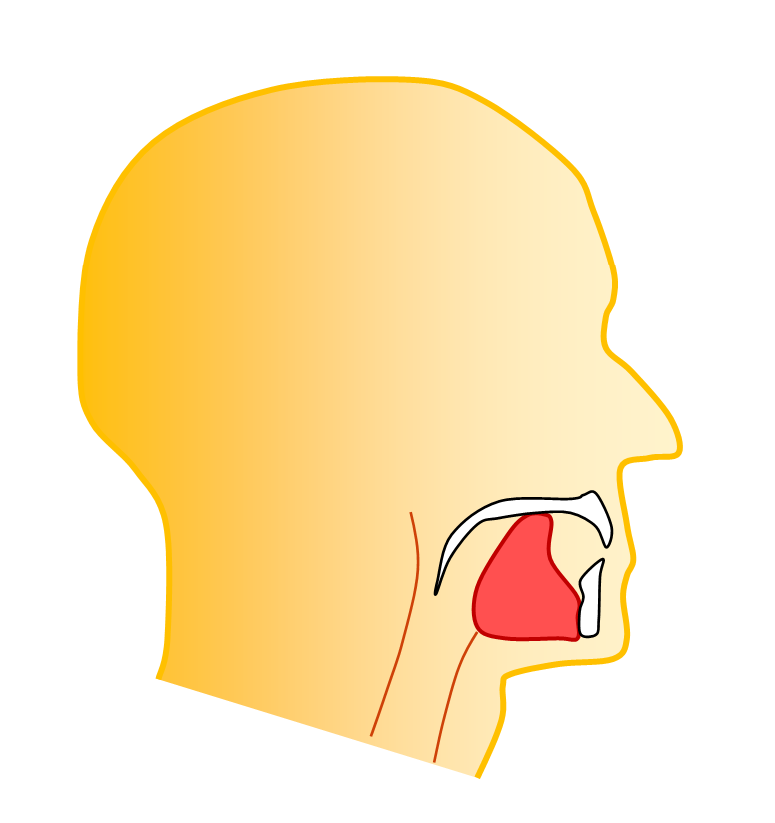
Building the bridge with the tip of the tongue touching the palate

The exercise itself usually begins with preparation designed to relax the physical body and develop the ability to concentrate. Students may indeed be encouraged to practice Taoist Yoga exercises or tai chi as a way of building enough energy to begin performing the microcosmic orbit exercise as it can induce a strain on the nervous system and cause energy depletion if practiced without adequate preparation.

To begin with the student is encouraged to develop deep abdominal breathing into the primary dantian or Taoist energy centre to develop heat and pressure in the lower abdomen or "Golden Stove". A preparatory exercise known by some as the Lesser Heavenly circulation involves moving energy between two areas known as the seat of fire near the heart or the solar plexus where a psychic centre symbolised by the trigram Li from the I Ching is located, and the seat of water in the area of the kidneys where a psychic centre symbolised by the trigram kan is located.

Normally essence or jing can flow either way through the eight extra meridians or energy pathways in the body, but in the microcosmic orbit meditation exercise jing is encouraged to flow upwards along the Governor vessel during inhalation and then downwards along the conception vessel returning to the dantian on the exhalation. This means that energy flows from the dantian downwards to the base of the spine then up the back along the centre line of the body to the crown of the head, then over the head and down the front centre line of the body and back to the starting point again making a full circle or orbit. This prevents the body's natural essences from becoming depleted as they normally flow downwards from the brain or 'sea of marrow' and are lost during ejaculation or menstruation during the reproductive processes. It is this jing or essence which is responsible for the reproductive processes in the body which allow the body to rejuvenate itself as well as for the reproductive processes which give rise to offspring. Essence is also an important component in the manufacture of qi which can be translated into English as vitality or energy, the primary motive force which is life itself. This raising and lowering Jing through the microcosmic orbit and returning it to the dantian purifies the essence and transforms it into qi or vitality.

As well as the lower dantian or cauldron there are other important points along the circuit of energy flow which include the 'three gates' which are areas where it is considered that energy may stagnate, these are the wei-lu or Tailbone gate, the Dorsal gate on the back roughly level with the heart, and the Jade pillow on the back of the head. Other important areas include the Ming Men or gate of fire on the back about level with the kidneys and the Baihui or Niwan which is directly on top of the head.

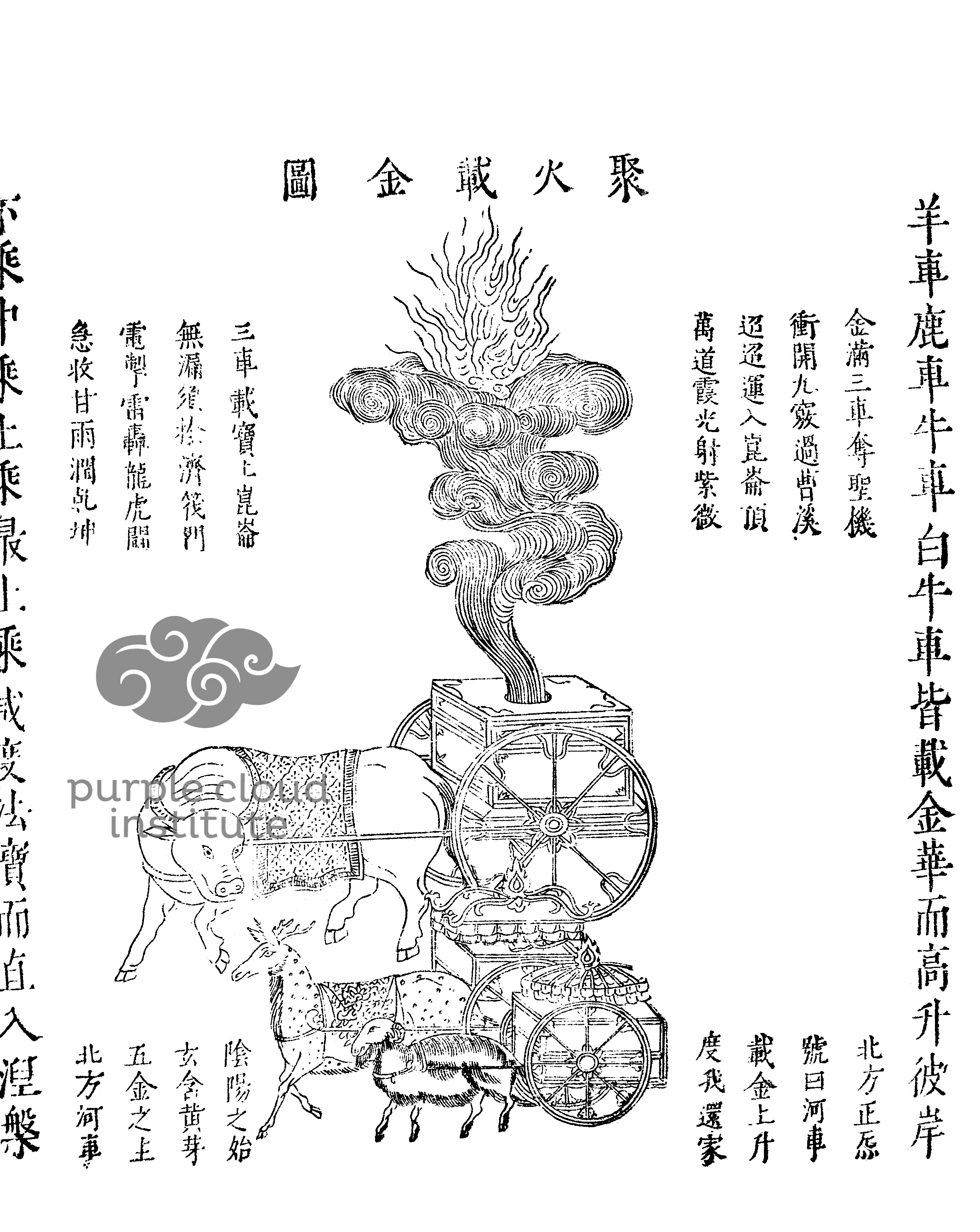
The Three Passes (sanguan 三関) of Internal Alchemy

The microcosmic orbit should be viewed in the context of a variety of Taoist exercises and techniques designed to purify the body physically, mentally and spiritually, improve health and longevity, and prepare the way for meditation, and also including other techniques such as the macrocosmic orbit which means circulating energy into the other psychic energy meridians which flow around the torso and out into the arms and legs. These types of exercises are best practiced under the guidance of suitably qualified teachers who can help the beginner avoid any pitfalls and misunderstandings along the way rather than copied from books, especially if the subject may have a history of mental illness or emotional imbalance. For example, according to Lu Kuan Yu: "It is harmful to pinpoint places in the body, the very idea of which should be relinquished since it hinders the course of the inner fire and of vitality."

== Macrocosmic Orbit ==
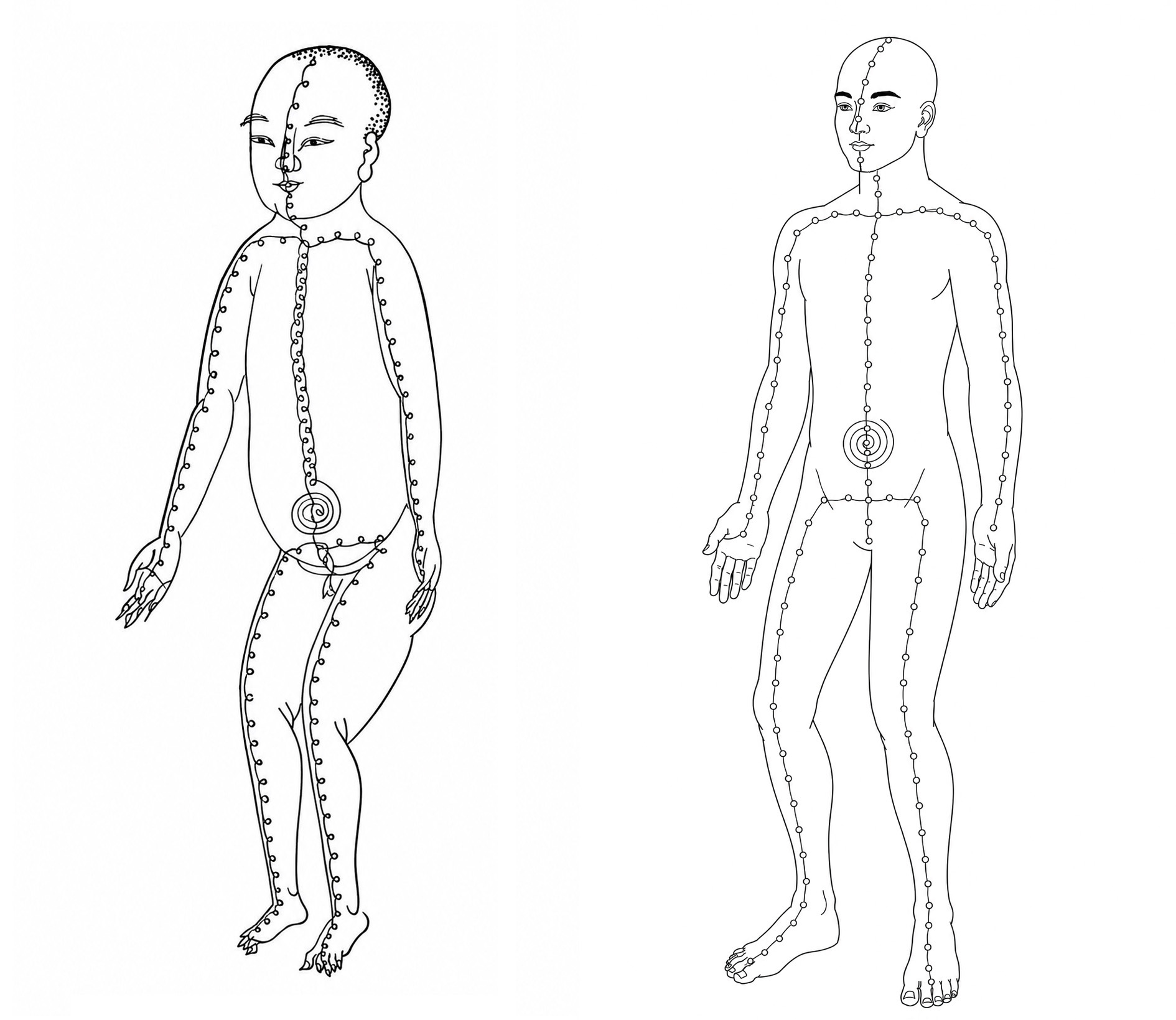
A 1632 illustration of the Macrocosmic Orbit and a modern anatomical redrawing.

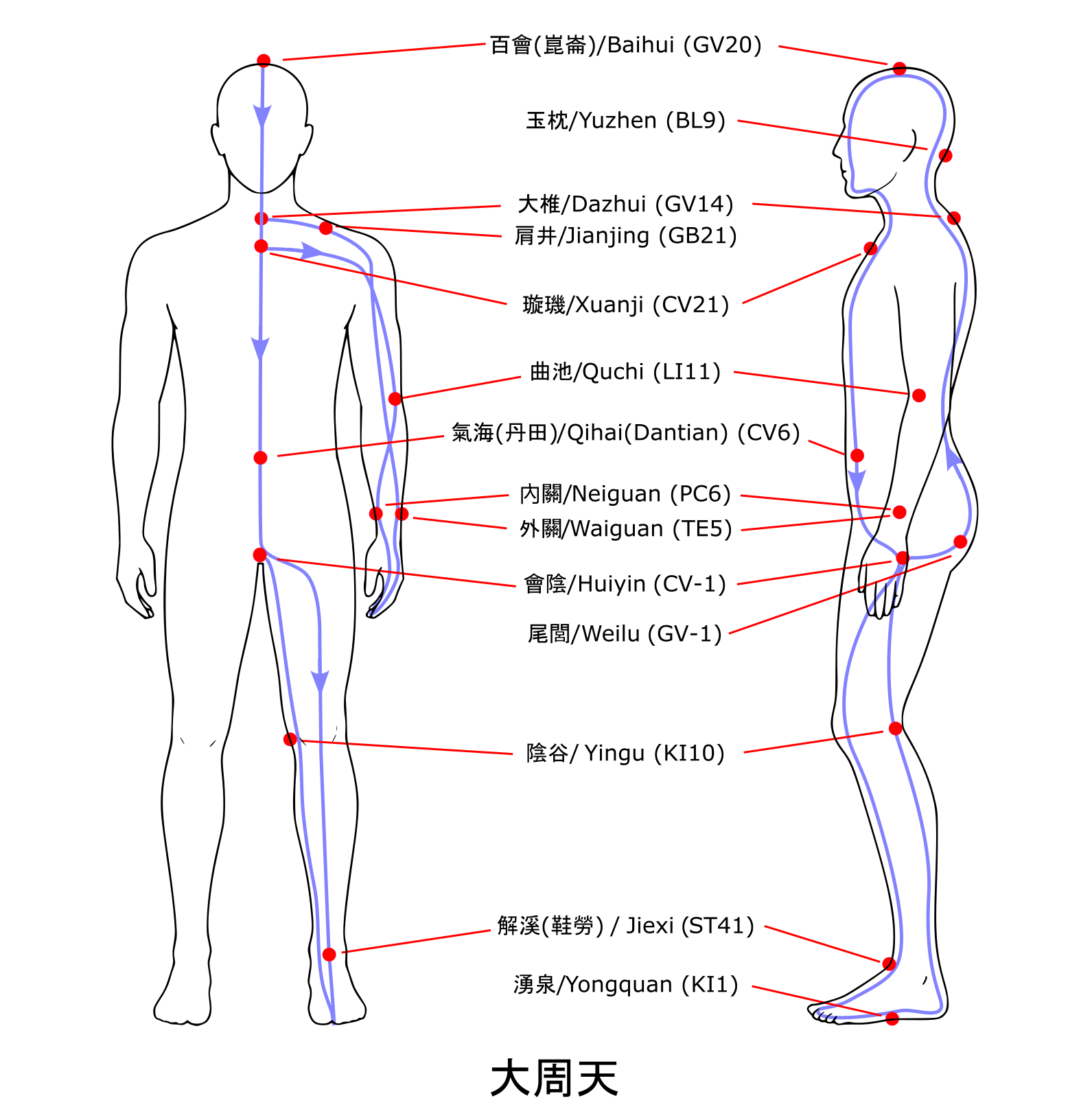
Qi Path of the Macrocosmic Orbit

When the Microcosmic Orbit method is extended to the four limbs, it is called the Macrocosmic Orbit (大周天). In 1632, the Taoist monk Cao Heng (曹珩) described the path of qi in the Macrocosmic Orbit as follows.

No.	Circuit	Qi path
1	Commencement	Stand firmly with the knees slightly bent, and centre the attention on the dantian (CV6). Circulate the qi in a small circle, gradually expand it into a large circle, and then contract it back into a small circle. Finally, focus the qi at the dantian (CV6).
2		Dantian (CV6) → Xuanji (CV21)
3	Left-arm circuit	Xuanji (CV21) → left shoulder and arm → Quchi (LI11) → Neiguan (PC6) → centre of the palm, Laogong (PC8) → fingertips → Waiguan (TE5) → back of the elbow → Jianjing (GB21) → Dazhui (GV14)
4	Ren–Du (GV–CV) circuit	Dazhui (GV14) → coccygeal gate (tailbone) → Jade Pillow → top of the head, Baihui (GV20) → Yintang (GV29) → Upper Magpie Bridge (the connection formed when the tongue touches the upper palate) → throat → Shanzhong (CV17) → navel (CV8) → dantian (CV6)
5	Right-leg circuit	Dantian (CV6) → right leg → Xiguan (LR7) → Jiexi (ST41) → dorsum of the foot → tips of the toes → Yongquan (KI1) → back of the heel → Yingu (KI10) → coccygeal gate (tailbone) → Baihui (GV20) → Yintang (GV29) → Upper Magpie Bridge → Xuanji (CV21)
6		Xuanji (CV21) → dantian (CV6)
7	Left-leg circuit	Similar to the right-leg circuit.
8	Right-arm circuit	Similar to the left-arm circuit.
9		Dazhui (GV14) → Baihui (GV20) → Xuanji (CV21)
10		Repeat from step 3 until ready to end.
11	Closing	Xuanji (CV21) → dantian (CV6). Wherever the mind guides, the qi follows (意至而氣自相隨).

The method was subsequently cited in two Qing-dynasty medical compilations.
