= Harley Hamilton =

American conductor, violinist and composer

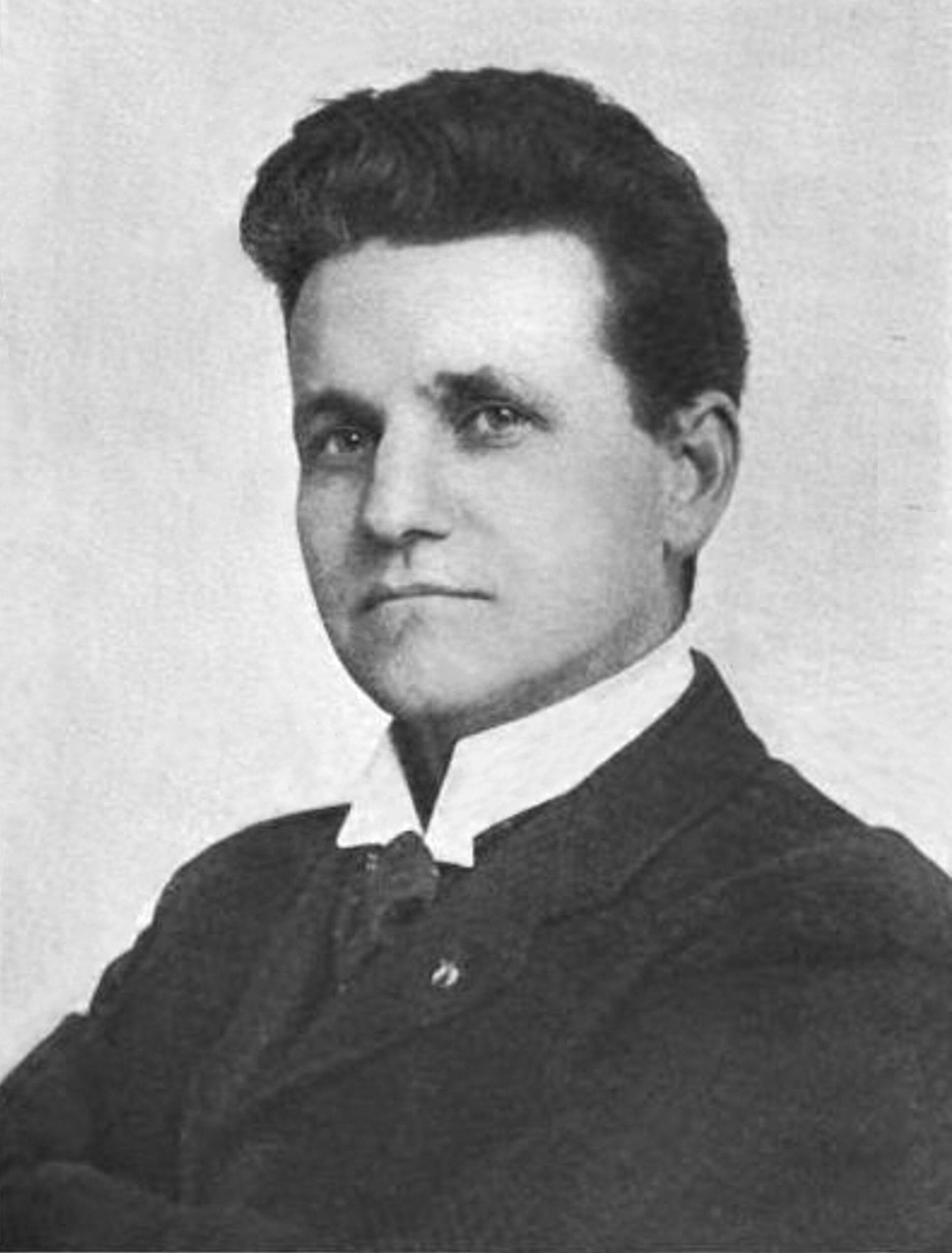
- Born: Harley Hamilton; 1861; New York, US
- Died: May 1933 (aged 71–72)
- Other name: Harley Burnham Hamilton
- Education: New York College of Music
- Occupations: Conductor, violinist and composer
- Known for: Founder and conductor of LA Symphony
- Children: Viola Hamilton Taylor

Harley Hamilton (March 8, 1861 – May 14, 1933) was an American conductor, violinist and composer. He was the founder and first conductor of the LA Women's Orchestra in 1893 and of the LA Symphony in 1897. Hamilton was one of the first symphony American directors in those years, when most conductors were born and trained abroad. (Note: death date derived from obituaries' dates)

Hamilton was born in 1861 in Kenwood, New York, to Susan C. Williams and Henry W. Burnham. He was a member of the Oneida Community in New York, which his parents joined in 1848, until the Community dissolved in 1881. Shortly before his mother's death, he was adopted by Erastus Hapgood Hamilton (a leading Community member and architect of the Oneida Community Mansion House; now a museum), from whom he took his name. He was trained as a violinist and conductor (by Oneida Community member and bandleader Charles Joslyn). He worked as a printer and it is believed that his stepfather sent him to study at the New York College of Music, where he graduated. In 1881, when the Community dissolved, he started traveling as a member of a minstrel group arriving in Los Angeles in 1883. He worked in Los Angeles both as a printer and musician, with several experiences as director and a member of choirs, bands and orchestras. He worked with both amateur and professional orchestras.

Hamilton formed the LA Women's Orchestra in 1893 and the LA Symphony in 1897. Both became quite popular and contributed to the development of symphonic music in the Los Angeles area. He resigned from both in 1913, probably due to advancing deafness. He died of apoplexy (stroke) in 1933.
