= John Noyes =

John Noyes may refer to:

- John Noyes (politician), member of the United States House of Representatives from Vermont
- John Humphrey Noyes, American preacher, radical religious philosopher, and utopian socialist
- John Noyes (entomologist), Welsh entomologist
