= Harriet Hayes Skinner =

American writer and editor (1817–1893)

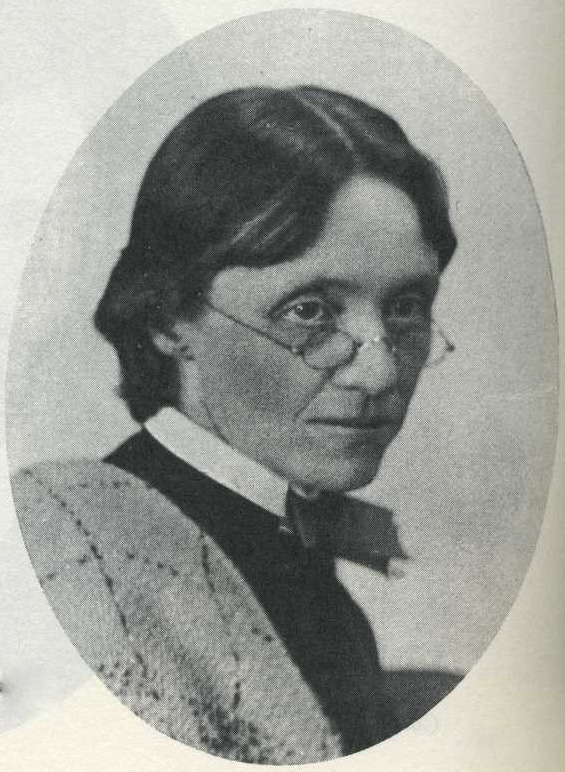
- Born: Harriet Hayes Noyes; July 5, 1817; Dummerston, Vermont, U.S.
- Died: September 8, 1893 (aged 76); Kenwood, New York, U.S.
- Resting place: Oneida Community Cemetery, Kenwood, New York, U.S.
- Occupations: Writer; editor; religious communalist
- Spouse: John Langdon Skinner (m. 1841; died 1889)
- Children: 1
- Relatives: John Noyes (father); John Humphrey Noyes (brother); Rutherford B. Hayes (cousin)
- Writing career
- Notable work: Oneida Community Cooking (1873)

Harriet Hayes Skinner (née Noyes; July 5, 1817 – September 8, 1893) was an American writer, editor, and religious communalist. She was the sister of John Humphrey Noyes, founder of the Oneida Community, and supported his Perfectionist religious views. Skinner joined the Putney Association and later the Oneida Community, where she contributed to community publications, served for a time as editor of the Oneida Circular, taught composition and spelling, and worked in domestic and culinary roles. She authored the vegetarian cookbook Oneida Community Cooking (1873), which recorded the community's food practices.

== Biography ==
=== Early life and family ===
Harriet Hayes Noyes was born on July 5, 1817, in Dummerston, Vermont, the seventh of nine children in the Noyes family. The family descended from Nicholas Noyes, who emigrated from England and settled in Newbury, Massachusetts, in 1634.

Her father, John Noyes (1764–1841), graduated from Dartmouth College and served as a member of the U.S. House of Representatives from Vermont. Her mother, Polly (née Hayes; 1780–1866), was the daughter of Rutherford Hayes and the sister of the father of future U.S. President Rutherford B. Hayes.

Skinner grew up in Putney, Vermont, in a religious household. In 1831, during a revival movement, her brother John Humphrey Noyes experienced a religious conversion that later influenced members of the Noyes family. By 1837, Skinner had publicly expressed support for his theology, including his belief in the possibility of salvation from sin in the present life. Noyes later founded the utopian Oneida Community.

On March 3, 1841, she married John Langdon Skinner (1803–1889), a native of Westmoreland, New Hampshire. He was a fellow convert and editorial assistant to her brother. The couple had one child, Joseph John Skinner, who later became a professor at Yale University and held advanced degrees in civil engineering and philosophy.

=== Oneida Community ===
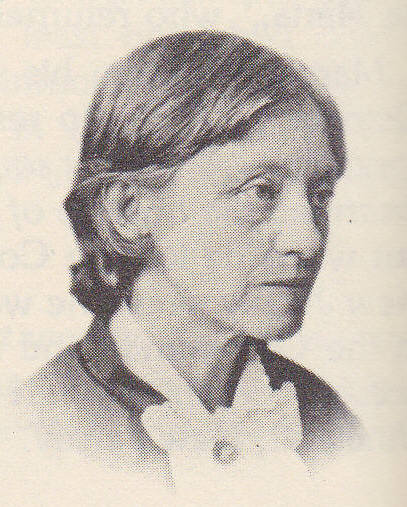
Skinner in her later years

Skinner took part in religious activities with her family and contributed to publications associated with the Perfectionist movement. She joined the Putney Association at its inception and later joined the Oneida Community on June 16, 1848, with her husband and son.

Within the community, she worked in intellectual, domestic, and culinary roles. She authored Oneida Community Cooking, first published in 1873, which recorded the community's food practices. The book promoted fresh, local ingredients and included the statement, "freshness is the sauce and seasoning for everything".

Skinner contributed to community publications, served for a time as editor of the Oneida Circular, and wrote for other periodicals. She also taught composition and spelling, and from 1874 acted as housekeeper for her brother during his vacations at Joppa.

=== Views on free love ===
Skinner supported the Oneida Community's principle of free love. In writing quoted by Thomas Low Nichols and Mary Gove Nichols, she contrasted it with conventional marriage, which she associated with selfishness and social limitation. She argued that free love encouraged generosity and communal unity, and stated that it had affected her own character.

=== Later life and death ===
In 1881, the Oneida Community dissolved and reorganized as a joint-stock company, which later developed into the silverware manufacturer Oneida Limited. Skinner died in Kenwood, New York, on September 8, 1893, and was buried at the Oneida Community Cemetery.

== Publications ==
- New Haven Perfectionism versus Methodist Sanctification (1848)
- Oneida Community Cooking: Or a Dinner Without Meat (Oneida Community, 1873)
- The Theodores of the Bible: A Lecture (with Constance Bradley Noyes; Oneida Community, c. 1877)
- History of the Fever and Ague War in Wallingford, in Two Letters, reprinted from the Correspondence of the American Socialist (with John Humphrey Noyes; Wallingford Printing Company, 1876)
