= Pierrepont Noyes =

American businessman and writer (1870–1959)

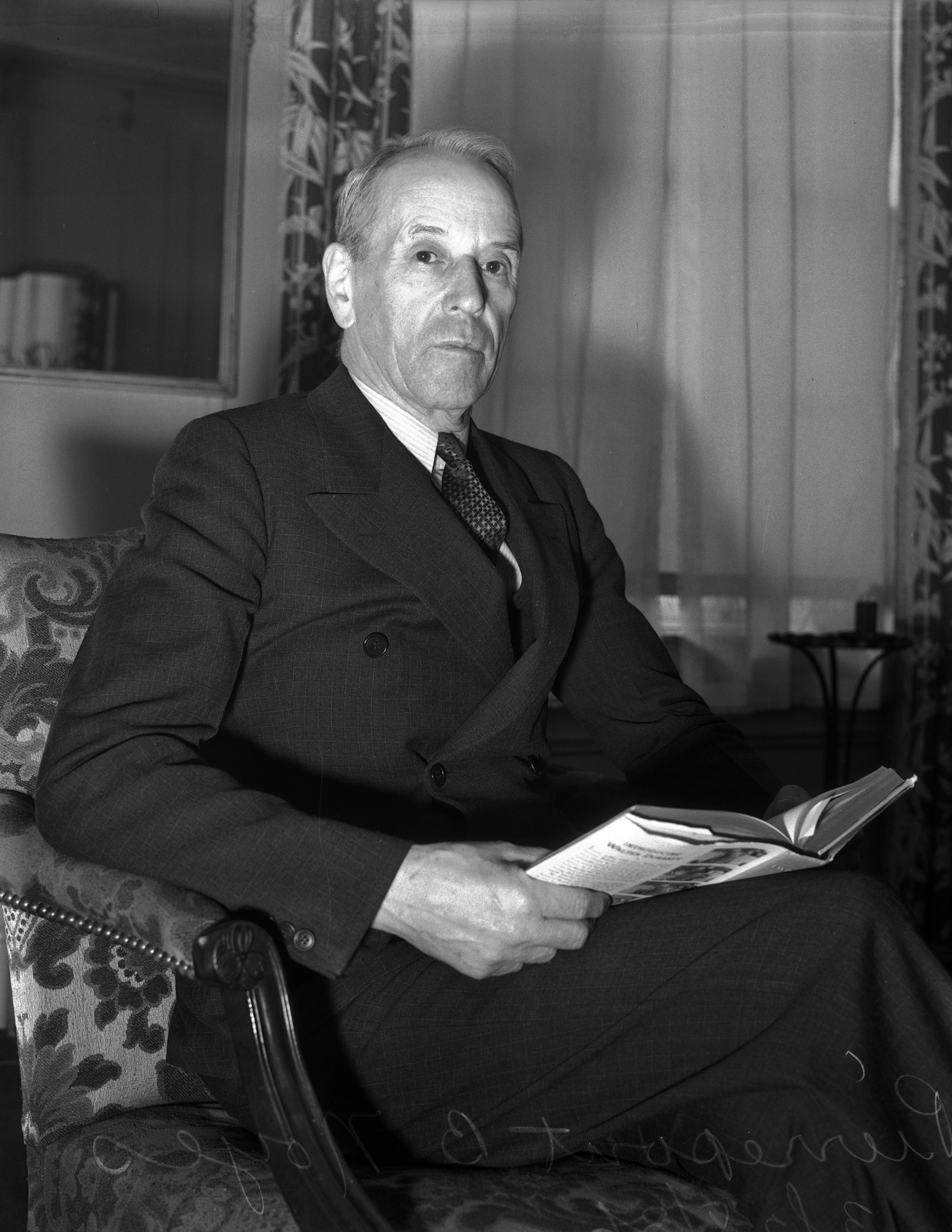
Pierrepont B. Noyes

Pierrepont Burt Noyes (August 18, 1870 – April 15, 1959) was an American businessman and writer. He was brought up in the Oneida Community, a religious Utopian group. Noyes later became the head of Oneida Limited, a position he held for many years.

== Early life ==
Pierrepont "P. B." Noyes was born in the Oneida Community (1848–1880), a group of religious perfectionists who lived communally in New York State. The Community was led by Noyes' father, John Humphrey Noyes.

In the early years of the Community, members practiced birth control in order to keep the birthrate low. By the late 1860s, Noyes and other Community members developed an interest in selective breeding. They hoped that religious devotion might be inheritable, and that they could pass on their own strong sense of spirituality to another generation. They called their eugenics experiment "stirpiculture" and the children born in the experiment were known as stirpicults. Between 1869 and 1879, forty-five "stirpicults" were born. Pierrepoint was the son of John Humphrey Noyes and Harriet Maria Worden, and he was a product of their eugenic outlook. Through his father, he was a first cousin once removed of U.S. President Rutherford B. Hayes.

Like all Community children, Noyes was raised in the children's wing of the group's home. He visited his mother occasionally, and in his autobiography recalled being closer to his mother than to his father: "I owe immensely more to my mother, in the warp and woof of character, than I do to my father. He never seemed a father to me in the ordinary sense. I revered him, but he was much too far away, too near to heaven and God."

After the Community voted to disband in 1880, Noyes lived with his mother.

== Oneida Limited ==
After studying at Colgate University, followed by Harvard University, P.B. Noyes joined Oneida Limited, the company that emerged from the commune after his father's death. He went on to become president of the company, steering it towards specializing in silverware and stainless steel cutlery. In 1894, he married another stirpicult, Corinna Ackley Kinsley (who was also his half-niece), and the couple had three children.

As the head of Oneida Limited, Noyes developed the company's ideology. He believed that "good wages were essential to good morale," and in 1904 proposed a policy of voluntary salary reductions for management whenever the company was in financial difficulties. The company followed this during economic troubles in 1921. Historian Maren Lockwood Carden wrote that, "Noyes halved his own salary, the directors took a one-third reduction, and the other officials took smaller ones in proportion to their regular salaries."

Noyes also encouraged the development of Sherrill, New York, as a community for employees. In 1905, the company laid out plans for the town, giving bonuses to those employees who built their own homes there. The company also helped to fund athletic clubs, a golf course, and the building of a new elementary school and a new high school.

== Government work ==
In 1917, Noyes resigned from the general manager role. During the First World War, he worked for the Federal Government as an Assistant Fuel Administrator. He represented the Fuel Administration on the requirements division and the priorities board of the War Industries Board. As the war came to an end, he was in France selling cutlery. In April 1919, he was persuaded to take up the role as the American Commissioner on the Inter-Allied Rhineland High Commission, a post he held until May 1920. His experiences led him to write his first book, While Europe Waits for Peace, in which he argued against the Allies' punitive policy in the Treaty of Versailles. He believed it would lead to more warfare.

Noyes returned to Oneida Limited in 1921, but eventually took on a more ceremonial role. In the 1930s, at the suggestion of Bernard Baruch, Noyes joined a six-man commission set up by the New York State Legislature to develop a new spa at Saratoga Springs. Noyes remained on the commission until 1950.

== Literary works ==
Noyes continued to write throughout his career, including a 1927 science fiction book titled The Pallid Giant: A Tale of Yesterday and Tomorrow. The Pallid Giant expressed Noyes' concerns about war, weapons, and the destruction of humanity. In the book, Noyes describes an ultimate super weapon that would "end all war by ending man." The book was re-issued as Gentlemen, You are Mad! after the use of atomic weapons on Hiroshima and Nagasaki in 1945.

Noyes also wrote two memoirs: My Father's House: An Oneida Boyhood, and A Goodly Heritage, a history of Oneida Limited, before his death in 1959.

=== Books ===
- While Europe Waits for Peace: Describing the Progress of Economic and Political Demoralization in Europe during the Year of American Hesitation (1921)
- The Pallid Giant: A Tale of Yesterday and Tomorrow (1927)
- My Father's House: An Oneida Boyhood (1937)
- Goodly Heritage (1958)
