= Coles Phillips =

American artist

Clarence Coles Phillips
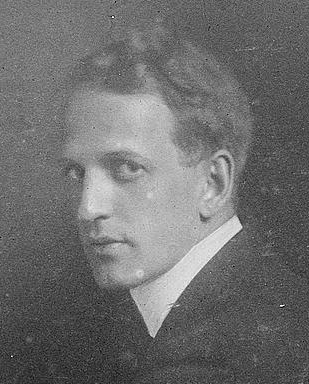
- Coles Phillips
- Born: October 3, 1880; United States
- Died: June 13, 1927 (aged 46)
- Occupations: Artist and illustrator
- Spouse: Teresa Hyde

Clarence Coles Phillips (October 3, 1880 – June 13, 1927) was an American artist and illustrator who signed his early works C. Coles Phillips, but after 1911 worked under the abbreviated name, Coles Phillips. He is known for his stylish images of women and a signature use of negative space in the paintings he created for advertisements and the covers of popular magazines.

== Early life ==
Phillips was born in Springfield, Ohio, the son of Anna Seys and Jacob Phillips. From 1902 to 1904, he attended Kenyon College in his native state, where he was a member of Alpha Delta Phi. His illustrations were published in the 1901–1904 editions of the school's yearbook, The Reveille.

After leaving Kenyon, Phillips moved to Manhattan, determined to earn a living through his art. He took night classes for three months at the Chase School of Art—his only formal artistic training—before establishing his own advertising agency. One of Phillips's employees was the young Edward Hopper, his former classmate.

In 1907, Phillips met with J. A. Mitchell, the publisher of Life magazine, and was hired onto its staff at the age of twenty-six. Phillips would be associated with the magazine throughout his life.

== Career ==
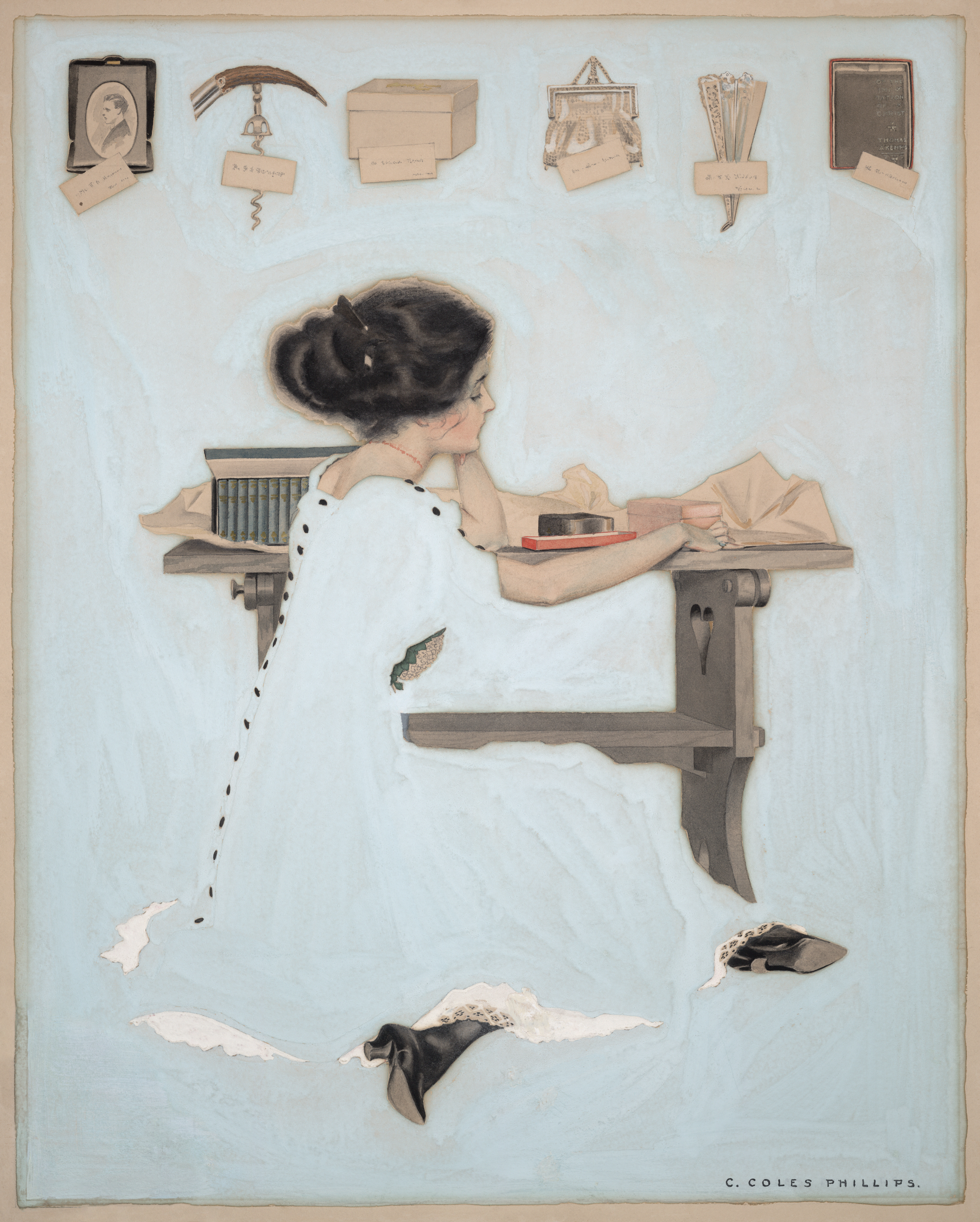
Cover art for Life Magazine, dated January 27, 1910, demonstrates Phillips's "fadeaway" technique: portions of the figure's skirt merge seamlessly with the background, yet the edge of the skirt remains easily defined by the viewer.

The work of Phillips quickly became popular with the Life readers. In May 1908, he created a cover for the magazine that featured his first "fadeaway girl" design with a figure whose clothing matched, and disappeared into, the background. Phillips developed this idea in many subsequent covers.

Phillips's use of negative space allowed the viewer to "fill-in" the image; it also reduced printing costs for the magazine, as "the novelty of the technique and the striking design qualities masked the fact that Life was getting by with single color or two-color covers in a day when full-color covers were de rigueur for the better magazines". Phillips worked in watercolor and always painted from life; according to his biographer, Michael Schau, "he refused to work from photographs or to use the pantograph".

Phillips produced cover art for other national magazines besides Life, including Good Housekeeping, which for two years (beginning in July 1912) made him their sole cover artist. Phillips also created many advertising images for makers of women's clothing, and for such clients as the Overland automobile company and Oneida Community flatware. His series depicting women wearing Holeproof Hosiery products was considered daring for its time. Phillips's works also appear in the 1921 and 1922 editions of the U. S. Naval Academy yearbook, Lucky Bag.

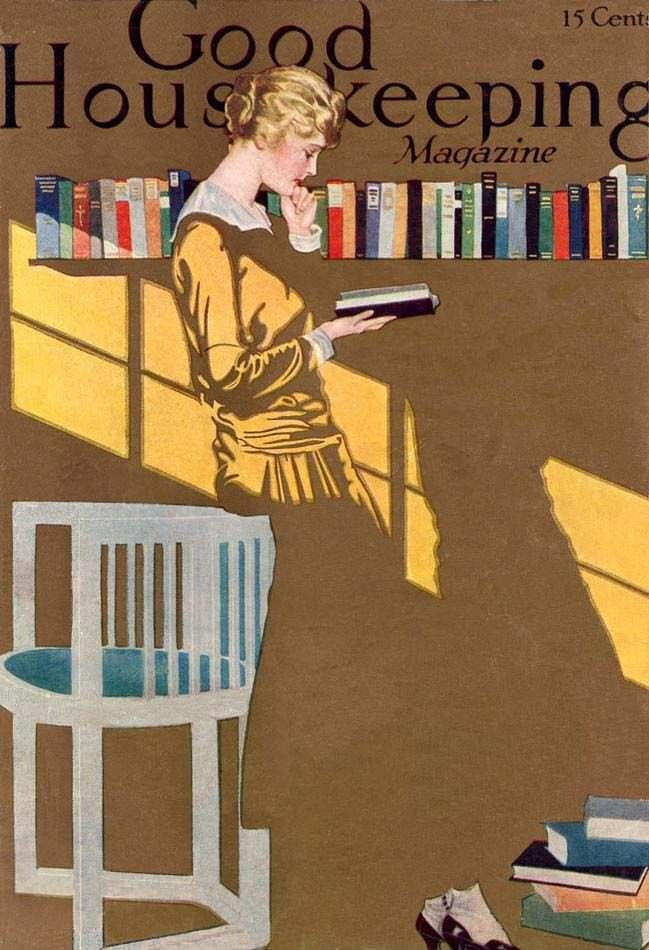
Cover of an issue of Good Housekeeping Magazine, February 1915, painted by Coles Phillips

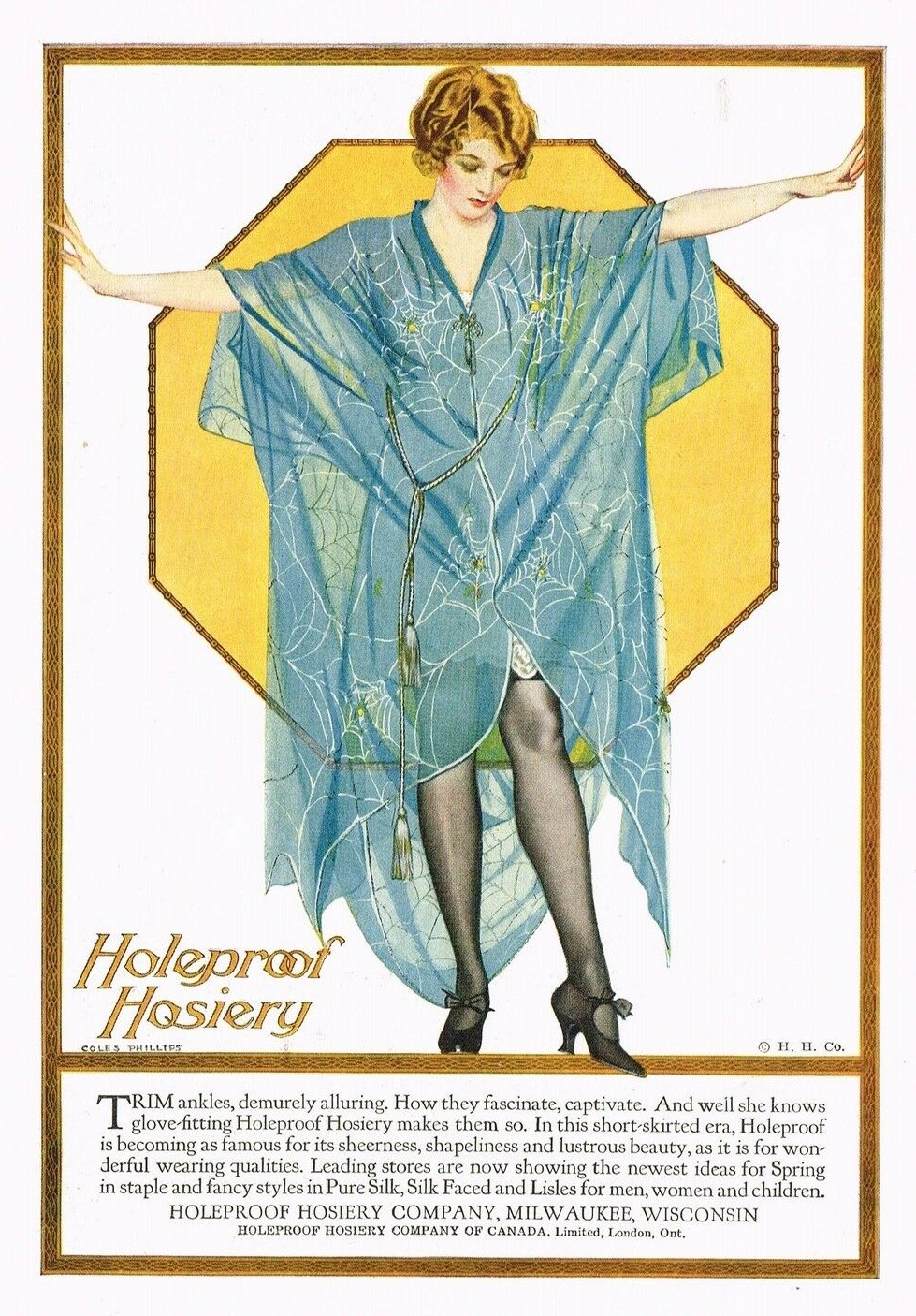
Holeproof Hosiery advert, painted by Coles Phillips (1921)

== Personal life ==
From 1905 until his death, Phillips lived and worked in New Rochelle, New York. His work habits were regular; his other activities included raising pigeons, a hobby he had pursued from the age of eight years.

In December 1907 Phillips met Teresa Hyde, a nurse who became his most frequent model during his early years. They married in early 1910.

In 1924 he was diagnosed with tuberculosis of the kidney (Renal TB), and for the remainder of his life he was frequently ill. In January 1927, when problems with his eyesight made painting difficult, he dedicated himself to writing. Phillips died in New Rochelle at his home, of his kidney ailment on June 13, 1927, at the age of forty-six. The funeral service was held on June 14 at the Sutton Manor home in New Rochelle and officiated by the Rev. Paul Gordon Favour from Trinity Episcopal Church of New Rochelle. Artist and friend, J.C. Leyendecker eulogized him as an artist "unique in his field, one with a highly developed sense of decoration and color... he was ahead of most men in depicting the American type of young womanhood." The body was then taken to Fresh Pond Crematory for cremation.

== Exhibitions ==
Phillips's works are often exhibited alongside those of other notable graphic artists. In 2002, the Swann Gallery's "American Beauties: Drawings from the Golden Age of Illustration" featured Phillips, Charles Dana Gibson, Wladyslaw Benda, and Nell Brinkley, among others. Phillips was also included in the Norman Rockwell Museum's "Toast of the Town: Norman Rockwell and the Artists of New Rochelle" and in "Illustrating Modern Life: The Golden Age of American Illustration from the Kelly Collection" at the Frederick R. Weisman Museum of Art at Pepperdine University. In 2015, the Oneida Community Mansion House presented an exhibition focused on Phillips’s ads created for Oneida silverware from 1911 to 1924.
