= Susan E. Engel =

- Education: Cornell University; Harvard Business School
- Occupation: Business executive
- Employer: Lenox Group
- Known for: Former CEO of Lenox Group; former director of Wells Fargo

Susan E. Engel is an American business executive. She is the retired chief executive officer of Lenox Group, Inc., and former member of the Wells Fargo & Company board of directors.

== Early life and education ==
Engel received her BS degree in industrial and labor relations from Cornell University in 1968 and her MBA degree from Harvard Business School in 1976. She began her business career with the J.C. Penney Company in 1968. In 1977 she joined Booz Allen Hamilton as vice president. From 1991 to 1994 she was president and chief executive officer of the Champion Products Division of Sara Lee.

== Career ==
=== Lenox ===
She joined Lenox Group, Inc. (formerly Department 56, Inc.), as president and chief operating officer in September 1994, a year after the company's initial public offering.

In February 1996 Engel was elected a director of Lenox Group. She was elected chairwoman and chief executive officer in November 1996. Early in 1998 Engel was elected a director of Norwest Corporation. Later that year Norwest merged with Wells Fargo, and she became a director of the latter. She was elected a director of Supervalu, Inc., in 1999.

Engel retired as chairwoman, CEO and a director of Lenox Group in 2007. Besides serving as a director and SuperValu, she is also a member of the board of overseers of the Carlson School of Management at the University of Minnesota.

In the political realm, she has been a member of Obama for Illinois, John Kerry for president, Hillary Clinton for president, Al Franken for Senate, and the Minneapolis Board of Advisers of the League of Women Voters.

=== Wells Fargo & Company ===
Engel served as director from May 1998 until April 2017.

On February 28, 2017, Engel, informed the company that she would not stand for re-election and will retire as a member of the Board at the company's Annual Meeting of Stockholders on April 25, 2017.
