= John Noyes (politician) =

American politician

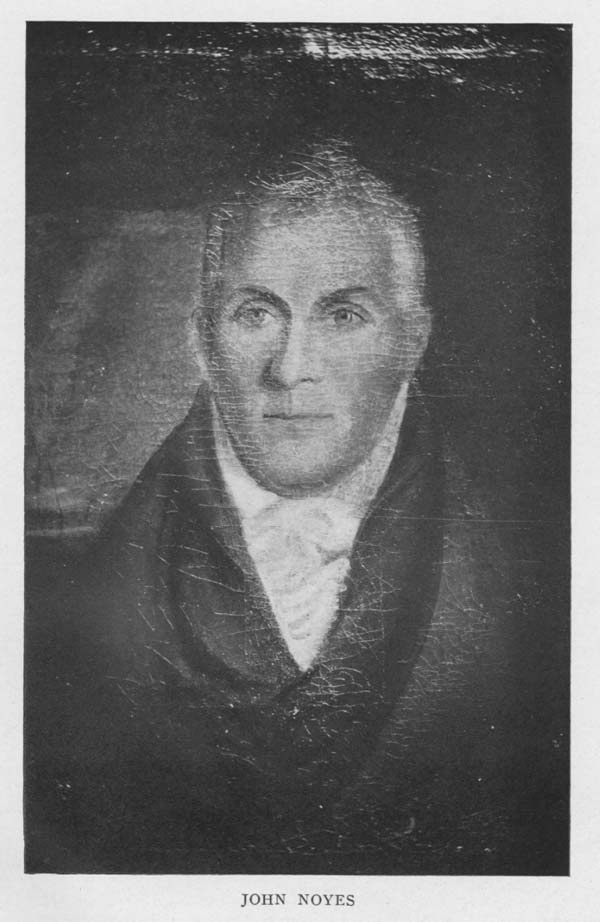

Member of the United States House of Representatives from Vermont's at-large district
- In office March 4, 1815 – March 3, 1817
- Preceded by: Ezra Butler
- Succeeded by: William Hunter

Member of the Vermont House of Representatives
- In office 1808–1810

Personal details
- Born: April 2, 1764 Atkinson, Province of New Hampshire, British America
- Died: October 26, 1841 (aged 77) near Putney, Vermont, U.S.
- Party: Federalist Party
- Spouse: Polly Hayes Noyes
- Children: 4, including John and Harriet
- Profession: Politician, businessman

John Noyes (April 2, 1764 – October 26, 1841) was an American politician. He served as a member of the United States House of Representatives from Vermont.

== Biography ==
Noyes was born in Atkinson in the Province of New Hampshire to Humphrey Noyes and Elizabeth Little. He attended Phillips Exeter Academy and graduated from Dartmouth College in 1795, where he studied theology. After graduation, he worked as a tutor at Chesterfield Academy from 1795 until 1797, and at Dartmouth College from 1797 until 1799. One of the students he taught at Dartmouth was Daniel Webster, 14th and 19th United States Secretary of State.

In 1800 Noyes moved to Brattleboro, Vermont and focused on business pursuits. He was a member of the firm of "Noyes, Mann and Hayes", one of the earliest chain stores in America. The other members of the firm were Jonas Mann and Rutherford Hayes Jr.

Noyes served as presidential elector Vermont in 1804. He was a member of the Vermont House of Representatives from 1808 until 1810. He was elected as a Federalist Representative to the Fourteenth Congress, and served from March 4, 1815, until March 3, 1817. After leaving Congress, Noyes moved to Dummerston, Vermont, and lived there until 1822, when he moved his family to Putney, Vermont.

== Family life ==
Noyes married Polly Hayes Noyes in September 1804 in West Brattleboro, Vermont. They had four children together: John Humphrey Noyes, Charlotte Augusta Noyes Miller, Harriet Hayes Skinner and George Washington Noyes. John Humphrey Noyes was an American utopian socialist who founded the Oneida Community in 1848.

Noyes was the uncle of President Rutherford B. Hayes by marriage on Hayes's father's side.

== Death ==
Noyes retired in 1819, and died on October 26, 1841, at his farm near Putney, Vermont. He is interred at Maple Grove Cemetery in Putney.

U.S. House of Representatives
Preceded by Ezra Butler	Member of the U.S. House of Representatives from Vermont's at-large congressional district March 4, 1815 – March 3, 1817	Succeeded by William Hunter
