= Oneida stirpiculture =

Eugenic experiments in 19th-century United States

The stirpiculture experiment at the Oneida Community (a Christian perfectionist commune near Oneida, New York) was the first "positive" eugenics experiment in American history, resulting in the planned conception, birth, and rearing of 58 children, bred from selected members of the Oneida Community. The experiment lasted from 1869–1879, notably about two decades before Francis Galton would coin the term "eugenics" and the emergence of eugenics as a practice and popular social movement in America in the 1900s. The Oneida stirpiculture experiment was largely ignored or dismissed by those later eugenicists because of its "context in a socially subversive Christian environment." The term stirpiculture was used by John Humphrey Noyes, founder of the Oneida Community, to refer to his system of eugenics, or the breeding of humans to achieve desired perfections within the species. Noyes derived stirpiculture from the Latin word "stirps", which means "stock, stem, or root" (Carden). It has been claimed that Noyes coined the term two decades before Francis Galton created the term "eugenics". In 1904, Galton claimed that he had first come up with the term and "deliberately changed it for eugenics," a claim supported in print by George Willis Cooke. In his 1883 book Inquiries into Human Faculty and Its Development, Galton noted that his new term "eugenics" was a suitable replacement for the older term "viriculture" that he had invented, suggesting that he had confused the two terms "viriculture" and "stirpiculture."

== Origins of the Oneida stirpiculture experiment ==
Until the late 1860s, John Humphrey Noyes and his community prevented the unintentional conception of children through their practice of male continence (a type of coitus reservatus). Instead, Noyes and the community believed in only having children with purpose and preparation. In this communal society, it was not simply about the preparedness of the parents, but rather the preparedness of the community to support a new generation. "A mistake was considered a serious detriment to the society" (Kinsley 13). In the early years of the community, when poverty was an issue, the community did not feel adequately prepared to take on the raising and support of children. Therefore, procreation was discouraged in these early days before the financial successes of the community's trap-building manufacturing. An "accidental" conception was thought to be a failure in male continence, the act that was meant to prevent unwanted pregnancies through the withholding of male ejaculation during intercourse. However, accidental conceptions did occur.

Noyes developed the stirpiculture experiment through his reading and interpretations of Plato, Charles Darwin, Francis Galton and agricultural breeders. Noyes had begun to read Darwin's Principles of Breeding and Sir Francis Galton's papers and books on subjects ranging from anthropology, meteorology, horticulture, and eugenics (Circular, Vol II, No. 3, March 27, 1865). Intrigued by these readings, Noyes expanded upon these ideas and considered the potential benefits in the use of scientific propagation to create humans through intentional reproduction rather than haphazard sex.

== The experiment ==
In 1869, the Oneida Community began its experiment with stirpiculture, which Noyes governed in tandem with a committee. Community men and women were paired owing to their exhibition of superior mental and spiritual qualities. The Circular, a newspaper run by the Oneida Community for the Community, printed several articles outlining Noyes' idea of what the Oneida Community should strive to achieve in its experiment: all of the qualities of Christianity's patriarchs' (Abraham's obedience, Jesus as the Son of God).

=== Participants ===
Noyes was the main judge of the men and women selected to parent children in the experiment, but he also sought the aid of a committee. This committee approved and denied requests of community members to have a child. Many members applied as couples, and some of the couples were actually encouraged by the committee itself. There was a set of standards by which each candidate should meet; older men in the Community were especially sought after according to the community's idea of Ascending Fellowship, as Noyes believed they were much wiser and spiritually sound. Women, on the other hand, were typically between the ages of 20 and 42. Both men and women were chosen based on spiritual and virtuous qualities, as opposed to physical ones. Each potential parent was required to sign a contract committing themselves to the experiment, and most importantly to God and his human representative Noyes (Carden 62). Most important in these pledges were the promises to avoid any "personal feelings in regard to child-bearing" because it was believed that this quality would help them to better serve the experiment and most importantly, the Community.

=== Raising the children ===
Children at Oneida were raised communally, not specifically by their biological parents. They were brought up under the supervision of community "Mothers" and "Fathers" who were assigned the job of childcare in a separate wing of the Oneida Community's Mansion House. Many community members also assisted with childcare.

The children were raised with access to the countryside and good nutrition, and Oneida was isolated from chronic diseases that might have affected children in more crowded areas. As the children grew, their families and friends encouraged them to go to college and to achieve worldly success. If they decided to attend college, they would board with The New Haven Family sect of the community. In part, this push toward outside education, especially scientific education, would contribute to the breakup of the Oneida Community.

==== The first 15 months ====
Once a child was born, they stayed with their mother for the first 15 months of life. During this period the mother was allowed and even encouraged to breastfeed the child. Breastfeeding was one of the only instances in which a strong attachment between mother and child was encouraged. This was due to its ability to encompass both scientific and natural views of life.

==== The Children's House ====
Once weaned, children were sent to live in the Children's House. In the early days of the community, this "house" was a succession of rooms in the "Middle House". For some time after being weaned, children still slept with their mothers at night. Once they reached a certain age, they were discouraged from sleeping in their mothers' rooms. Still concerned with creating a bond between the child and the community, children would often sleep in the bed of a community member. This member changed periodically so no special attachments could be formed, and thus detract from the overall communal commitment.

==== Values of non-attachment ====
Guidelines were established by the community to help direct parents in establishing an appropriate relationship with their child. Most of these guidelines were an extension of the principles of non-attachment and commitment to the communal ideal. The concern was that an excessive relationship would fail to appropriately teach the child the communal fundamentals of the community. It was acceptable to be attached, as long as this was a general emotion of love and trust to the community, rather than to a particular individual. A mother's excessive attachment to her child was seen as a potential cause for illness or suffering on the child's part. In cases like this, it was often prescribed that the mother or child be temporarily moved to another community site for some time.

=== Results ===
The experiment with stirpiculture in the Oneida Community lasted from 1869 to 1879; 58 children were born as a result. Most men and women had only one child, but some had two or three, with 13 of these recorded as "accidental conceptions". To prove his religious and social prowess, as well as that of his bloodline, John H. Noyes and his son Theodore produced 12 children between them, 11 of whom survived. The Community was heavily invested in raising children to follow its ideals and guidelines, and values such as non-attachment were impressed upon children, even at a young age.

Each child at Oneida was well supported and cared for within the community. They were given a lot of play time and rooms in which to do so, as the Oneidans believed in the importance of exercise. Both girls and boys were provided an education, and some of the children even went on to college, and were encouraged to do so. They were under the constant guidance of older community members. Theodore Noyes, son of John H. Noyes, kept detailed records of the growth and development of the children produced and raised in the stirpiculture experiment. Only one was reported to have physical disabilities. The children learned the importance of non-attachment and commitment to the community; however, it is apparent that some special relationships did occur. The experiment ended in 1879, as the community began to break up.

== Sources ==
- Carden, Maren Lockwood (1969). Oneida: Utopian Community to Modern Corporation. Baltimore: Johns Hopkins Press.
- Ellis, John B. (1870). "15: "The Juvenile Saints"". Free Love and Its Votaries (American Socialism Unmasked). San Francisco: A.L. Bancroft & Co. pp. 221–237.
- Noyes, John Humphrey (April 3, 1865), "Stirpiculture", The Circular, vol. II, no. 3
- Rich, Jane Kinsley, ed. (1983). A Lasting Spring: Jessie Catherine Kinsley, Daughter of the Oneida Community. Syracuse University Press.
- Youcha, Geraldine (2005) [1995]. Minding the Children: Child Care in America from Colonial Times to the Present. Da Capo Press.
