= Oneida Community =

Religious commune in Oneida, New York (1848–1881)

- Intentional community
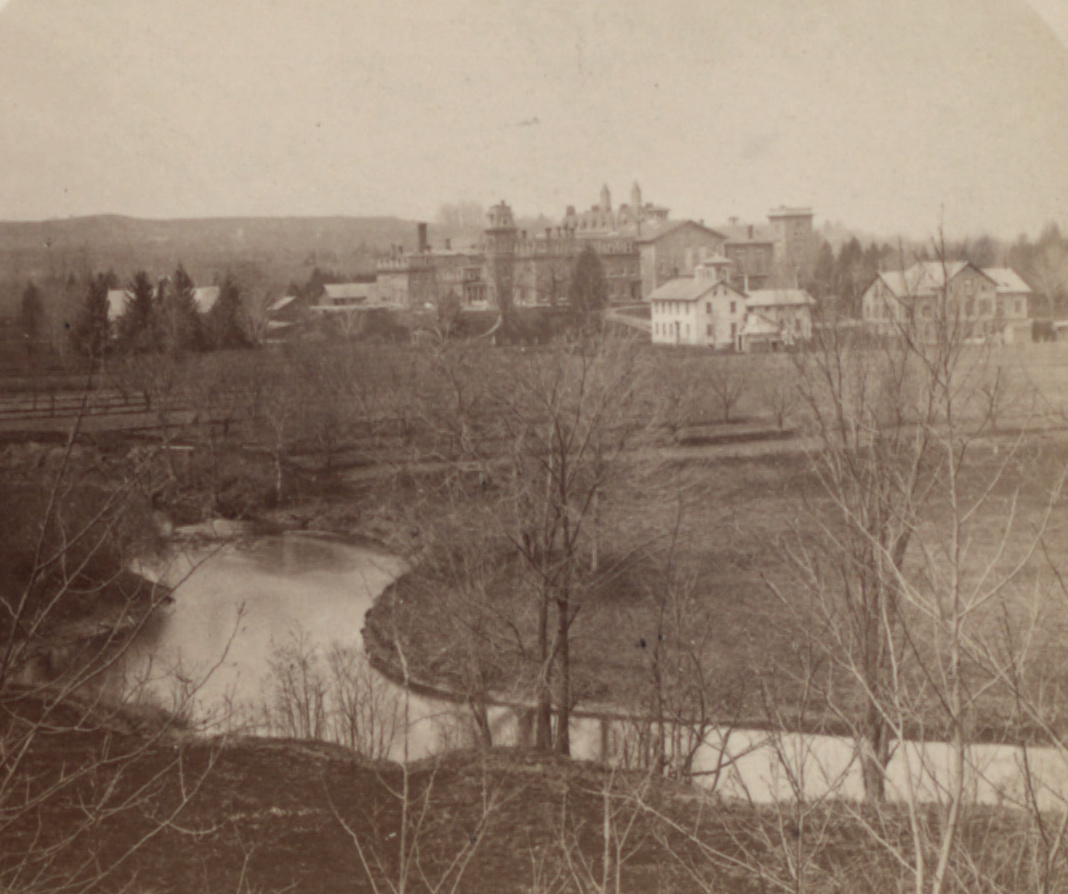
- An aerial view of Oneida's home buildings
- Interactive map of Oneida Community
- Coordinates: 43.060356°N 75.605175°W
- Country: United States
- State: New York
- County: Madison
- County: Oneida
- Established: 1848
- Founder: John Humphrey Noyes

Area
  - Total: 160 acres (65 ha)
- Dissolved: 1881

The Oneida Community (/oʊˈnaɪdə/ oh-NYE-də) was a Christian perfectionist communal society founded by John Humphrey Noyes and his followers in 1848 near Oneida, New York during the Second Great Awakening. The community believed that Jesus had already returned in 70 AD, making it possible for them to bring about Jesus's millennial kingdom themselves, and be perfect and free of sin in this world, not just in Heaven, a belief called perfectionism. The Oneida Community practiced communalism – in the sense of communal property and possessions – group marriage, male sexual continence, Oneida stirpiculture (a form of eugenics), and mutual criticism.

The community site originally covered more than 160 acres of land surrounding Oneida Creek in Madison County, New York and Oneida County, New York. The community's original 87 members grew to 172 by February 1850, 208 by 1852, and 306 by 1878. Other Noyesian communities were founded in Wallingford, Connecticut; Newark, New Jersey; Putney and Cambridge, Vermont. The branches were closed in 1854 except for the Wallingford branch, which operated until its destruction by tornado in 1878.

The Oneida Community dissolved in 1881, converting itself to a joint-stock company. This eventually became the silverware company Oneida Limited, one of the largest in the world.

== History ==
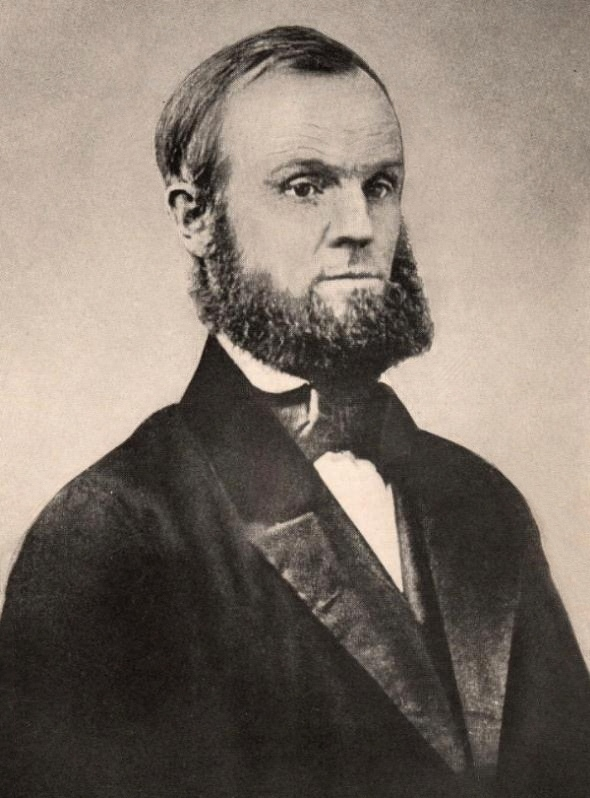
John Humphrey Noyes, founder of the Oneida Community

The land the Oneida Community settled on was made available for purchase by Euro-American settlers after its acquisition by the State of New York in a series of agreements with the Oneida Indian Nation in 1840 and 1842. The initial farmstead of the Oneida Community was purchased by Jonathan Burt, an early convert to the religious doctrine of Christian perfectionism. In 1847, Burt invited John Humphrey Noyes and his associates in Putney, Vermont to come to Oneida and establish a Perfectionist community.

At the time, Noyes and his followers were living in Putney, Vermont in a group known as the Putney Association. The group lived communally, as one family sharing property and work, in a system they called "Bible communism." Controversially, the community also practiced free love, complex marriage, and polyamory. Noyes was charged with committing adultery, and to escape the charges, the group moved to Oneida in March 1848, to found the Oneida Community.

== Structure ==
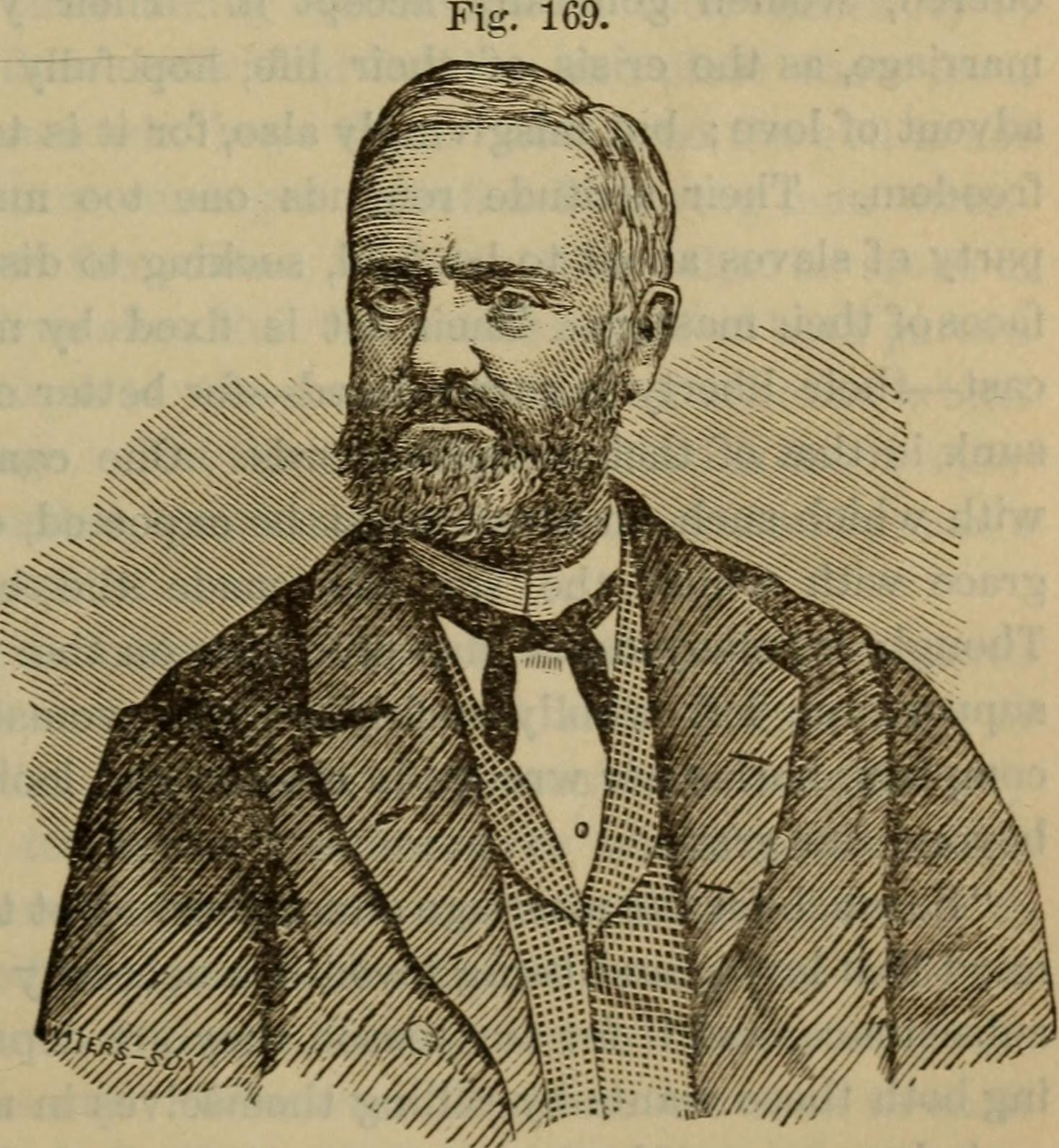
John Humphrey Noyes (1811–1886) led the community

Even though the community only reached a maximum population of about 300, it had a complex bureaucracy of 27 standing committees and 48 administrative sections.

All community members were expected to work, each according to their abilities. Women tended to do many of the domestic duties. Although more skilled jobs tended to remain with an individual member (the financial manager, for example, held his post throughout the life of the community), community members rotated through the more unskilled jobs, working in the house, the fields, or the various industries. As Oneida thrived, it hired outsiders. The community was a major employer in the area and had approximately 200 employees by 1870.

Secondary industries included manufacturing leather travel bags, weaving palm frond hats, construction of rustic garden furniture, and tourism. A community member, Canadian Sewell Newhouse, invented and patented the Oneida trap, which was popular among trappers at the time. Silverware manufacturing began in 1877, relatively late in the community's life, and still exists.

The Oneida Community had a hand-book called Hand-book of the Oneida Community, with a Sketch of its founder and an Outline of its Constitution and Doctrines, which joining members had to read to be able to show them what was required to be able to join; it revealed the different types of principles the community had to follow, the social practices, and what their daily life would look like.

=== Complex marriage ===
The Oneida Community practiced complex marriage or free love – a term that Noyes is credited with coining. Any member was free to have sex with any other who consented. The community frowned upon possessiveness and exclusive relationships.

Noyes developed a distinction between amative and propagative love.

Complex marriage meant that everyone in the community was married to everyone else. All men and women were expected to have sexual relations and did. The basis for complex marriage was the Pauline passage about there being no marriage in heaven meant that there should be no marriage on earth, but that no marriage did not mean no sex. But sex meant children; not only could the community not afford children in the early years, the women were not enthusiastic about a regime that would have kept them pregnant most of the time. They developed a distinction between amative and propagative love. Propagative love was sex for the purpose of having children; amative love was sex for the purpose of expressing love. The difference was what Noyes called "male continence", in which the male partner avoided ejaculation. Noyes argued that this practice not only kept them from producing unwanted children but also taught the male considerable self-control. The system worked very well.

Women over 40 were to act as sexual "mentors" to adolescent boys because these relationships had a minimal chance of conceiving. Furthermore, these women became religious role models for the young men. Likewise, older men often introduced young women to sex. Noyes often used his judgment in determining the partnerships that would form, and he would often encourage relationships between the non-devout and the devout in the community in the hope that the attitudes and behaviors of the devout would influence the attitudes of the non-devout.

In 1993, the community archives were made available to scholars for the first time. Contained within the archives was the journal of Tirzah Miller, Noyes' niece, who wrote extensively about her romantic and sexual relations with other members of Oneida.

=== Mutual criticism ===
Every member of the community was subject to criticism by a committee or the community as a whole during a general meeting. The goal was to eliminate undesirable character traits. Various contemporary sources contend that Noyes himself was the subject of criticism, although less often and of probably less severe criticism than the rest of the community. Charles Nordhoff said he had witnessed the criticism of a member he referred to as "Charles", writing the following account of the incident:

Charles sat speechless, looking before him; but as the accusations multiplied, his face grew paler, and drops of perspiration began to stand on his forehead. The remarks I have reported took up about half an hour; and now, each one in the circle having spoken, Mr. Noyes summed up. He said that Charles had some serious faults; that he had watched him with some care; and that he thought the young man was earnestly trying to cure himself. He spoke in general praise of his ability, his good character, and of certain temptations he had resisted in the course of his life. He thought he saw signs that Charles was making a real and earnest attempt to conquer his faults; and as one evidence of this, he remarked that Charles had lately come to him to consult him upon a difficult case in which he had had a severe struggle, but had in the end succeeded in doing right. "In the course of what we call stirpiculture", said Noyes, "Charles, as you know, is in the situation of one who is by and by to become a father. Under these circumstances, he has fallen under the too common temptation of selfish love, and a desire to wait upon and cultivate an exclusive intimacy with the woman who was to bear a child through him. This is an insidious temptation, very apt to attack people under such circumstances; but it must nevertheless be struggled against." Charles, he went on to say, had come to him for advice in this case, and he (Noyes) had at first refused to tell him any thing, but had asked him what he thought he ought to do; that after some conversation, Charles had determined, and he agreed with him, that he ought to isolate himself entirely from the woman, and let another man take his place at her side; and this Charles had accordingly done, with a most praiseworthy spirit of selfsacrifice. Charles had indeed still further taken up his cross, as he had noticed with pleasure, by going to sleep with the smaller children, to take charge of them during the night. Taking all this in view, he thought Charles was in a fair way to become a better man, and had manifested a sincere desire to improve, and to rid himself of all selfish faults.

=== Male continence ===
The Oneida Community enacted a system of male continence or coitus reservatus to control reproduction within it. John Humphrey Noyes decided that sexual intercourse served two distinct purposes. In Male Continence, Noyes argues that the method simply "proposes the subordination of the flesh to the spirit, teaching men to seek principally the elevated spiritual pleasures of sexual connection". The primary purpose of male continence was social satisfaction, "to allow the sexes to communicate and express affection for one another". The second purpose was procreation. Of around two hundred adults using male continence as birth control, there were twelve unplanned births within Oneida between 1848 and 1868, indicating that it was a highly effective form of birth control. Young men were introduced to male continence by post-menopausal women, and experienced, older males introduced young women.

Noyes believed that ejaculation "drained men's vitality and led to disease" and pregnancy and childbirth "levied a heavy tax on the vitality of women". Noyes founded male continence to spare his wife, Harriet, from more difficult childbirths after five traumatizing births of which four led to the death of the child. They favored this method of male continence over other methods of birth control because they found it to be natural, healthy, and favorable for the development of intimate relationships. Women found increased sexual satisfaction in the practice, and Oneida is regarded as highly unusual in the value they placed on women's sexual satisfaction. If a male failed, he faced public disapproval or private rejection.

It is unclear whether the practice of male continence led to significant problems. Sociologist Lawrence Foster sees hints in Noyes' letters indicating that masturbation and anti-social withdrawal from community life may have been issues. Oneida's practice of male continence did not lead to impotence.

=== Stirpiculture ===
Stirpiculture was a proto-eugenics program of selective controlled reproduction within the community devised by Noyes and implemented in 1869. It was designed to create more spiritually and physically perfect children. Community members who wished to be parents would go before a committee to be approved and matched based on their spiritual and moral qualities. 53 women and 38 men participated in this program, which necessitated the construction of a new wing of the Oneida Community Mansion House. The experiment yielded 58 children, nine of whom were fathered by Noyes.

Once children were weaned (usually at around the age of one), they were raised communally in the Children's Wing, or South Wing. Their parents were allowed to visit, but the children's department held jurisdiction over raising the offspring. If the department suspected a parent and child were bonding too closely, the community would enforce a period of separation because the group wanted to stop the affection between parents and children. The Children's department had a male and female supervisor to look after children between ages two and twelve. The supervisors made sure the children followed the routine. Dressing, prayers, breakfast, work, school, lunch, work, playtime, supper, prayers, and study, which were "adjusted according to 'age and ability'."

Stirpiculture was the first positive eugenics experiment in the United States, although it was not recognized as such because of the religious framework from which it emerged.

=== Role of women ===
Oneida embodied one of the most radical institutional efforts to change women's roles and improve female status in 19th-century America. Women had freedoms in the commune that they could not get outside of it. Some of these privileges included not having to care for their own children, as Oneida had a communal child care system, and freedom from unwanted pregnancies due to Oneida's male continence practice. In addition, they were able to wear functional, Bloomer-style clothing and maintain short haircuts. Women could participate in practically all types of community work. While domestic duties remained a primarily female responsibility, women were free to explore positions in business and sales, or as artisans or craftspersons, and many did so, particularly in the late 1860s and early 1870s. Finally, women actively shaped commune policy, participating in daily religious and business meetings.

The complex marriage and free love systems practiced at Oneida further acknowledged female status. Through the complex marriage arrangement, women and men had equal freedom in sexual expression and commitment. Indeed, sexual practices at Oneida accepted female sexuality. A woman's right to satisfying sexual experiences was recognized, and women were encouraged to have orgasms. However, a woman's right to refuse a sexual overture was limited depending on the status of the man who made the advance.

Ellen Wayland-Smith, wrote in "The Status and Self-Perception of Women in the Oneida Community" that men and women had roughly equal status in the community. She points out that while both sexes were ultimately subject to Noyes' vision and will, women did not suffer undue oppression.

== Interactions with society ==
The community experienced freedom from wider society. The previously mentioned unorthodox marital, sexual, and religious practices caused them to face some criticism. However, between the community's beginning in the 1850s until the 1870s, their interactions with broader society were mostly favorable. These are the best-known instances of conflict and peace resolution.

=== Outside criticism ===
In 1870, a "nineteenth century cultural critic" John B. Ellis wrote a book against Free Love communities that Noyes inspired, including "Individual Sovereigns, Berlin Heights Free Lovers, Spiritualists, Advocates of Woman Suffrage, or Friends of Free Divorce". He saw their joint goal to be ending marriage. Ellis described this as an attack on the prevailing moral order. Historian Gayle Fischer mentions that Ellis also criticized Oneida women's clothing, saying "'healthful' uniforms did not rid Oneida women of their 'peculiar air of unhealthiness' — brought on by 'sexual excess'."

Noyes responded to Ellis' criticism four years later in a pamphlet, "Dixon and His Copytists", in which he claimed that John B. Ellis is a pseudonym for a "literary gentleman living in the upper part of the city." Noyes argued that AMS press employed the writer after they read a Philadelphia paper article on the community and saw a chance to profit off sensationalist writing.

=== Tryphena Hubbard's legal battle ===
In Anthony Wonderly's Oneida Utopia, he covers the 1848–1851 Hubbard affair as a moment where a legal conflict almost ended the group, which was only a mere "Association" at the time. Twenty-one-year-old Tryphena Hubbard learned Noyes' ideas about marriage and sex through his manuscript Bible Argument in 1848. She joined the community and became the group's first local convert. Tryphena Hubbard soon married Henry Seymour, a young man in the community.

Early in 1849, Tryphena's father, Noahdiah Hubbard, learned of the Association's open marriages and demanded his daughter's return. Tryphena refused, and for two years, Noahdiah "made a sulking nuisance of himself at the Mansion House."

An 1850 criticism of Tryphena mentioned her "insubordination to the church" and "excess egotism amounting to insanity." There was marriage before the community attempted perfectionism, and Tryphena's husband's supervision over her was increased along with the "disciplinary norms of the day, physical punishment."

In September 1851, Tryphena began displaying signs of mental illness, "crying at night, speaking incoherently, and wandering around." Seymour went to the Hubbard family to report their daughter's insanity, and both parents were appalled by Seymour's physical violence.

On September 27, 1851, Noahdiah Hubbard lodged assault and battery charges on behalf of his daughter. Seymour was indicted, and other community members were served arrest warrants as accessories.

The case was settled on November 26, 1851. The community agreed to Tryphena's expenses while she was in the asylum and after her release $125 a year if she was well and $200 a year if she remained unwell. The Hubbards eventually accepted a $350 settlement in lieu of long-term payments. Tryphena Hubbard eventually returned to Henry Seymour and had a child by him. She died at the age of 49 in 1877.

== Decline ==
The community lasted until John Humphrey Noyes attempted to pass leadership to his son, Theodore Noyes. This move was unsuccessful because Theodore was an agnostic and lacked his father's talent for leadership. The move also divided the community, as Communitarian James W. Towner attempted to wrest control for himself. Towner and a breakaway group eventually moved to California, where they convinced the government to create a new municipality for them, Orange County.

Commune members debated when children should be initiated into sex and by whom. They also debated about the community's existing sex practices as a whole. Founding members who supported free love were aging or deceased, and many younger members said they wanted to have exclusive, traditional marriages.

Professor John Mears of Hamilton College campaigned against the community. He called for a protest meeting against the Oneida Community, attended by forty-seven clergy members. In June 1879, trusted adviser Myron Kinsley informed John Humphrey Noyes that a warrant for his arrest on charges of statutory rape was imminent. Noyes fled the country in the middle of the night, moving to Canada, never to return to the United States. Shortly afterward, he wrote to his followers, recommending that complex marriage be abandoned. Complex marriage was abandoned that same year. Marital partners normalized their status with the partners with whom they were cohabiting at the time of the re-organization. Over 70 community members entered into a traditional marriage in the following year.

The community soon broke apart, with some of the members reorganizing as a joint-stock company, Oneida Community Limited. During the early 20th century, the new company, Oneida Community Limited, narrowed its focus to silverware. The animal trap business was sold in 1912, the silk business in 1916, and the canning was discontinued as unprofitable in 1915.

In 1947, embarrassed by their progenitor's legacy, Noyes' descendants burned the group's records.

Oneida Limited still exists and is a major producer of cutlery. In September 2004, Oneida Limited announced that it would cease all U.S. manufacturing operations at the beginning of 2005, ending a 124-year tradition. The company continues to design and market products manufactured overseas. The company has been selling off its manufacturing facilities. Most recently, it closed its distribution center in Sherrill, New York. Administrative offices remain in the Oneida area.

The last original member of the community, Ella Florence Underwood (1850–1950), died on June 25, 1950, in Kenwood, New York, near Oneida, New York.

== Notable members ==
- Charles J. Guiteau (September 8, 1841 – June 30, 1882), who assassinated James A. Garfield, the 20th president of the United States
- Pierrepont Noyes (August 18, 1870 – April 15, 1959), son of John Humphrey Noyes and head of Oneida Limited after his father

== Legacy ==
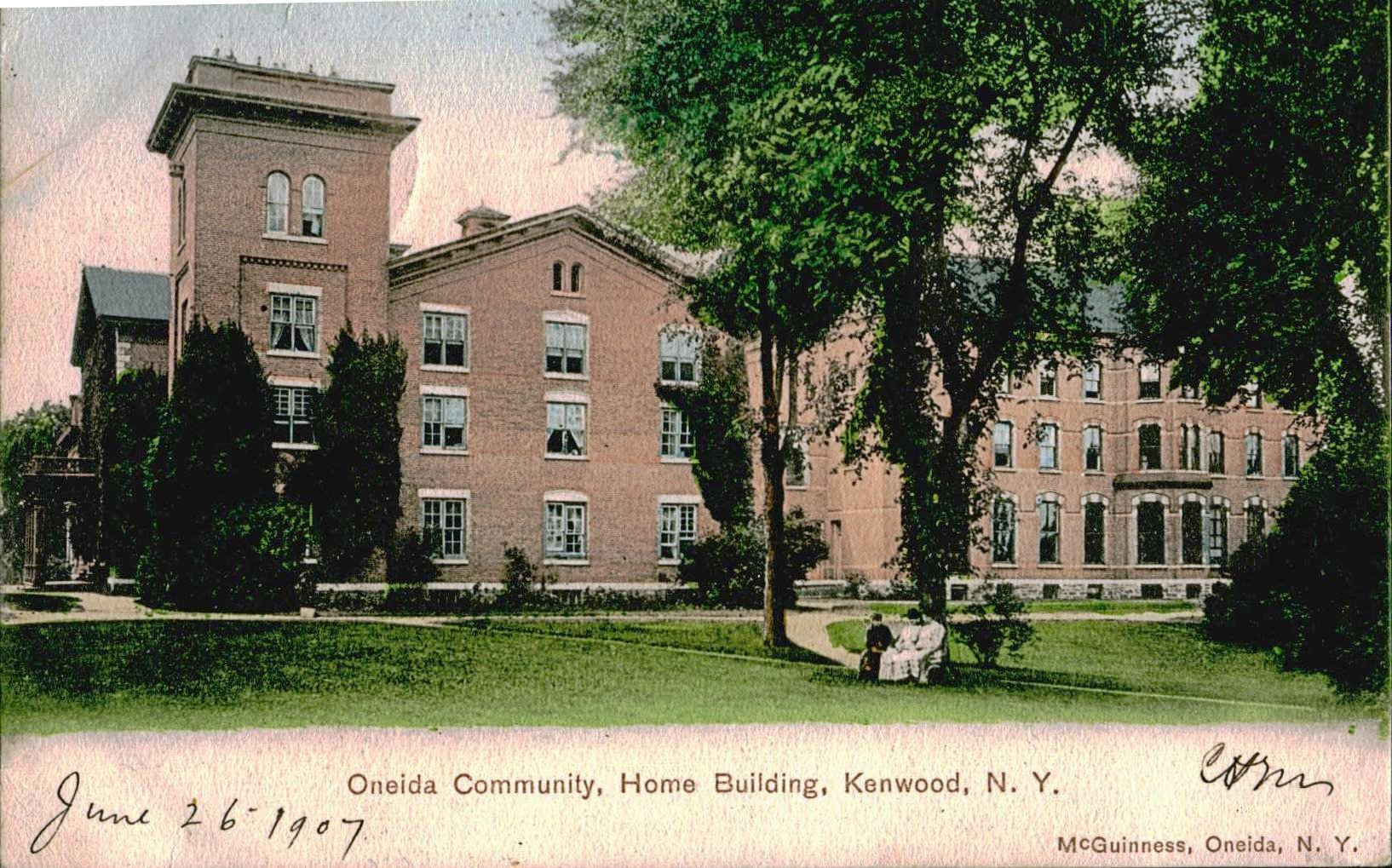
From a 1907 postcard

Many histories and first-person accounts of the Oneida Community have been published since the commune dissolved itself. Among those are: The Oneida Community: An Autobiography, 1851–1876 and The Oneida Community: The Breakup, 1876–1881, both by Constance Noyes Robertson; Desire and Duty at Oneida: Tirzah Miller's Intimate Memoir and Special Love/Special Sex: An Oneida Community Diary, both by Robert S. Fogarty; Without Sin by Spencer Klaw; Oneida, From Free Love Utopia to the Well-Set Table by Ellen Wayland-Smith; and biographical/autobiographic accounts by once-members including Jessie Catherine Kinsley, Corinna Ackley Noyes, George Wallingford Noyes, and Pierrepont B. Noyes.

An account of the Oneida Community is found in Sarah Vowell's book Assassination Vacation. It discusses the community in general and the more than five-year membership of Charles J. Guiteau – who later assassinated President James A. Garfield – in the community. The perfectionist community in David Flusfeder's novel Pagan House (2007) is directly inspired by the Oneida Community. There is a residential building called "Oneida" at the Twin Oaks Community in Virginia. Twin Oaks, an intentional community, names its buildings after defunct intentional communities.

=== Oneida Community Mansion House ===
The Oneida Community Mansion House was listed as a National Historic Landmark in 1965, and the principal surviving material culture of the Oneida Community consists of those landmarked buildings, object collections, and landscape. The five buildings of the Mansion House, separately designed by Erastus Hamilton, Lewis W. Leeds, and Theodore Skinner, comprise 93,000-square-foot (8,600 m^{2}) on a 33-acre site. This site has been continuously occupied since the community's establishment in 1848, and the existing Mansion House has been inhabited since 1862. Today, the Oneida Community Mansion House is a non-profit educational organization chartered by the State of New York. It welcomes visitors throughout the year with guided tours, programs, and exhibits. It preserves, collects, and interprets the intangible and material culture of the Oneida Community and related themes of the 19th and 20th centuries. The Mansion House also houses residential apartments, overnight guest rooms, and meeting spaces.

== See also ==
- Christian communism – Form of communism based on the life and teachings of Jesus Christ
- Eugenic feminism – Areas of the women's suffrage movement which overlapped with eugenics
- Harriet Hayes Skinner – American writer and editor (1817–1893)
- List of American utopian communities
- Mormonism – Doctrine in the Latter Day Saint movement
- New religious movement – Religious community or spiritual group of modern origin
