= John Humphrey Noyes =

American utopian community founder (1811–1886)

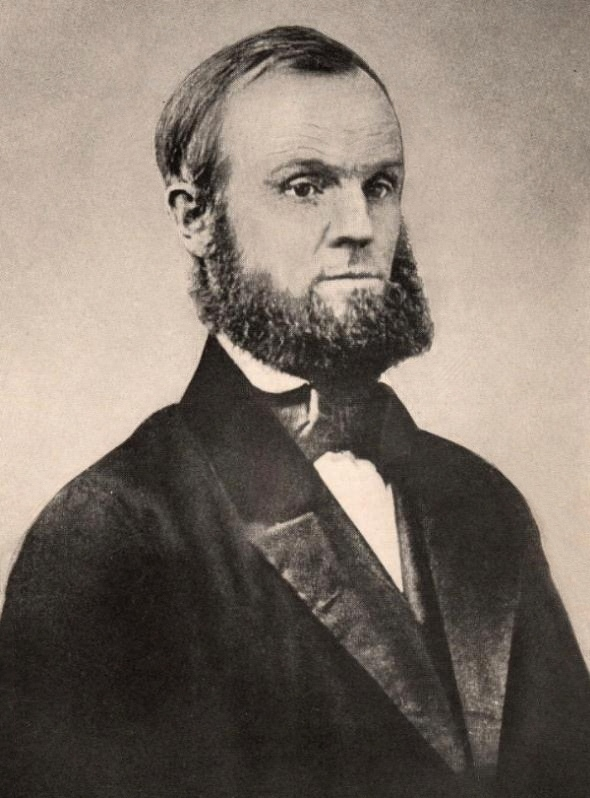
- Noyes, c. 1850
- Born: September 3, 1811; Brattleboro, Vermont
- Died: April 13, 1886 (aged 74); Niagara Falls, Ontario
- Education: Dartmouth College
- Occupation: Utopian socialist
- Known for: Oneida Community
- Spouse: Harriet Holton (m. 1838)
- Children: 9, including Pierrepont
- Father: John Noyes
- Relatives: Harriet H. Skinner (sister)

John Humphrey Noyes (September 3, 1811 – April 13, 1886) was an American preacher, radical religious philosopher, and utopian socialist. He founded utopian communities at Putney, Vermont; Oneida, New York; and Wallingford, Connecticut, and is credited with coining the term complex marriage.

== Biography ==
=== Early years ===
Noyes was born September 3, 1811, in Brattleboro, Vermont, to John Noyes, who worked variously as a minister, teacher, businessman, and member of the U.S. House of Representatives; and to Polly Noyes (née Hayes), aunt to Rutherford B. Hayes, later the 19th president of the United States.

In 1831, at the age of 20, Noyes was influenced by the preaching of Charles Grandison Finney, a leader in the Second Great Awakening. Noyes underwent a religious conversion. "My heart was fixed on the millennium, and I resolved to live or die for it", Noyes later recalled. He graduated from Dartmouth College shortly thereafter and dropped plans to study law, instead enrolling at Andover Theological Seminary with a view to entering the Christian ministry.

In the fall of 1832, Noyes left Andover to enter the Yale Theological Seminary so that he could devote more time to Bible study. In addition to attending daily lectures and practicing his preaching technique, Noyes began to dip his toe into political activism, helping to organize in New Haven one of the first Anti-Slavery Societies in the United States.

While in his second year at Yale, Noyes made what he considered a major theological discovery. While attempting to determine the date of the second coming of Christ, Noyes concluded that the event had already occurred, in 70 AD, and that therefore "mankind was now living in a new age".

This led Noyes to become increasingly concerned with salvation from sin and with perfection. He began to argue that only those who were perfect and free of sin were true Christians, and to proclaim that he "did not sin".

In 1838, Noyes married Harriet Holton. Initially, the couple had a traditional Christian marriage. In the first six years of the marriage, Harriet gave birth five times, but just one child survived, as the rest were born prematurely. These experiences led Noyes to study sexual intercourse in marriage. In May 1846, Noyes became romantically attracted to the wife of George Cragin, an early convert. He persuaded the Cragins and Mrs. Noyes to merge their unions into a "complex marriage" in which both men were married to both women, such that they could have sex together. The two couples moved into a common house that same year. Noyes spent the next few years developing his ideas on male continence. In mid-1847, he and some of his male converts began extending the scope of complex marriage to female converts, including several village widows and young women. This led to the October 1847 indictment of Noyes for "adulterous fornication". After he was arraigned in court, Noyes absconded to New York, where in 1848 he and his followers founded the Oneida Community.

=== Perfectionist leader ===
Charles Grandison Finney, who had influenced Noyes' conversion, advocated the idea of Christian perfectionism, that it was possible to be free of sin in this lifetime, which Noyes took up with fervor. His statements on this doctrine caused his friends to think him unbalanced, and he began to be called a heretic by his own professors. From the moment of his conversion, Noyes maintained that because he had surrendered his will to God, everything he chose to do was perfect because his choices "came from a perfect heart". His theory centered on the idea that the fact that man had an independent will was because of God and that this independent will came from God, therefore rendering it divine. The only way to control mankind's will was with spiritual direction. Noyes proclaimed that "it was impossible for the Church to compel man to obey the law of God, and to send him to eternal damnation for his failure to do so."

Noyes claimed that "his new relationship to God canceled out his obligation to obey traditional moral standards or the normal laws of society." As a result, Noyes started acting on impulses from his intuition rather than giving thought to the actions or consequences. On February 20, 1834, he declared himself perfect and free from sin. This declaration caused an outrage at his college, and his newly earned license to preach was revoked.

Upon his expulsion from Yale and the revocation of his ministerial license, he returned to Putney, Vermont, where he continued to preach, declaring, "I took away their license to sin and they go on sinning; they have taken away my license to preach but I shall go on preaching." The Putney community began to take shape. It started in 1836 as the Putney Bible School and became a formal communal organization in 1844, practicing complex marriage, male continence, and striving for perfection.

Residents at Putney included Almira Edson, who was expelled from the community upon her marriage, which was not sanctioned by Noyes.

=== Oneida Community ===
On October 26, 1847, Noyes was arrested for adultery, but was "released until his trial before the County Court in April next," according to Harriet H. Skinner's October 29, 1847 letter to her mother. Upon receiving word that arrest warrants had been issued for several of his loyal followers, the group left Vermont for Oneida, New York, where Noyes knew some friendly Perfectionists with land. They settled there, and built their first communal dwelling in 1848, followed by the Mansion House.

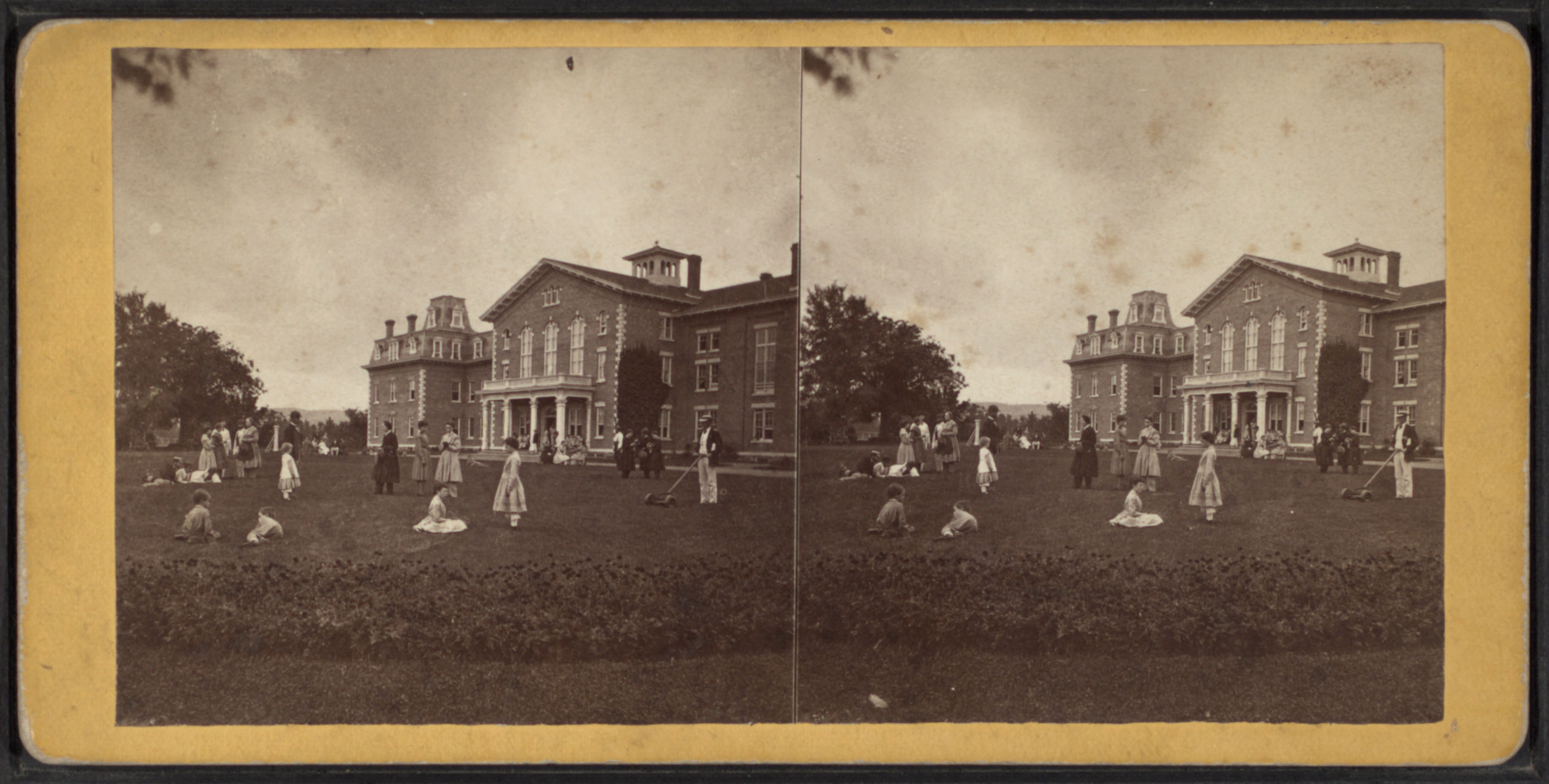
The Mansion House and community members in a 19th-century stereoview

The Oneida Community, as it came to be known, existed until 1881. It grew to have a membership of over 300, with branch communities in Brooklyn, New York; Wallingford, Connecticut; and Newark, New Jersey. The Community supported itself through many successful industries. They manufactured animal traps and silk thread, and grew and canned fruits and vegetables. Smaller industries included the manufacture of leather travel bags and palm-leaf hats. Their most successful trade was that of silverware.

==== Male continence and complex marriage ====
The Oneida community's utopian philosophy focused on the individual relationship to God; it was intended to be a sort of "kingdom of God on earth." The second focus of the community was sexual morality. Noyes found masturbation and the practice of man to sow seeds that he did not wish to grow to be unnatural. Noyes identified three functions of the sexual organs: the urinary, the propagative, and the amative. Noyes believed in the separation of the amative from the propagative, and he put amative sexual intercourse on the same footing with other ordinary forms of social interchange. Sexual intercourse as Noyes defines it is the insertion of the penis into the vagina; ejaculation is not a requirement for sexual intercourse. Noyes found ordinary sexual intercourse to be:

a momentary affair, terminating in exhaustion and disgust. If it begins in the spirit, it soon ends in the flesh; i. e., the amative, which is spiritual, is drowned in the propagative, which is sensual. The exhaustion which follows naturally breeds self-reproach and shame, and this leads to dislike and concealment of the sexual organs, which contract disagreeable associations from the fact that they are the instruments of pernicious excess. This undoubtedly is the philosophy of the origin of shame after the fall. Adam and Eve first sunk the spiritual in the sensual, in eating the forbidden fruit; and then, having lost the true balance of their natures, they sunk the spiritual in the sensual in their intercourse with each other, by pushing prematurely beyond the amative to the propagative, and so became ashamed, and began to look with an evil eye on the instruments of their folly.

Intercourse was spiritual; masturbation and the practice of intercourse without intention to propagate was shameful and wasteful. Noyes' theory of male continence consisted of analyzing sexual intercourse, recognizing in it two distinct acts, the social and the propagative. Noyes believed this to be practical and believed that a man should be content with avoiding the pleasure except when procreation is a desired result. Noyes believed sex limited to traditional Christian marriage practices left most young people facing sexual starvation from puberty (which according to Noyes was 14) to the age of marriage (which was about 24). Noyes' solution was that the young men in the community would practice with the women of the community who had already gone through menopause, until they were able to control their ejaculation. Only Noyes and a few other men had the skills and self-control necessary to participate in sexual intercourse with the young women of the community. Sexual intercourse was communal, it was based on consent, and all sexual unions were documented and regulated. Sexual intercourse was spiritual, and the pairing of man and woman for sexual intercourse in the community had to be approved by a committee, although most of the virgin females of the community were reserved for Noyes. Noyes did believe that women had the right to choose if and when to bear a child, which was not a common belief at the time. Noyes also addressed the medical arguments in response to his practices:

in regard to the injurious effects of Male Continence, which have been anticipated and often predicted, the Community has to report, in general, that they have not been realized. For example: It is seriously believed by many that nature requires a periodical and somewhat frequent discharge of the seed, and that the retention of it is liable to be injurious. Even if this were true, it would be no argument against Male Continence, but rather an argument in favor of masturbation; for it is obvious that before marriage men have no lawful method of discharge but masturbation; and after marriage it is as foolish and cruel to expend one's seed on a wife merely for the sake of getting rid of it, as it would be to fire a gun at one's best friend merely for the sake of unloading it.

All the members of the community lived in their communal home, which made keeping track of sexual intercourse much easier. After sexual intercourse individuals were required to return to their own rooms.

The Community's practice of birth control meant that for many years the birthrate was low. Any children born into the community were raised by the community and not in the tradition of family.

=== Exile ===
In June 1879, one of Noyes' most loyal followers alerted him that he was about to be arrested for statutory rape. In the middle of the night, Noyes fled Oneida for Ontario, Canada, where the Community had a factory. In August, he wrote back to the Community, stating that it was time to abandon the practice of complex marriage and live in a more traditional manner. The Community formally dissolved and converted to a joint stock company on January 1, 1881.

Although Noyes never returned to the United States, he remained a powerful influence over many of his followers. Some even left Oneida to come to the Niagara Falls area. Jessie Catherine Kinsley, entertaining marriage proposals from two young men, wrote to Noyes for his advice. When Noyes advised her to reject both proposals and take up with Myron Kinsley—the follower who had tipped him off to his impending arrest, and a man twenty years her senior—she took Noyes' advice.

=== Death and legacy ===
John Humphrey Noyes died in Niagara Falls, Ontario, on April 13, 1886. His body was returned to Oneida and is buried in the Oneida Community Cemetery with those of many of his followers.

In the early decades of the 20th century, Noyes' son Pierrepont consolidated the Community's industries and focused solely on silverware production. The company became known as Oneida Limited and was the largest producer of flatware in the world for much of the 20th century. The Community's second communal dwelling, the 93,000-square-foot (8,600 m^{2}) brick "mansion house", survives today as a multi-use facility encompassing a museum, apartments, dormitory housing, guest rooms, and meeting and banquet facilities.

== Works by John H. Noyes ==
- The Berean: a manual for the help of those who seek the faith of the primitive church (1847)
- Bible Communism (1848)
- Male Continence (1848)
- History of American Socialisms (1870) (republished in 1966 by Dover Publications under title Strange Cults and Utopias of 19th Century America available online: https://www.connexions.org/CxLibrary/CX6587.htm)
- Scientific Propagation (1873)
- Home Talks (1875)
- Mutual Criticism (1876)

== See also ==
- Free love
- Oneida stirpiculture
- Bible Communists
- Charles J. Guiteau
