= Lenox (company) =

American bone china manufacturer

Lenox Corporation
- Type: Private
- Industry: Manufacturing
- Founded: 1889
- Headquarters: Bristol, Pennsylvania
- Products: Tableware and giftware
- Brands: Gorham, Lenox, Oneida, Reed & Barton
- Parent: Centre Lane Partners
- Website: www.lenox.com

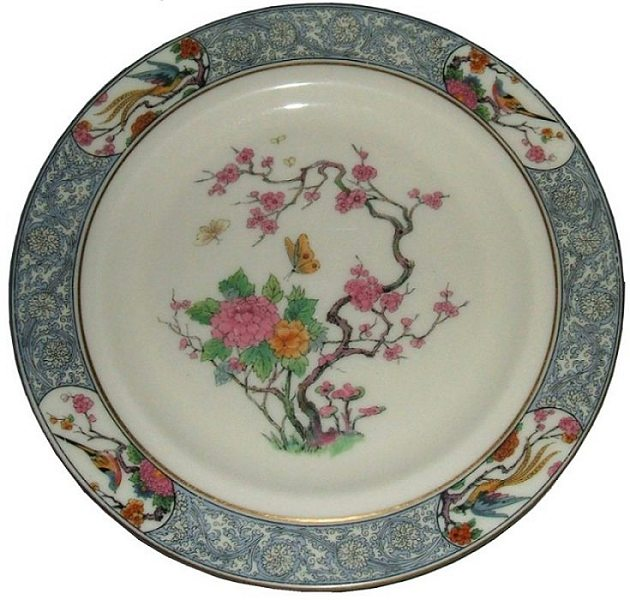
Lenox "Ming" fired in 1929 (discontinued)

Lenox Corporation is an American import company that sells tableware, giftware, and collectible products under the Lenox, Reed & Barton, Gorham, and Oneida brands. For most of the 20th century, it was the most prestigious American maker of tableware, and the company produced other decorative pieces as well. Several Lenox china services have been commissioned for the White House. By 2020, it was the last significant manufacturer of bone china in the United States, until the COVID-19 pandemic forced the closure of the company's only remaining American factory.

== History ==
Lenox was founded in 1889 by Walter Scott Lenox as Lenox's Ceramic Art Company in Trenton, New Jersey.

As Lenox's products became popular in the early 20th century, the company expanded its production to a factory-style operation, making tableware in standard patterns while still relying on skilled handworking, especially for painting.

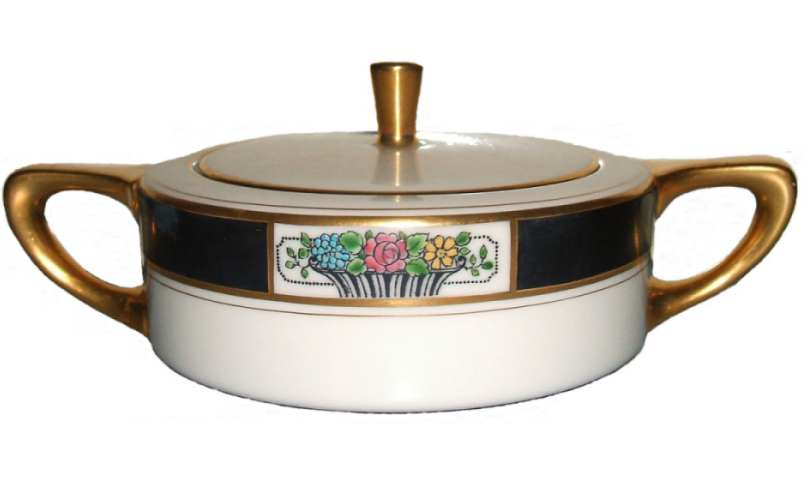
Lenox blank band bone china with floral inlay cir. 1932

Two of the first patterns Lenox produced were introduced in 1917, the "Ming" and "Mandarin", which were eventually manufactured for over fifty years. Lenox products also became well known in the United States thanks to Frank Graham Holmes, chief designer from 1905 to 1954, who won several artistic awards such as the 1927 Craftsmanship Medal of the American Institute of Architects and the 1943 silver medal of the American Designers Institute. Lenox pieces were the only American porcelain chosen for display in 1928 by the National Museum of Ceramics in Sèvres, France.

In 1983, Lenox was acquired by Brown-Forman Corporation. Brown-Forman acquired Dansk Designs and its Gorham Manufacturing Company division in 1991, which were incorporated into Lenox. In 2005, Brown-Forman sold Lenox, Incorporated, to collectible manufacturer Department 56 for $190 million.

The Lenox company archives, not purchased by Department 56, were donated to several repositories. China-related archival documents were donated to the Rutgers University Libraries. The historical china collections were given to the Newark Museum and the New Jersey State Museum.

Lenox Sales, Inc., filed for Chapter 11 bankruptcy in 2008. On March 16, 2009, Clarion Capital Partners purchased the assets of Lenox and renamed the company Lenox Corporation. Lenox continued some manufacture of bone china dinnerware at its plant in Kinston, North Carolina, built in 1989. The 218,000-square-foot (20,300 m^{2}) plant is situated on 40 acres (160,000 m^{2}). Its manufacturing capabilities included enamel dot, etch, color, and microwave metals, and eventually became Lenox's only American factory until its closure in 2020.

In a bankruptcy auction conducted in April 2015, the operating assets of Reed & Barton, a competing maker of flatware, were acquired by Lenox.

Lenox's brands include Kate Spade New York, Marchesa by Lenox, and Brian Gluckstein by Lenox.

Lenox ceased production at the Kinston factory on March 18, 2020, due to concerns over the COVID-19 pandemic; on April 17 the company announced that the closure would become permanent, with production expected to resume overseas.

In July 2020 Lenox announced that they would permanently close all of their outlet and warehouse stores, also citing the COVID-19 pandemic.

In October 2020, Lenox was acquired by private equity firm Centre Lane Partners.

In June 2021, Lenox acquired its erstwhile competitor Oneida.

== Presidential collection ==
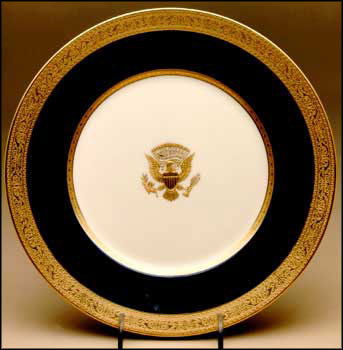
The Wilson service, introduced in 1918, was the first American-made presidential bone china service.

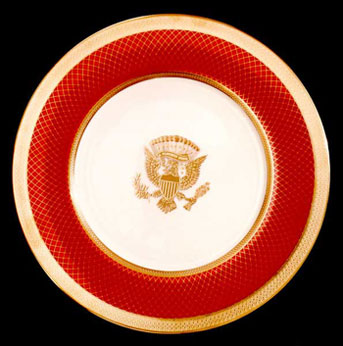
The Reagan service, introduced in 1982, was modeled on Woodrow Wilson's and selected by Nancy Reagan.

Lenox was the first North American bone china to be used in the White House, and the company has since made tableware for six U.S. presidents. They are officially titled:

- The Wilson Service: Designed by Frank Holmes. Delivered to the White House between August and November 1918. The pattern is a deep ivory border surrounding a brighter ivory body and two bands of matte gold encrusted with stars, stripes and other motifs. This first set of American made tableware of 1,700 pieces from Lenox cost $16,000.
- The Roosevelt Service: Ordered October 1934. It is described as patriotic, bearing a border of 48 gold stars, and the presidential seal in enamel colors on an ivory body.
- The Truman Service: Consisting of 1,572 pieces, the pattern includes a border of celadon green flanked by an etched gold band and a 24 karat gold rim on an ivory body. Delivered in early 1952.
- The Reagan Service: The pattern are bands of scarlet varying in width depending on the scale of the piece and are framed on each side with etched gold. The presidential seal, in raised gold, partially overlays the red border.
- The Clinton Service: The pattern features a border of pale creamy yellow, and images of the White House facades. Each piece in the place setting is decorated with a different pattern, the motifs derived from architectural elements found in the State Dining Room, East Room, and Diplomatic Reception Room. No presidential seal appears.
- The Bush Service: Laura Bush first displayed this newest service on January 7, 2009. The porcelain place setting service features a green basket weave border based on a French dinner service believed to have been owned by James and Dolley Madison. The dessert plates replicate a laurel wreath found on Madison's Parisian c. 1799-1805 dinner plates. The serving plates and the rim of other pieces also feature an eagle emblem inspired by an American bald eagle inlay found on the center drawer of the Massachusetts sideboard, believed to have been owned by Daniel Webster.
