= Kenwood, New York =

Hamlet in New York, United States

Coordinates: 43.0602°N 75.6049°W

Kenwood, New York is a hamlet in Madison County, New York, near Oneida, New York, and Sherrill, New York. Oneida Creek is the boundary separating Madison and Oneida Counties. Kenwood, west of Oneida Creek, includes, the Oneida Community Mansion House, a National Historic Landmark.
