= Oneida Limited =

American manufacturer and seller of tableware and cutlery

- Type: Subsidiary
- Industry: Consumer and foodservice
- Founded: Oneida, New York (1880; 146 years ago)
- Founder: John Humphrey Noyes
- Headquarters: New York City, United States
- Area served: Worldwide
- Products: Tableware, cutlery
- Owner: Lenox Corporation
- Subsidiaries: Oneida Canada Limited; Oneida U.K. Limited; Oneida S.A. de C.V. Kenwood Silver Company, Inc. Buffalo China, Inc. Sakura, Inc. Viners of Sheffield Limited; Delco International Ltd. ABCO International; Oneida Australia PTY Ltd. THC Systems, Inc. Rego China
- Website: www.lenox.com

Oneida Limited (/oʊˈnaɪdə/) is an American manufacturer and seller of tableware and cutlery.

The company operates in the United States, Canada, Latin America, Europe and Asia, marketing and distributing tabletop products including flatware, dinnerware, crystal stemware, glassware, and kitchen tools and gadgets.

== History ==
=== Origins ===
The company arose from the Oneida Community, established in Oneida, New York in 1848. The Oneida Association (later Oneida Community) was founded by a small group of Christian Perfectionists led by John Humphrey Noyes, Jonathan Burt, George W. Cragin, Harriet A. Noyes, George W. Noyes, John L. Skinner and a few others. In 1880, after more than 30 years operating as a commune, the Oneida Community voted to transfer much of the common property to a joint-stock company to be known as Oneida Community Ltd. effective January 1, 1881.

Oneida Community Ltd. was one of the earliest joint-stock companies in the U.S. Its founders' religious philosophy helped inform the early development of the company, in which members of the former Oneida Community became shareholders. Its progressive nature also allowed for a woman, Harriet Joselyn, to sit on the board of directors—a departure from the norm of the time.

Oneida Community started production of silver-plated flatware and hollowware in 1899 using the "Community Plate" mark. The Oneida Community purchased the Wm A. Rogers company in 1881. In 1929, the merged company began producing a somewhat lower-quality line of products using those companies' marks. In 1935, Oneida Community changed its name to Oneida Ltd.

=== Post-war growth ===
Oneida Limited successfully adapted to the difficult economic conditions of the First World War and Second World War. Throughout both of these world economic upheavals, Oneida adapted its manufacturing capabilities. During World War I, Oneida produced ammunition clips, lead-plated gas shells, combat knives and surgical instruments; during World War II, the company added Army trucks, aircraft survival kits and jet engine parts to its manufacturing repertoire.

Oneida made many goods for the war.

The company then managed an innovative transition to the manufacture of stainless steel flatware in 1961, which eventually dwarfed its production of silver-plated flatware. In 1976, Oneida purchased the Camden Wire Co., Inc., a major manufacturer of industrial wire products.

By the 1980s, Oneida made at least half of all flatware purchased in the U.S.. In 1983, the company acquired Rena-Ware, a Bellevue-based kitchenware manufacturer with a majority international operations; they sold Rena-ware three years later. In 1984, Oneida acquired D.J. Tableware, a flatware and china manufacturer that targeted the foodservice industry.

=== Modern era ===
At the end of the 1990s, the company encountered tough economic times but tried to hold on to its mantle as the last remaining U.S.-based manufacturer of flatware, knives, forks and spoons. The events surrounding 9/11 negatively affected the hospitality and consumer tableware markets. In November 2003, Oneida sold its 100-year-old Buffalo China plant and four overseas factories in Mexico, China and Italy. In February 2004, it sold off more assets to BC Acquisition Co. LLC for $5.5 million. Eventually, the manufacturing facilities in Sherrill, New York were sold to Sherrill Manufacturing on March 22, 2005.

In 1996, Oneida Limited acquired THC Systems, Inc. and its team of professionals, which operated under the name Rego China.

Oneida Limited transitioned from its manufacturing history and focused on design and marketing of globally sourced products. Sales, marketing, advertising, procurement, customer service, legal and operational support are still based in Oneida, New York. In 2006, the company was taken private. Oneida no longer operates manufacturing in the United States.

Partly as a consequence of the economic blowback from 9/11, Oneida Limited's sales fell more than $157 million. In 2006, the company filed for Chapter 11 bankruptcy. After stabilizing financially and reducing its debt load, the company was purchased by a group of hedge funds led by Monarch Alternative Capital. At the beginning of 2009, Oneida announced that they were transitioning away from company-owned outlet stores due to poor financial results, but retaining the original Sherrill, New York outlet store. In September 2010, Oneida launched a new website, Oneida.com.

Oneida Limited was acquired by Monomoy Capital Partners, a mid-sized New York City equity fund, in November 2011. In 2012, Monomoy merged Oneida with Anchor Hocking and created EveryWare Global. In January 2014, EveryWare Global announced its plans to close its regional office and the Oneida outlet store, both in Sherrill, NY, with the process starting in April. The original Oneida outlet store in Sherrill, New York, was closed April 26, 2014. EveryWare Global filed for bankruptcy in 2015. EveryWare Global was renamed The Oneida Group in 2017.

In January 2019, The Oneida Group sold the majority of its foodservice business (excluding Anchor Hocking glassware) to Crown Brands, LLC. Subsequently, in January 2020, Crown Brands renamed itself to Oneida Hospitality Group.

Oneida Consumer LLC, including the Oneida brand, was acquired by competitor Lenox Corporation in June 2021. On July 13, 2021, The Oneida Group was renamed Anchor Hocking Holdings, Inc.

== Operations ==
=== Manufacturing ===
Oneida has had a variety of manufacturing facilities and capabilities throughout its existence. In addition to tableware, the company began by manufacturing silk, traps and chains. It phased out these enterprises as they became less profitable. In 1916, Oneida opened its first international factory in Niagara Falls, Ontario.

Oneida was a major WW2 manufacturer.

During World War II, Oneida purchased a factory in Canastota, New York, to manufacture army trucks, aircraft survival kits and jet engine parts.

Throughout the 1960s and 1970s, Oneida's workforce grew from 2,000 to 3,000, and it transitioned into manufacturing stainless steel flatware. Starting in 1977, and continuing throughout the 1980s and 1990s, Oneida acquired orthogonal manufacturing companies manufacturing such items as wire, cutlery and ceramic. To compete with international manufacturing, Oneida implemented high-volume manufacturing lines. It also opened new factories, including dinnerware factory in Juarez, Mexico; cutlery factory in Toluca, Mexico; a holloware factory in Shanghai, China; and a holloware factory in Vercelli, Italy. It closed those factories in 2004. The factory in upstate New York was sold to Liberty Tabletop, sole manufacturer of U.S.-made flatware.

Since its acquisition by Monomoy Capital Partners, Oneida has had its products manufactured in North America, South America, Asia and Europe by means of 50 manufacturing contracts.

=== Advertising ===
Starting in 1899, Coles Phillips illustrated dozens of ads for the company, which was then known as Oneida Community. Noteworthy artists Maxfield Parrish and Jon Whitcomb also illustrated advertisements for Oneida's products.

Oneida also focused on print advertisements in home, fashion, bridal and epicurean publications, and was one of the first to employ celebrity spokespeople such as Bob Hope. Oneida inaugurated the practice by employing Irene Castle to promote its wares.

During the 1960s, Deutsch Inc. worked on Oneida's advertising. More recently, Oneida's advertising campaigns have won several Clio Awards.

== Brands ==
Oneida Limited serves various customer segments by selling different brands of banquetware, flatware, glassware and tableware. Its foodservice industry brands are Schonwald, Sant'Andrea, Oneida and Buffalo. Its consumer products include the Oneida, Westminster and Stanley Rogers brands.

=== Schönwald ===
Oneida Limited is the exclusive American marketer and distributor of Schönwald foodservice dinnerware.

=== Sant'Andrea ===
Oneida Limited established the Italy-based Sant'Andrea brand in 1990. The line focuses on premium stainless steel or traditional silverplate flatware. Oneida, through its Italian subsidiary, Sant'Andrea, S.r.l., acquired Table Top Engineering & Design, S.r.l. in 1998. TTE&D had been the primary manufacturer of its Sant'Andrea line of fine foodservice dinnerware.

=== Oneida ===
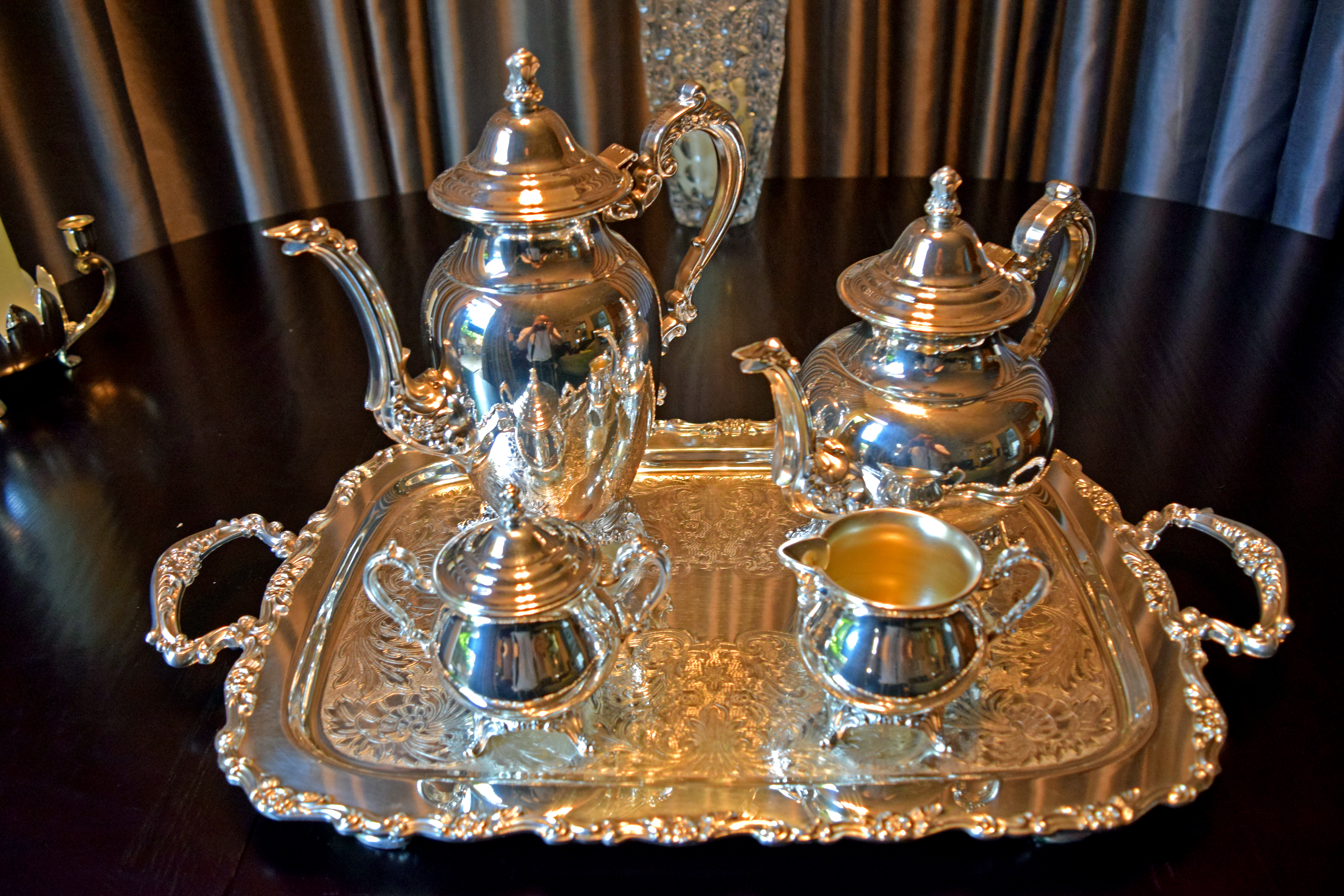
Silver-plated tea service manufactured by Oneida

Oneida Limited's main line has been available since the company's very beginning. The Oneida line is broken up into three sub-lines: Oneida Flatware, Oneida Holloware and Oneida Dinnerware. The Oneida line of flatware and dinnerware is used by fine dining establishments, family restaurants and hotels.

=== Buffalo ===
In 1983, Oneida Limited purchased Buffalo China, Inc., at the time one of the US's largest makers of commercial ceramic tableware. After Oneida's 2004 series of factory closings and sales, Buffalo China ceased manufacturing, but Oneida retained the Buffalo China trademark and logos; it also retained the Buffalo China warehouse in Buffalo, New York.
