= Sexual vampire =

Sexual acts

Caizhan

Chinese name
- Traditional Chinese: 採戰
- Simplified Chinese: 采战
- Literal meaning: battle of [sexual energy] absorption
Transcriptions
Standard Mandarin
- Hanyu Pinyin: cǎizhàn
- Wade–Giles: ts'ai^{3}chan^{4}
Yue: Cantonese
- Yale Romanization: tsǎijàn
- Jyutping: coi^{2}zin^{3}
Middle Chinese
- Middle Chinese: tshojX tsyenH
Old Chinese
- Baxter–Sagart (2014): *s.r̥ˤəʔ tar-s

Korean name
- Hangul: 채전
- Hanja: 採戦
Transcriptions
- Revised Romanization: chae jeon

Japanese name
- Kanji: 採戦
- Kana: さいせん
Transcriptions
- Romanization: saisen

A sexual vampire practiced esoteric Daoist sexual techniques where one partner purportedly strengthened their own body by absorbing the other partner's qi ("life force") and jing ("sexual energy") without emitting any of one's own. Practitioners believed that sexual vampirism could enable them to maintain eternal youth and become a Daoist xian ("transcendent; immortal"). However, an unwitting victim repeatedly subjected to sexual vampirism would supposedly weaken and die.

Myths about Chinese gods and immortals recount sexual vampires who allegedly became xian transcendents. For instance, after having sexual intercourse with 1,200 young women, the legendary Yellow Emperor achieved spiritual transcendence and ascended into heaven.

In Chinese erotic literature and sex manuals, intercourse is often metaphorically referred to as a "battle" or "war" of the sexes. This metaphor emphasizes the idea of one partner "defeating" the "enemy" through a Chinese: 採戰; pinyin: caizhan; trans. "battle of [sexual energy] absorption". These texts are predominantly written for a male audience, guiding men to defeat their female enemy in a "sexual battle" by mastering Daoist ejaculation control. The goal is to excite the female partner until she reaches orgasm and sheds her yin essence, which the male then absorbs.

Two Chinese mythological creatures are comparable to sex vampires. A jiangshi (殭屍; "stiff corpse; hopping vampire") kills people to absorb their qi ("life force"). A hulijing (狐狸精; "fox spirit") or jiuweihu (九尾狐; "nine-tailed fox") shapeshifts into a beautiful woman who seduces men to absorb their jing ("semen; sexual essence"). In both Chinese mythology and popular literature, the themes of vampires and "other monsters avid for sperm abound".

A Chinese sexual vampire is analogous to English terms like psychic vampire, energy vampire, succubus, or incubus. These mythical beings feed on human vital forces, similar to traditional vampires (sanguinarians or hematophages) who purportedly feed on blood.

== Theoretical background ==
The ancient Chinese belief in achieving immortality through predatory intercourse might appear outlandish to contemporary readers, but it is deeply rooted in traditional Chinese theories of qi (氣; "life force; vital breath; matter-energy"). Qi is considered the fundamental substance that animates all living beings and forms the basis of the universe. Within the human body, qi manifests through various aspects, including yin and yang, prevalent in women and men, respectively. At the moment of orgasm, people release a highly concentrated form of qi known as jing (精; "essence; sexual energy; vigor"). In men, jing is equated with semen, while in women, it is associated with vaginal lubrication or menstrual fluid.

Jing and qi are part of the Three Treasures in traditional Chinese medicine, along with shen (神; "spirit; deity; god"). In neidan ("internal alchemy") practices, these Three Treasures can be transmuted sequentially. Using the concept of xi (吸; "suck in, suck up; absorb; inhale, breathe in; attract, draw to oneself"), Daoist sexual techniques posited that by absorbing a partner's genital fluids without releasing one's own, one could increase one's store of qi at the expense of the partner, who could waste away and die if the technique was overused.

Chinese bedchamber manuals aimed to teach methods of inducing orgasms in sexual partners while preventing the leakage of one's vital liquids. In heterosexual intercourse, each partner would exchange their abundant aspect of qi with the other's, creating a healthy balance of yin and yang. However, in homosexual intercourse, partners would absorb the same aspect of qi they secreted, resulting in no net benefit to either.

The theory of vampiric intercourse involved "sucking in" a partner's secretions without emitting any qi, either by suppressing orgasm or through injaculation, to extend one's lifespan. Techniques such as coitus interruptus, coitus saxonicus (squeezing the base of the penis to induce retrograde ejaculation), and coitus reservatus (semen retention by pressing the perineum) were employed to achieve this goal.

Paul R. Goldin, a professor of Chinese Thought at the University of Pennsylvania, explains that two fundamental aspects of Chinese culture made belief in sexual vampirism possible. First, early Chinese views on sin did not consider sex sinful. Unless legally or religiously forbidden, partners were free to engage in any sexual activities they desired. This laissez-faire attitude allowed the consumption of sexual partners for nutritive purposes to be seen as no different from consuming food or medicine. Second, the "materialistic cosmology" of Chinese culture viewed people as containers of qi that a knowledgeable person could manipulate and consume for their benefit.

Ultimately, sexual vampires, along with the underlying Chinese concepts of qi life force and jing sexual energy, are pseudoscientific. "Why should one speak of ‘sexual vampirism’, even though the topic is largely neglected by our technical texts? Is this silence not precisely what reveals the outright imaginary character of the nourishing transfer? Texts on sexual body techniques are thus being silent, where literary, fictional texts fill in the blank space with the figure of dangerous fox ghosts that seduce men in human female appearance".

== Battle of the sexes ==
Some Daoist texts on sexual alchemy consider intercourse mainly as a means for attaining transcendence, and figuratively refer to it as a "battle". This metaphor is also common in Western literature, for example, Robin Baker's Sperm Wars. Distinctly Chinese is, however, the notion that the "victory" belongs to the sex partner who "succeeds in obtaining the other's vital essence thereby increasing one's supply of vital force".

The arcane term cǎizhàn (採戰), first recorded in the Song dynasty (960–1279), describes the practice of sexual vampirism in which one partner tries to obtain energies at the loss of the other. This word combines cǎi (采; 採), translatable as "pick, pluck, gather; cull, select, choose, adopt; extract, exploit; collect, cluster; bunch up, assemble"; and zhàn (戰), "battle, combat; fight with weapons; clash of arms; war; struggle, contend for". The unabridged monolingual Hanyu Da Cidian (Comprehensive Chinese Word Dictionary), which is lexicographically comparable to the Oxford English Dictionary, defines cǎizhàn (采战; 採戰) as yóu cǎibǔ (犹采补; 猶採補; "similar to caibu (采补; 採補)", with bu "mend or patch clothing; repair, restore; remedy, redress; improve, ameliorate; add to, supplement; supplete, supply (a deficiency); replenish …"), which in turn is defined as 谓汲取他人元气, 精血以补益己身; "capturing/absorbing the energy, essence, and blood of others to nourish oneself".

Various English translations of caizhan (採戰) reflect its complexity:

- "plucking [of energy] in [amorous] combat"
- "gathering through battle"
- "plucking battle"
- "the battle of gathering"
- "reaping the rewards of battle"
- "battle of stealing essences"
- "battle of absorption"

Two sex-specific compounds related with caizhan are caiyin buyang (採陰補陽; "collecting yin and replenishing yang") for men and caiyang buyin (採陰補陽; "collecting yang and replenishing yin") for women.

The 2nd- or 3rd-century Sunü Jing (Classic of the Unsullied Woman) contains an early "sexual enemy" reference.

In engaging the enemy [御敵] a man should regard her as so much tiles or stone and himself as gold or jade. When his [jing] is aroused, he should immediately withdraw from her territory. One should mount [御] a woman as if riding a galloping horse with rotten reins or as if fearful of falling into a deep pit lined with knife blades. If you treasure your [jing], your life will have no limit.

The translator Wile notes that this phrase yudi (御敵) is a military and sexual double entendre for "to resist the enemy" and "to have intercourse".

The 5th- or 6th-century text Jiji zhenjing (既濟真經; "True Classic of the Complete Union") begins, "A superior general [Daoist adept] when he [sexually] engages the enemy [woman] will first concentrate on drawing out his opponent, and as it were suck and inhale the enemy's strength. He will adopt a completely detached attitude, resembling a man who closes his eyes in utter indifference." This metaphorical extension from martial to erotic terminology is appropriate because Chinese martial arts and sexual alchemy share two common judo-like principles: begin by yielding to one's opponent to catch them off balance; conserve one's force while utilizing that of the opponent.

== Yufang zhiyao and Yufang mijue ==
Queen Mother of the West, Yongle Temple murals, Yuan dynasty (1271–1368)

Two Han dynasty (202 BCE-220 CE) sex manuals, the Yufang zhiyao (玉房指要; "Essentials of the Jade Chamber") and Yufang mijue (Secrets of the Jade Chamber), offer insights into the complex and often sexist Chinese views of sexual vampirism. These texts are part of the broader category of fangzhongshu (房中術; '[bed]chamber techniques/arts'; "the art of lovemaking"). The Yufang zhiyao, like most Daoist texts predominantly describes male sex vampires, while the Yufang mijue uncommonly describes female ones. Both sexological classics, along with several others such as the Sunü Jing above, were lost in China by the end of the Tang dynasty in 907, but fortunately, they were preserved in Japan as part of Tambo Yasunori's (丹波康頼) 984 Chinese medical chrestomathy Ishinpō (医心方), and those recovered textual fragments were reconstructed in the early 20th century.

The Yufang zhiyao (Essentials of the Jade Chamber) emphasizes male sexual practices, and begins by quoting the mythical Chinese Methuselah Peng Zu,

The Yellow Emperor mounted 1,200 women and thus achieved immortality, whereas the ordinary man cuts down his life with just one. Is there not a great gap between knowledge and ignorance? Those who know the tao regret only having too few opportunities for mounting. It is not always necessary to have those who are beautiful, but simply those who are young, who have not yet borne children, and who are amply covered with flesh. If one can secure but seven or eight such women, it will be of great benefit.

There is no mystery to the tao of intercourse. It is simply to be free and unhurried and to value harmony above all. Fondle her dantian and "seek to fill her mouth." Press deeply into her and move ever so slightly to induce her [qi]. When the woman feels the influence of yang there are subtle signs. Her ears become hot as if she had drunk good wine. Her breasts swell and fill the whole hand when held. She moves her neck repeatedly while her feet agitate. Becoming passionate and alluring she suddenly clasps the man's body. At this moment, draw back slightly and penetrate her shallowly. The yang will then gain [qi] at the expense of the yin.

Kristofer Schipper described this gap between knowledge and ignorance as "a mixed bag of tricks, some rather funny, but in general frankly morbid".

The Yufang zhiyao (Secrets of the Jade Chamber) presents a unique perspective by describing female sexual vampirism for longevity, particularly through the figure of the Queen Mother of the West (西王母; Xiwangmu), who supposedly had intercourse with numerous young boys and consumed their yang life force, thereby cultivating her yin sexual energy and becoming a transcendent and famed goddess. Jolan Chang interprets this "somewhat apocryphal" story to indicate that the Queen Mother had all the characteristics of a vampire and conformed with the cross-cultural trope of the femme fatale (or "vamp", a clipping of "vampire").

Nevertheless, other passages in this same text follow the tradition of male-centric sexual vampirism. The one directly preceding the Queen Mother passage is an excellent example.

To frequently change female partners brings increased benefit. More than ten partners in one night is especially good. If one constantly has intercourse with the same woman, her [jingqi] will become weak, and this is not only of no great benefit to the man, but will cause her to become thin and emaciated."

The Daoist canonical tradition represents the Queen Mother of the West as the goddess of immortality who resides on mythical Mount Kunlun, where she served the famous Peaches of Immortality to human and divine guests. In stark contrast, the Yufang mijue sexually represents her as a woman who "attained eternal youth and transcendency through a combination of sexual techniques designed to suck the vitality from her male partners", which suggests that sexual vampirism will allow any woman who follows its instructions "to achieve transcendency at the cost of the ill-health of any man unfortunate enough to fall into her clutches."

It is not only yang that can be cultivated, but yin too. The Queen Mother of the West cultivated her yin and attained the [dao]. As soon as she had intercourse with a man he would immediately take sick, while her complexion would become radiant without the use of rouge or powder. She always ate curds and plucked the "five stringed lute" thereby harmonizing her heart, concentrating her mind, and was without any other desire. The Queen Mother had no husband but was fond of intercourse with young boys. Therefore, this cannot be an orthodox teaching; but can the Queen Mother be alone in this?

When having intercourse with men, you must calm the heart and still the mind. If the man is not yet fully aroused, you must wait for his [qi] to arrive and slightly restrain your emotion to attune yourself to him. Do not move or become agitated lest your [yinjing] become exhausted first. If your [yinjing] becomes exhausted first, this leaves one in a deficient state and susceptible to cold wind illnesses. …

If a woman knows the way of cultivating her yin and causing the two [qi] to unite harmoniously, then it may be transformed into a male child. If she is not having intercourse for the sake of offspring, she can divert the fluids to flow back into the hundred vessels. By using yang to nourish yin, the hundred ailments disappear, one's color becomes radiant and the flesh fine. One can enjoy long life and be forever like a youth. If a woman is able to master this [dao] and have frequent intercourse with men, she can fast for nine days without knowing hunger. Those who are sick and have sexual relations with ghosts are able to fast but become emaciated. How much more can we expect from intercourse with men?

According to Paul R. Goldin, this Yufang mijue sexual vampiristic account of the Queen Mother's "apotheosis is radically amoral, non-Daoist, and this-worldly". It is amoral because there is no suggestion that she "attained her divinity on account of moral excellence or virtuous conduct", and she was originally an ordinary woman, but was able to harness the "extraordinary power" afforded by Daoist sexual practices. This account is non-Daoist because it contradicts orthodox teachings. For instance, the early Way of the Celestial Master Xiang'er Daodejing commentary criticizes sexual techniques such as those given in the Secrets of the Jade Chamber.

The Way teaches human beings to congeal their essence and make spirits. In the present generation there are those who practice counterfeit arts and slyly call them the Way, teaching by means of the texts of the Yellow Emperor, the Dark Maiden, Master Gong, and Rongcheng. When engaged with a woman, they do not ejaculate, but think they can circulate their essence [through their bodies] and cause it to fortify their brains. But because their mind and spirit are not at one [with the Way], they lose what they try to preserve; though they store up their pleasure, they cannot treasure it for long.

And it is "this-worldly" or material immortality. Sexual vampirism was conceived as one of several "nourishing life" methods of attaining this-worldly immortality in China, along with neidan and waidan alchemy, dietary regimens, grain avoidance, daoyin gymnastics, meditation, embryonic breathing, and circulating breath.

The "Yufang zhiyao" and "Yufang mijue" offer valuable glimpses into the historical intersections of sexuality, health, and spirituality in Daoist traditions.

== Xia Ji ==
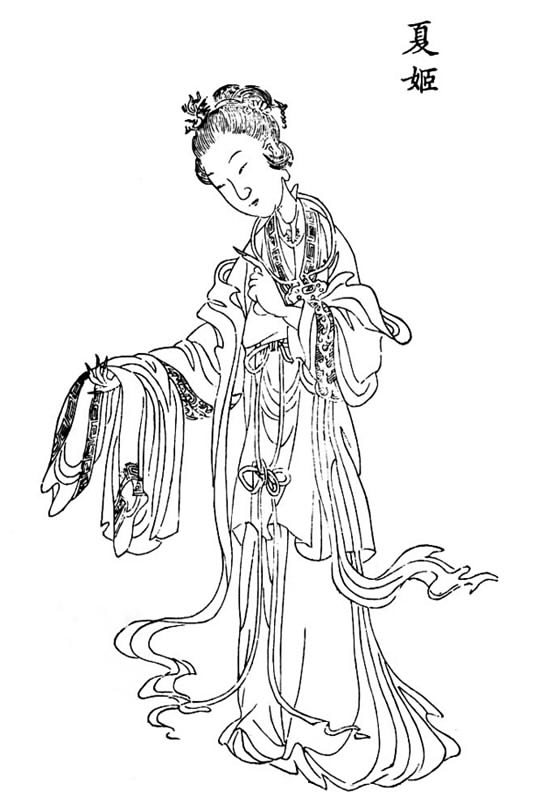
Xia Ji, 1870 Baimei xinyong tuzhuan (百美新詠圖傳; "New Illustrated Poems about 100 Beautiful Women")

[[File:陳靈公.png|thumb|Duke Ling of Chen (陳靈公), Kong Ning (孔寧), Xia Zhengshu ({{lang|zh|夏徵舒), and Yi Xingfu (儀行父), 1842 Xinkan gu lienu zhuan (新刊古列女傳; "New Edition of Ancient Biographies of Exemplary Women")]]

Xia Zhengshu assassinating Duke Ling of Chen in 599 BCE, 1919 Cibu congkan edition of Liu Xiang's Lienu zhuan (Biographies of Exemplary Women)

Lady Xia Ji (夏姬, fl. 600-589 BCE) was a legendarily beautiful seductress who had numerous lovers and several husbands. Chinese histories record that she openly engaged in group sex with Duke Ling of Chen (陳靈公, r. 613-599 BCE) and two of his court officials. Xia Zhengshu (夏徵舒), the son of Xia Ji and her husband Xia Yushu (夏御叔), subsequently killed the duke for joking about which of her sex partners was his biological father. According to the sinologist Olivia Milburn, Xia Ji was traditionally considered one of the "most wicked women of Chinese antiquity".

For centuries, Xia Ji was a literary Chinese trope for a femme fatale. For instance, theXi jing fu (西京賦; "Western Metropolis Rhapsody") by Zhang Heng (78–139 CE): "They snuggled together on a narrow mat in the center of the hall, And feathered goblets made the rounds countless times. Rarely seen dances were performed in succession; Marvelous talents showed off their skills. Their bewitching magic was more seductive than that of Xia Ji".David R. Knechtges says, "She was married seven times, and even in old age she attracted men."

Then in the late Ming dynasty (1368–1644), Xia Ji became the subject of a popular erotic novel. The c. 1610-1620 Zhulin yeshi (Unofficial History of the Bamboo Grove) portrayed her as using esoteric sexual vampirism to kill her lovers, each of whom she gradually sucked dry of vital energy, to maintain her eternal youth and become a Daoist transcendent.

In Chinese history, the earliest textual references to Xia Ji are from the c. 4th-century BCE Zuozhuan (Zuo's Commentary) to the c. 5th-century BCE Chunqiu (Spring and Autumn Annals) historical chronicle; compare the c. 18 BCE Lienu zhuan historical references to Xia Ji, discussed here. The missionary James Legge, the first English-language translator of the Zuozhuan, condemned Xia Ji as "Xia Zhengshu's mother, a widow, was a vile woman, and was carrying on a licentious connexion with the marquis of Chen and two of his ministers at the same time. The things which are related about the four are inexpressibly filthy."

The Zuozhuan entry for 600 BCE (Xuan 9) describes Xia Ji's infamous orgy in the court of Duke Ling of Chen (陳靈公, 613-599) with his officials Kong Ning (孔寧) and Yi Xingfu/Hangfu (儀行父).

Lord Ling of Chen together with Kong Ning and Yi Xingfu engaged in an illicit sexual relationship with Lady Xia Ji and they all wore her underwear in order to make a joke at court. Xie Ye [洩冶] remonstrated: "For a ruler and his ministers to announce their debauchery gives the people no model to follow and your reputation will be ruined. Your lordship should put an end to it." His lordship said: "I can reform [my behavior]." His lordship reported this to the two other men and they requested permission to kill him. His lordship did not forbid them to do so, so they murdered Xie Ye.

The entry for 599 BCE (Xuan 10) records that Xia Ji's son Zhengshu assassinated Duke Ling for joking that his father was not Yushu, but Ling, Kong, or Yi.

Lord Ling of Chen was drinking wine at the Xia house with Kong Ning and Yi Xingfu. His lordship said to Xingfu: "[Xia] Zhengshu looks like you." He replied: "He also looks like your lordship." [Xia] Zhengshu was enraged by this. His lordship went out, and [Xia Zhengshu] shot him dead from his stables. The two other men fled to Chu.

The Zuozhuan entry for 589 BCE (Cheng 2) narrates how both King Zhuang of Chu (r. 613-591 BCE) and his brother Prince Zifan (子反) were infatuated with Xia Ji and wanted to make her his concubine, but a harem official named Wu Chen (巫臣) successfully remonstrated against it. The king afterward presented her in marriage to a minor official named Xiang Lao (襄老), and after his death, she began having incestuous sex with her stepson Xiang Heiyao (襄黑要), who became her third husband. After Chu conquered Chen, King Zhuang sentenced Duke Ling's murderer Xia Zhengshu to death by julie (車裂; "attaching five chariots to a convict's head and four limbs and tearing him to pieces").

When Chu punished the Xia family of Chen, King Zhuang wanted to take Lady Xia Ji into his own harem. Shengong Wu Chen said: "You cannot do this. When you summoned the other lords, it was to punish the guilty. If you now take Lady Xia Ji into your own household, then you are greedy for her beauty. If you are greedy for her beauty, then you are debauched. Debauchery will result in terrible punishments. … Your majesty should consider this!" His majesty then stopped. Zifan wanted to take her. Wu Chen said: "This is an inauspicious person. It is she who made the Honorable Man die young, who killed Yushu, murdered Lord Ling, brought Xia [Zi]nan to the scaffold, forced Kong [Ning] and Yi [Xingfu] into exile and brought tragedy to the state of Chen. When has there been such an unlucky person? It is hard enough to survive; why should you suffer a premature demise? There are lots of beautiful women in the world, so why does it have to be this one?"

Milburn translates Ziman or Zi Man or (子蠻) as "Honorable Man"—where Man means a "southern ethnic group" rather than a "man"—and notes that Zuo zhuan commentators are divided about whether the name refers to Xia Ji's brother or her first husband. Du Yu suggested that Man (蠻) was the zi (字; "courtesy name") of Xia Ji's half-brother Lord Ling of Zheng (鄭靈公, r. 605 BCE) before his accession, however, another Zuozhuan context gives his courtesy name as Hao (貉). Compare "She brought [her brother] Ziman, to an early death". Yang Bojun hypothesized that Man was Xia Ji's previously unknown first husband, making Lord Yushu (御叔) her second, despite the absence of corroborating textual references to him.

Lastly, the harem official Wu Chen who advised King Zhuang and Prince Zifan against making Xia Ji a concubine, wanted to marry her himself and they fled to Jin and then Wu. In the Zuozhuan, "Lady Xia Ji married at least four times and had four recorded illicit sexual relationships, one of which was an incestuous affair with her stepson".

In Chinese literature, a Ming dynasty (1368–1644) erotic novel repopularized the femme fatale Xia Ji. The c. 1610-1620 Zhulin yeshi (Unofficial History of the Bamboo Grove) made Lady Xia Ji the basis for the main protagonist named Su'e (素娥), an allusion to the contemporary Ming pornographic novel Su'e pian (Chapters of Su'e). Set in around 600 BCE during the Spring and Autumn period (770-481 BCE), Su'e was a young unmarried woman who dreamed that the Daoist transcendent Hua Yue (華月) taught her esoteric techniques of love-making, and gave her a sex manual entitled Sunǚ caizhan zhi shu (素女採戰之術; "the Plain Girl's Arts for Reaping the Rewards of Battle").

A similar story is found in the c. 2nd-century CE Liexian Zhuan (Biographies of Exemplary Transcendents), which has the earliest known example of a woman "achieving first eternal youth and then transcendency through esoteric sexual practices with multiple partners". It records a woman named Nü Wan (女丸) or occasionally Nü Ji (女几) who learned esoteric sexual practices after an anonymous transcendent gave her a text entitled Sunǚ jing (素女經; "The Plain Girl's Classic"). The original Chinese reads: nei xie jishu, gai lao er fu zhuang zhe (內挾伎術 蓋老而復壯者; "[Lady Xia Ji] was someone who [had mastered] the techniques of internal compression, whereby even though she was old she could restore her youth").

First using her newfound sexual techniques to retain her youthful appearance throughout her life; she then seduced multiple men until she was stopped by a rival Daoist master who became her lover and joined her in their quest for spiritual transcendence. "Such themes were a staple of early Chinese erotic literature, and were closely related to a heterodox tradition in which the achievement of transcendency was completely divorced from moral cultivation."

In the course of the narrative every single man who has a sexual relationship with Lady Xia Ji dies. This theme might suggest that she is being portrayed as a kind of sexual vampire, draining vitality from the men with whom she has sex. However, the vampire motif is developed only in the case of her first two human sexual partners: her half-brother, the Honorable Man of Zheng, and her first husband. Subsequently, Lord Ling of Chen is murdered by Lady Xia Ji's irate son, Kong Ning and Yi Xingfu find themselves the victims of vengeful ghosts, her second husband dies in battle, his son is beheaded for the crime of committing incest with his stepmother, Wu Chen and Luan Shu (欒書) are both executed for the crime of wife-swapping.

In the novel's conclusion, Lady Xia Ji has acquired a disciple, a young woman of high social status like herself; the wife of the minister Luan Shu. This young woman is foolish enough to be tempted into a sexual relationship with Wu Chen, who victimized her, "Wu Chen being as much of a vampire as his wife."

== Van Gulik's influence ==
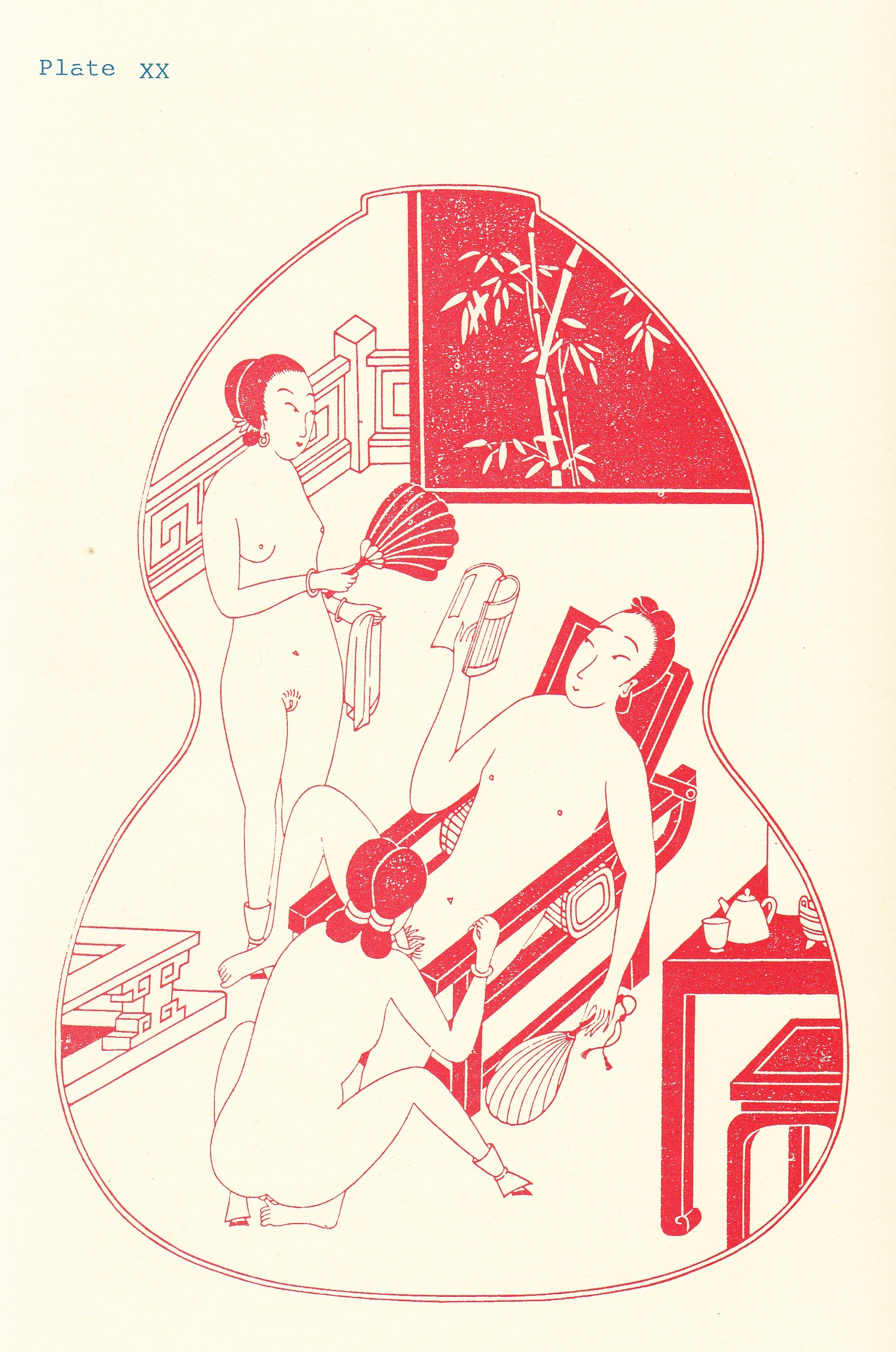
Erotic Ming dynasty woodblock print from c. 1640-1650 Jiangnan xiaoxia (江南銷夏; "Whiling Away the Summer South of the River")

Robert van Gulik, a Dutch diplomat, orientalist, and author, made significant contributions to the understanding of traditional Chinese sexuality through his seminal works, Erotic Colour Prints of the Ming Period (1951) and Sexual Life in Ancient China; A Preliminary Survey of Chinese Sex and Society from ca. 1500 B.C. till 1644 A.D.. In these works, van Gulik delved into the complex and often misunderstood aspects of ancient Chinese sexual customs, and was the first scholar to call Daoist sexual practices "sexual vampirism"

Theoretical complications underlying his scholarship have been criticized by scholars such as Charlotte Furth: "Van Gulik's message to his mid-twentieth-century English-speaking reader was that traditional Chinese sexual norms were healthy, neither 'repressed' nor 'perverted'. Van Gulik's criteria here are those of Freudian discourse: what is repressive is abstinence, while perversions divert libido away from its proper genital outlets or channel it into sadomasochistic cruelties."

Van Gulik's interest in this field began during his posting to the Netherlands Embassy in Tokyo in 1949, when he obtained a set of Chinese original printing woodblocks for a rare Ming dynasty erotic picture album. His initial plan was to publish them in a limited edition, and add a brief preface on the "historical background of Chinese erotic art." However, upon beginning to research ancient Chinese sexual life and customs, he found that there was a paucity of serious literature available, either in Chinese sources (owing to "excessive prudery" during the Qing dynasty) or in Western sinological publications. The materials van Gulik assembled and examined convinced him that "the current foreign conception of the depraved and abnormal sexual habits of the ancient Chinese was completely wrong." In 1951, he privately published Erotic Colour Prints in a limited edition, distributing copies to academic institutions worldwide to ensure the content remained accessible only to qualified readers. Due to his concerns about limiting readership, van Gulik's English translations of sexually explicit Chinese passages were rendered in Latin; an attitude that Goldin says "smacks of elitism and is clearly outmoded today".

The pioneering scholar's 1951 Erotic Colour Prints referred to "sexual vampirism" in two contexts. The first described the metaphorical "battle" of the sexes:

These alchemists considered woman as the "enemy" because through her causing the man to emit semen, she robs him of his precious Yang essence. This conception resulted in woman being degraded to a mere source of supply of the coveted Yin essence. The Art of the Bedchamber as the alchemists interpreted it was a kind of cruel sexual vampirism. They believed not only that absorbing large quantities of Yin essence from the women they copulated with could lengthen their years and rejuvenate them, but also that the Elixir of Immortality resided in the "Original Femininity" [yuanpin] 元牝. This mysterious substance they described as concentrated, inactivated Yin essence, that could be extracted from the vaginal secretions especially of a young virgin. This substance could be tapped by performing the sexual act in a special way, or also be extracted from the woman by artificial means. Accordingly the alchemists engaged in various revolting and cruel experiments which not seldom caused the death of the unfortunate victim. … The sexual vampirism of the Taoist alchemists must be considered as quite apart from the Art of the Bedchamber, which, contrary to the allegations of later Confucianist writers, is by no means peculiar to Taoism.

The second context elaborates upon the first,

… Taoist alchemical treatise where the sexual act is considered exclusively as a means for attaining immortality. Above I referred to these depraved practices as "sexual vampirism." The Taoist teachings relating to this subject, however, bear a vicious character. They have nothing to do with love, not even with the satisfying of carnal desire or with sexual pleasure. These teachings preach a kind of sexual black magic, aimed at acquiring supernatural power at the expense of the sexual partner.

Although van Gulik popularized "sexual vampire" referring to Chinese sexual acts, he but did not coin the term. For instance, Arthur Eustace Morgan wrote, "Her heart has yearned for maternal love; but suddenly the idealized picture has dissolved and clearly and unmistakably there stands out the figure of a sexual vampire, Mrs. Warren—procuress."

Van Gulik's portrayal of Daoist sexual practices was not without controversy. In 1954, Joseph Needham, the eminent historian of science and technology in China, and his international group of collaborators began publishing the monumental series "Science and Civilisation in China". When Needham independently started researching ancient Daoist sexual alchemy, he read van Gulik's 1951 book and disagreed with some of its remarks, especially concerning "sexual vampirism". The two scholars subsequently corresponded, as described in the second volume of Science and Civilisation in China, which praises van Gulik's Erotic Colour Prints as an "excellent book". Needham notes that, "The only difference in our conclusions is that I think van Gulik's estimate of the Taoist theories and practices in his book (e.g. pp. 11, 69) was in general too unfavourable; aberrations were few and exceptional. Dr. van Gulik and I are now in agreement on the subject (personal communication)."

Van Gulik's preface to 1961 Sexual Life provides more information about their correspondence.

[Needham] consulted the copy of my book which I had presented to the library of his university, and found himself in disagreement with my unfavourable remarks on certain Taoist sexual disciplines. I must confess that those Taoist practices had rather shocked me at first and as a reaction I had characterized them as "sexual vampirism." Although when studying these matters as a layman it is difficult to maintain always the proper detached attitude of mind, I went much too far in stating that Taoist thought had exercised a detrimental influence on the treatment and position of women in ancient China. Needham pointed out to me in private correspondence that on the contrary Taoism had on the whole enhanced the position of Chinese women in general. Needham showed me that my interpretation of Taoist data had been too narrow, and that his broader views were indeed right.

Needham was already a world-famous scholar, while van Gulik was a diplomat who collected art and wrote books, for example, the Judge Dee historical mysteries. By accepting Needham's "broader views", Van Gulik augmented his belief that Chinese sexual practices were not "depraved." Goldin says, "But with hindsight, we can see today that Van Gulik's earlier thoughts on the matter were more judicious, and it is a pity that he allowed himself to be hectored."

1725 Chinese encyclopedia Gujin Tushu Jicheng illustration of a Nine-Tailed Fox Spirit

Despite van Gulik's agreement with Needham's opinion, his 1961 Sexual Life still refers to sex vampires in two circumstances. The former uses "sexual vampirism" to describe two erotic Ming dynasty novels. In the Zhulin yeshi (竹林野史; "Unofficial History of the Bamboo Garden"), "the teachings of the old handbooks of sex are Debased to a kind of sexual vampirism", and the Zhaoyang chushi (朝陽初時; "Birth of the Morning Sun") blends plot elements of "sexual vampirism, a perversion of the old Taoist disciplines" and fox-lore. The latter mentions sex vampires along with mythological fox spirits, hulijing (狐狸精; "fox spirit") or jiuweihu (九尾狐; "nine-tailed fox"), was believed capable of shapeshifting into a beautiful young woman to seduce men and absorb their jing ("semen; life-essence"). If a nocturnal emission is "induced by the man seeing a woman in his dreams, he must be on his guard against that woman if he actually meets her, for she may be a vampire or a fox-spirit." Voluntary celibacy for men and women was viewed with contempt and sharply denounced, particularly celibate women who "were suspected of being vampires or harbouring nefarious designs, and they were often persecuted …". Robert van Gulik's pioneering studies opened a window into the complex sexual culture of ancient China, challenging stereotypes and offering a nuanced perspective that continues to influence modern sinology.

== See also ==
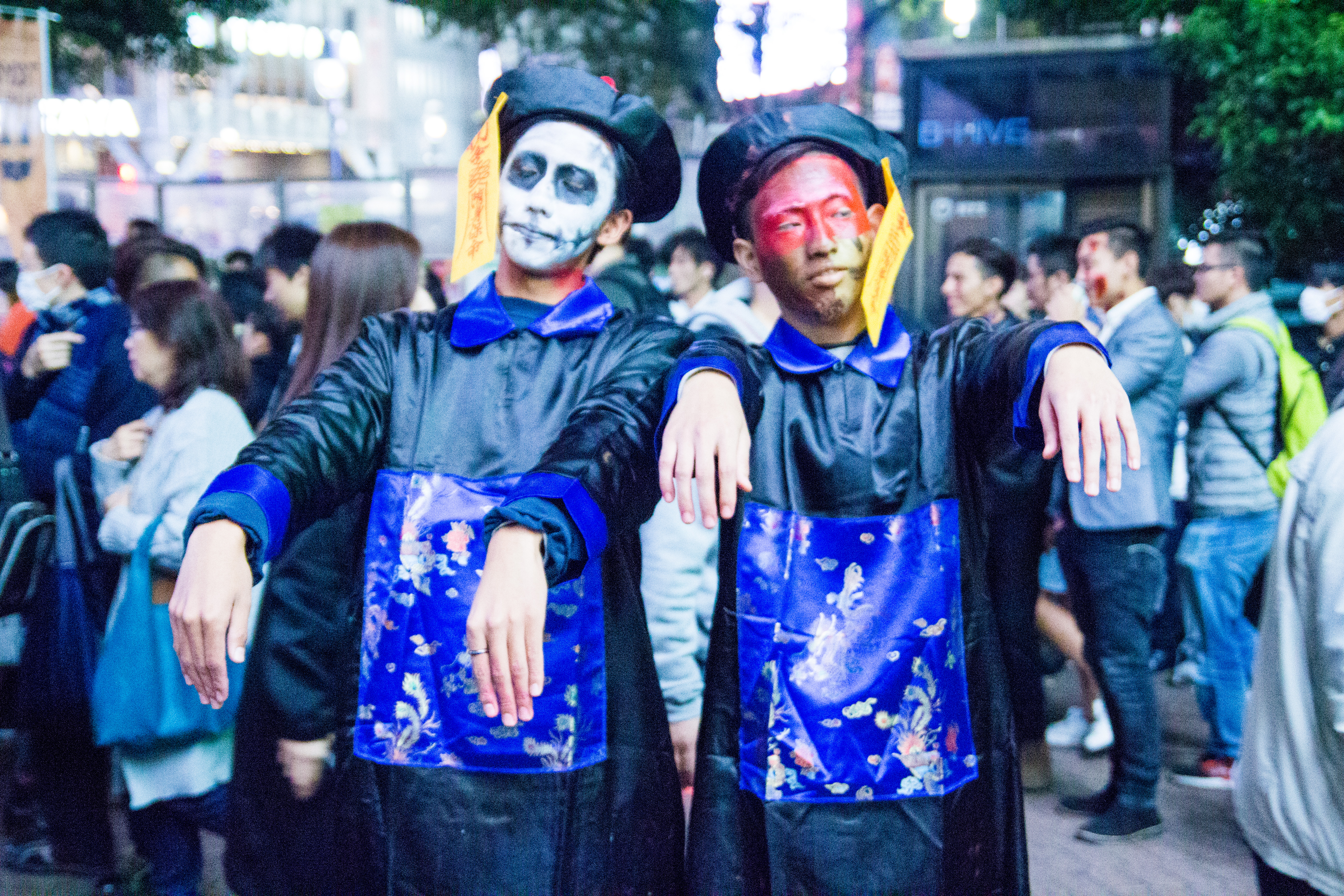
Typical jiangshi costumes

- Jiangshi, Chinese "hopping" vampire
- Jiutian Xuannü, Chinese goddess of sexuality and longevity
- List of vampires
- Vampire folklore by region
- Vampire literature
