= Zhang Jingsheng =

Chinese sexologist (1888–1970)

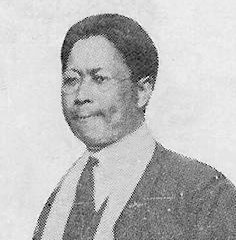
- Zhang, c. 1920s
- Born: Zhang Jiangliu; 20 February 1888; Darongpu, Raoping, Guangdong, Qing China
- Died: 18 June 1970 (aged 82); Raoping, Guangdong, China
- Spouse: Huang Guannan (m. 1935)

Education
- Education: Imperial University of Peking; University of Paris; University of Lyon
- Thesis: Les sources antiques des théories de J.-J. Rousseau sur l'éducation (1919)
- Doctoral advisor: Charles Chabot

Philosophical work
- Region: Chinese
- School: Social Darwinism
- Main interests: Aesthetics; sexology; eugenics
- Notable works: Sex Histories

Chinese name
- Traditional Chinese: 張競生
- Simplified Chinese: 张竞生
Transcriptions
Standard Mandarin
- Hanyu Pinyin: Zhāng Jìngshēng
- Gwoyeu Romatzyh: Jang Jinqsheng
- Wade–Giles: Chang^{1} Ching^{4}-sheng^{1}
- IPA: [ʈʂáŋ.tɕǐŋ.ʂə́ŋ]

Birth name
- Traditional Chinese: 張江流
- Simplified Chinese: 张江流
Transcriptions
Standard Mandarin
- Hanyu Pinyin: Zhāng Jiāngliú
- Gwoyeu Romatzyh: Jang Jiangliou
- Wade–Giles: Chang^{1} Jiang^{1}-liu^{2}

Courtesy name
- Chinese: 公室
Transcriptions
Standard Mandarin
- Hanyu Pinyin: Gōngshì
- Gwoyeu Romatzyh: Gongshyh
- Wade–Giles: Kung^{1}-shi^{4}

Nickname
- Chinese: 性博士
Transcriptions
Standard Mandarin
- Hanyu Pinyin: Xìng Bóshì
- Gwoyeu Romatzyh: Shinq Borshyh
- Wade–Giles: Hsing^{4} Po^{1}-shih^{4}

Zhang Jingsheng (born Zhang Jiangliu; 20 February 1888 – 18 June 1970) was a Chinese philosopher and sexologist. Born to a merchant family in Raoping County in eastern Guangzhou, Zhang attended Whampoa Military Primary School, where he became a militant supporter of Tongmenghui revolutionaries. After he was expelled from Whampoa, he met with Tongmenghui leader Sun Yat-sen and entered the Imperial University of Peking. He became an enthusiastic advocate of European ideas of social Darwinism, scientific racism, and eugenics, changing his personal name to Jingsheng, "competition for survival". He was an active member of the Beijing Tongmenghui cell alongside Wang Jingwei, but declined a political post in the aftermath of the 1911 Revolution, instead studying in France.

Zhang received a doctorate from the University of Lyon in 1919 for a thesis on Jean-Jacques Rousseau, one of his major philosophical inspirations. On recommendation from Cai Yuanpei, he became a professor at Peking University soon after his return to China in 1920. During the early 1920s, he wrote two books advocating for a society organized around aesthetic principles. In 1926, he published Sex Histories, a sexology text based on stories of sexual encounters he gathered from the public. He was ridiculed by much of the Chinese media and academia for the book, and was often referred to by the mocking nickname Dr. Sex (性博士; Xìng Bóshì) in the tabloid press. A number of unauthorized pornographic sequels of the book were published due to its popularity, leading to confusion about which books were Zhang's original work. He left teaching and settled in Shanghai shortly after the release of Sex Histories. He founded a "Beauty Bookshop" in Shanghai, which published sex-education texts and translations of European literature and philosophy, and edited a monthly periodical he named New Culture. In 1929, he returned to France to work as a translator after his business efforts in Shanghai failed. Four years later, he returned to his home county of Raoping and worked in local politics and education in relative obscurity. He was persecuted by the Red Guards during the Cultural Revolution and died while in confinement in 1970.

Loosely inspired by Havelock Ellis, Zhang's sexual thought centers on the absorption of bodily fluids produced during sex, which he saw as important for sexual pleasure and the vitality of the resulting children. His political writings outlined a utopian "New China" which would govern society according to aesthetics and sentimentality. This "aesthetic state" would institute a national eugenics program to resolve what he perceived as the weaknesses of the Chinese race. Although he enjoyed a brief period of academic prestige for his works in the early 1920s, the scandal around Sex Histories destroyed his professional reputation, and he became disconnected from academia. Posthumous scholarly opinions on him and his work range from dismissive to highly supportive. His son Zhang Chao, a local official in Raoping, collected his works and worked to promote his legacy during the 1980s. His former home was rebuilt by the county government in 2004 and converted into a park named Dr. Zhang Jingsheng Park. Collections of his writing began to be published during the 1980s, but Sex Histories was not fully republished until 2005, likely due to obscenity laws.

== Early life and education ==
On 20 February 1888, Zhang Jiangliu (张江流) was born in Darongpu Village, Fubin Town, in Raoping County, a rural county in eastern Guangzhou. He was the third child of a well-to-do merchant family. Before settling in rural Guangzhou, his father Zhang Zhihe and grandfather Zhang Xiangruo were affluent Overseas Chinese merchants active in Malaya, Vietnam, and Singapore. Zhang's father took a concubine when Zhang was young, causing great division and strife in his family. During the Qing period, having concubines was a common means to demonstrate one's wealth.

Zhang first attended a traditional private elementary school in a nearby village, where his teacher gave him the name Gongshi (公室; 'state bureaucracy'), derived from the work of ancient philosopher Li Si. In 1903, he attended the western-style No. 1 Primary School in Raoping, and moved to nearby Shantou in 1904 to study at Tongwen High School.

In 1907, Zhang tested into the Whampoa Military Primary School (the precursor to the Whampoa Military Academy), a provincial military academy that had been recently established as part of the Qing dynasty's military modernization program. Whampoa required the study of a foreign language, and Zhang's year cohort was randomly assigned French. He became a supporter of the Tongmenghui revolutionary organization through its Min Bao (民報; 'Civic News') newspaper, which took a socialist, anti-statist position, inspired by a variety of European philosophers. Among the journal's major ideological inspirations was Jean-Jacques Rousseau, a French Enlightenment-era philosopher heavily championed in columns by Wang Jingwei due to his emphasis of the social contract and natural rights. The deputy director of Whampoa, Tongmenghui member Zhao Sheng, connected Zhang with his revolutionary contacts.

=== College education ===
Zhang was rejected for a government scholarship to studies overseas, and became increasingly rebellious against the academy. He cut off his queue (a hairstyle mandated by the Qing government) and advocated that other classmates do the same. Incensed by the school's food service, which he claimed penalized slower eaters, he staged a protest with a classmate. After they were both suspended for one year, they took Zhao's advice and traveled to Singapore to meet with Tongmenghui leader Sun Yat-sen. Sun and revolutionary Hu Hanmin advised Zhang to return to China, attend a military college, and infiltrate the Qing New Army.

Zhang returned in 1910, seeking to continue his academic study. His father only allowed him to do this after Zhang accepted an arranged marriage with an illiterate fifteen-year-old girl named Xu Chunjiang. He wrote in his memoirs later in life that it was a major contributor to his support of freedom of marriage and sex education. Resenting the union, he ran away from his family six months later. He began studying at the French Jesuit Aurora University in Shanghai, later transferring to a French teacher's school in Beijing and then the Imperial University of Peking.

During his studies, Zhang was introduced to the theory of social Darwinism, of which he would become a strong proponent. Inspired by this, he changed his personal name to Jingsheng (競生; 'competition for survival'). (Note: The Chinese academic Hu Shih's memoirs report various young intellectuals adopting Darwinist names during this period.) He had his first exposure to sexology around this time via Carl Heinrich Stratz's Die Rassenschönheit des Weibes ('The Racial Beauty of Women'), featuring hundreds of nude and erotic photographs of young girls and women from various countries alongside anthropological commentary advocating that Germanic women had "ideal proportions". Introduced to theories of scientific racism, Zhang became convinced that the Chinese race suffered from pathological androgyny—what Stratz described as "feminized men" and "masculinized women"—which could only be resolved through eugenics.

=== Revolutionary activity and overseas study ===
Zhang became active in the Tianjin–Beijing cell of the Tongmenghui, where he became close to Wang Jingwei and his fiancée Chen Bijun, alongside other prominent revolutionaries such as Wu Zhihui and Zhang Ji. After Wang was arrested in a failed plot to assassinate the Qing prince regent Zaifeng, Zhang raised money for a planned jailbreak. Zhang graduated in 1911, shortly before the outbreak of the Xinhai Revolution, where the Tongmenghui overthrew the Qing dynasty and established the Republic of China. The following year, he was appointed by Sun Yat-sen to serve under Wang as an official in the North–South Conference, a peace conference in Shanghai with the leading Beiyang Army general Yuan Shikai. Zhang wrote in his memoirs that none of the figures involved in peace negotiations "understood what kind of creature republicanism was", blaming this for the ensuing Yuan Shikai regime and the fall into warlordism over the following years.

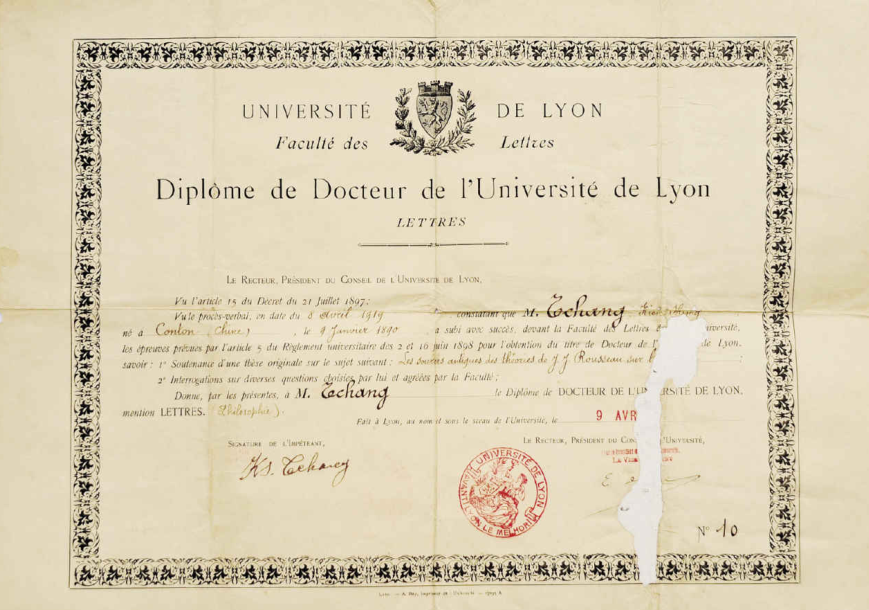
Zhang's doctoral degree from the University of Lyon, 1919

Zhang declined a posting in the incipient republican government, instead opting to participate as one of the first twenty-five students sponsored by the Kuomintang (the successor party to the Tongmenghui) to travel overseas to continue their education. His participation in the study program was likely due to advocacy from fellow revolutionary Cai Yuanpei.

Zhang initially enrolled in the University of Paris. He made overtures to study medicine and foreign relations, but eventually specialized in social philosophy. The university's Faculty of Letters awarded him a diploma in philosophy in 1914. Due to the outbreak of World War I and the threat posed by the German Army to Paris, he moved to the south of France to continue philosophy studies at the University of Lyon. He further studied the work of Rousseau and sociologist Émile Durkheim. Captivated by Rousseau, Zhang wrote his doctoral thesis on Rousseau's pedagogy, with educator Charles Chabot as his doctoral advisor. Zhang received his doctorate in April 1919. Out of the twenty-five members of his cohort of foreign students, only Zhang and Tan Xihong received doctoral degrees. Zhang chaired a Chinese student group while in France and participated in the founding of the Sino-French Education Association, which promoted overseas education and work-study programs to Chinese academics, most notably through the Diligent Work–Frugal Study Movement. He organized support for Chinese laborers recruited to work in France during the war.

== Academic career ==
In 1920, Zhang returned to China and became the headmaster of Jinshan Middle School in Guangdong on the recommendation of Chaozhou politician Zou Lu. To the reported irritation of the school's owners, he replaced many of the teachers and initiated several reforms, such as the introduction of coeducation, physical education classes, and English-language instruction alongside the abandonment of rote learning. He met with the Guangdong warlord (a regional military governor) Chen Jiongming to advocate for the regional introduction of birth control, which was rejected. Zhang claimed that Chen called him "mentally deranged" when he made the proposal. He was forced to resign after a year and left Guangdong, fearing political persecution by Chen. Cai Yuanpei, the chancellor of Peking University, offered Zhang a position as a professor of philosophy, which he accepted.

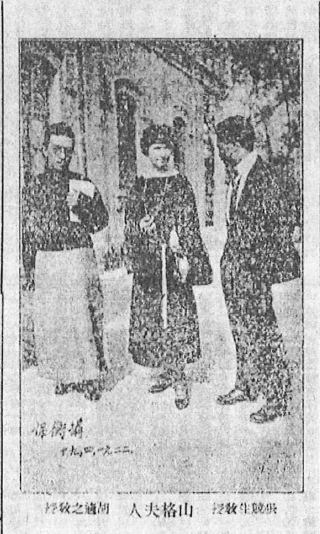
From left to right, Hu Shih, Margaret Sanger, and Zhang

At Peking, Zhang was strongly influenced by the political and social philosophies of the May Fourth Movement, sharing the belief that China's weakness against the foreign powers had to be overcome through mass political action and education. He was a popular professor at the university, teaching classes on aesthetics, logic, French, the history of European philosophy, and "customs investigation" (風俗調查; Fēngsú diàochá), which combined anthropology, ethnology, sociology, and folkloristics. He wrote articles for May Fourth Movement publications such as the Jingbao fukan (京报附刊; 'Beijing Post Literary Supplement') and Chenbao fukan (晨报副刊; 'Morning Post Literary Supplement'). In 1923, he married a graduate student at Peking named Chu Songxue, but divorced her a few years later after a tumultuous marriage.

Zhang became close to several other faculty members at Peking, including his old Tongmenghui comrades Wu Zhihui and Zhang Ji, as well as librarian and activist Li Dazhao. Zhang and the writer Hu Shih served as translators for birth control activist Margaret Sanger during her visit to Beijing in 1922. Soon after, Zhang attempted to organize a visit from Albert Einstein, who chose instead to spend time in Japan.

=== First books ===
In 1924, Zhang published his first book, Mei de renshengguan (美的人生觀; 'A Beautiful Philosophy on Life'), based on his class lectures. The book was very well received, and was reprinted in five editions within two years. In the book, Zhang responds to the academic debate over the value of science and intellectual westernization to China. Some Chinese intellectuals viewed the devastating effects of World War I as evidence of the moral bankruptcy of European civilization caused by a preoccupation with rationality and science as opposed to spiritual matters. Zhang advocates for a form of westernization which combines rationalism with the reorganization of society around aesthetic principles. He followed it up the following year with Mei de shehui zuzhifa (美的社會組織法; 'The Way to Organize a Beautiful Society'), expanding on his vision for a "New China" and "New People" in a society oriented around beauty. The book included a call for "sentimental people from everywhere" to "unite into a front and overthrow the government and people that have no feelings".

Zhang biographer Leon Antonio Rocha described the books as a bricolage of a political manifesto, manual for life, and science fiction, mixed with various personal anecdotes from his time in Europe and attacks of his intellectual opponents. Both books were initially serialized through the Chenbao fukan and later published through the Shanghai Beixin Press. They appealed to aesthetic philosophy to advocate for the westernization of China, strongly condemning Confucianism and stating that the talented and erotically liberated inhabitants of "New China" could develop a form of "aesthetic labor" indistinguishable from play. They also espoused a form of positive eugenics, recommending interracial marriage with Europeans and the Japanese in order to overcome the "weaknesses" of the Chinese race. Interested in fostering additional research in the field, he founded an "Aesthetics Study Society" at Peking in 1924. His aesthetic works were well received by contemporary academics. The writer Zhou Zuoren, who had critiqued The Way to Organize a Beautiful Society for Zhang prior to its publication, praised his boldness in advocating for beauty in opposition to traditional Taoist and Confucian morals.

== Sex Histories ==
Following systemic collection of folk songs by Gu Jiegang, Zhou Zuoren, and Liu Bannong in the late 1910s, a periodical entitled Geyao zhoukan (歌謠週刊; 'Folksongs Weekly') was created and attracted the attention of social academics at Peking University, including Zhang. Work around the journal resulted in the creation of the Customs Survey Society (風俗調查會; Fēngsú diàocháhuì) in May 1923, with Zhang serving as its first director. He outlined sample survey questionnaires and field research methods, seeking to compile information from different Chinese ethnic groups on around forty topics ranging from food to crime and personal hygiene. Zhang recommended that the Survey Society collect information on sexuality and sexual customs, but this was vetoed by the rest of the committee, who felt that these topics were too controversial to study. Zhang resolved to continue studying sexuality without the society's sponsorship.

Modern sexology had only recently introduced to China, with the first sexological works—mainly translated from Japanese—appearing during the first decade of the 1900s. During the mid- to late 1910s and 1920s, popular discussions of sexuality became more common in the wake of the New Culture and May Fourth reform movements. Inspired by the work of British sexologist Havelock Ellis, Zhang became interested in collecting sexual case studies for sociological analysis.

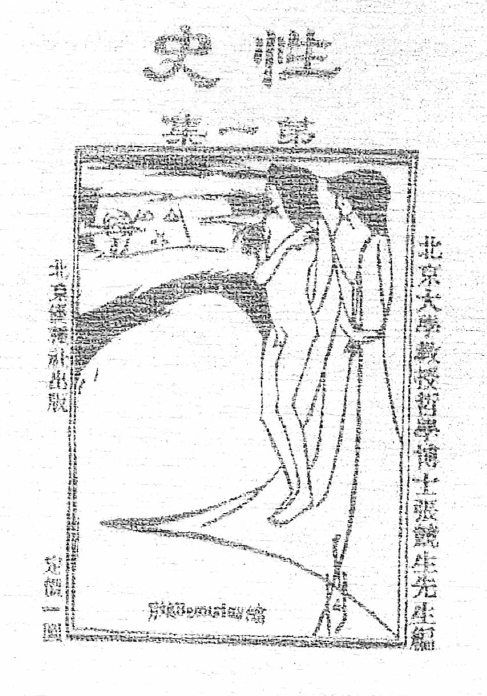
The cover of Sex Histories Part I, featuring an edited version of Aubrey Beardsley's 1894 The Woman in the Moon

In February 1926, Zhang published an announcement in the Jingbao fukan entitled "The Best Pastime for the Winter Vacation: An Announcement Made on Behalf of the Eugenics Society", calling for readers to submit detailed accounts of their sex lives. Prompts included with the advertisement asked readers to recount a variety of experiences, including their earliest exposure to sexuality, their methods of masturbation, their preferred sexual positions, whether they had had homosexual experiences, and whether they had engaged in bestiality. Zhang called on readers to describe each sexual relationship in detail, writing that it would benefit scholarly understanding of sex and academic scholarship in general. This was the first time a public call to share sexual experiences had been published in China.

Come on! Come on! Give us your detailed and truthful sex histories, and we will try to give you ultimate sexual happiness. You supply us with the materials, and we shall provide you with the correct methods. This is truly to give you ultimate sexual happiness.

— Zheng Jingsheng, excerpt from Jingbao Fukan announcement

The announcement received a large amount of public attention: Zhang claimed to have received over 200 responses. He chose seven of these to feature in his book, of which the identities of two respondents are known: Zhang's second wife, Chu Songxue, and novelist Jin Mancheng. Zhang's Sex Histories Part I (性史第一輯; Xìngshǐ dìyījí) was released in 1926, (Note: Rocha states that Zhang's call for stories was made in February 1926 and the book was released that May, while Peng suggests that the book was published in February 1926.) published by the Beijing Eugenics Society. It was an inexpensive publication, especially when compared to the academic sexological works used in legal and medical contexts. About a hundred pages in length, Rocha noted that it was small enough to read with one hand. The title Xingshi holds both academic and pornographic subtext, as the character 史 (shǐ) was used to describe both kinds of publication.

In Sex Histories, Zhang explains his sexual theory through annotations of the reader-submitted case studies. He claims that sexual perversions, pornography, and prostitution are the result of the silencing and repression of sexuality and advocates for a sexual revolution towards openness and "healthy sex". Such a revolution is framed as an unavoidable prerequisite for the moral and political advancement of the Chinese nation towards equal footing with the western world. Zhang states that sexual openness, especially through the sharing and documentation of sexual experiences, is required to achieve this cultural change. Among his focuses in the book is the absorption of sexual fluids between partners during sex for their health benefits. The most important of these is the "third kind of water" (第三種水; Dìsānzhǒng shuǐ), purportedly produced during simultaneous orgasm and able to strengthen conceived children.

=== Reception and notoriety ===
Sex Histories quickly became a widespread commercial success, as well as one of the most controversial books of Republican China. The book had a relatively limited initial print run of around 1,000 copies, but this quickly swelled. A 1936 estimate put the total circulation in Shanghai alone at around 50,000 copies, including unlicensed editions printed by others. The book had an exceptionally high circulation in comparison to texts by May Fourth Movement intellectuals, which typically saw only a few thousand copies. Upon its release, a large group assembled at the Guanghua Bookstore in Shanghai awaiting the book, prompting onlookers to head to the store to investigate; the ensuing crowd blocked the avenue in front, leading the Shanghai Municipal Police to disperse the crowd with water cannons.

An August 1926 article in the Guangzhou Minguo ribao (廣州民國日報; 'Guangzhou Republic Daily') reported that 5,000 copies of the book had been sold in Guangzhou. Noting its popularity among adolescent girls, it described the rampant popularity of the volume as an "epidemic", mirroring various other contemporary descriptions of the book's spread. One retrospective account by academic Shen Yingming noted that the book's popularity among college students was boosted by institutions attempting to ban it. Zhang was aware that young people were reading the book for its arousing content, but considered this acceptable due to the work's focus on sex education, writing "we are not concerned about young people's sexual urges; we only worry that they may act recklessly on such sexual urges or overindulge in such urges."

The Sexual Histories, Part II available on the market now, falsely using my name, is crass in content, and is sold at an exorbitantly high price. After legal action, the whole issue has been settled by a mediator. The two parties involved have decided to solve the problem in peace. Besides agreeing to compensate me for damaging my reputation and to destroy the copies in stock, the other party has agreed to print this announcement in the journal (in my name, paid for by him) and the following table of contents of the said volume, so that buyers will not be defrauded of the truth.

— Zhang Jingsheng, New Culture, 1 January 1927

As the epithet Part I signals, Zhang intended to publish sequels to the book. However, numerous sequels and parodies of Sexual Histories were produced by authors seeking to profit off of its success and notoriety. These often included literary sexual tropes and explicit erotica. The first of these unlicensed pornographic sequels, Sex Histories Part II, was published by the end of the year. Zhang published a response to the sequel in January 1927, describing it as fraudulent and noting that he had settled out of court with the illicit publisher.

Some unlicensed sequels featured excerpts from classic erotic novels such as Jin Ping Mei and Dengcao Heshang (燈草和尚傳; 'The Legend of the Candlestick Monk'). One particularly successful parody by comic playwright Xu Zhuodai, entitled The Art of Sex (性藝; Xìngyì), featured Zhang being visited and pleasured by various women with different sexual skills, ending with his death after his penis is bitten off by a visitor's puppy. Many readers thought that The Art of Sex was written by Zhang himself, leading to confusion over which work was the parody and which was Zhang's original work.

Several regional and local governments, including those of Shanghai and Guangzhou, instituted bans of the book and its parodies, raiding bookstores to prevent distribution. These, like other contemporary censorship efforts, were ineffective at slowing the circulation of the book. Tabloids began to frequently target Zhang; the Shanghai tabloid Jingbao lambasted Zhang and the traditionalist sexologist Ye Dehui in nearly every issue from August 1926 to December 1928. He was given various epithets and nicknames by tabloid press, including "Dr. Sex" (性博士; Xìng bóshì) and "Dr. Bullshit" (胡說博士; Húshuō bóshì).

Academic opinion turned sharply against Zhang, with scholars dismissing his theories as either nonsensical or pornographic. Sex Histories was criticized by some of his former colleagues, including Hu Shih and Zhou Zuoren. In a Chenbao fukan column, Zhou wrote that Zhang's advocacy of spiritual interpretations of sexual technique in the book was unscientific. Zhang responded that he had combined science and philosophy into an "artistic method". Fellow eugenicist Pan Guangdan rejected Zhang's concept of a "third kind of water", comparing it to Daoist sexual practices. Despite this backlash, some academics supported the book. Novelist Lin Yutang wrote that it was instrumental in changing the "physical and mental outlook of Chinese girls".

Zhang decided against his initial plan to publish additional volumes of Sex Histories. Conditions for professors at Peking University had worsened by late 1926. The chaotic political climate, characterized by violent events such as the March 18 Massacre, had made Beijing dangerous to academics. Due to mismanaged and possibly embezzled university funding, Peking University faculty only received around 30%–40% of their paychecks by 1926. Zhang wrote that he never returned to the university after taking a sabbatical, moving to the emerging cultural capital, Shanghai.

== Shanghai and the Beauty Bookshop ==
Zhang initially considered an attempt to secure a position at the Commercial Press, one of the three major publishing firms in Shanghai, (Note: Alongside the Zhonghua Book Company and the World Books Company. Commercial Press was referred to as "Three Legs of the Tripod", the dominant companies within the Chinese publishing industry.) but decided against it due to the company's conservative stance. In May 1927, he opened the "Beauty Bookshop" (美的書店; Měi de Shūdiàn) on Fuzhou Road, a center of entertainment and cultural business within the International Settlement. To circumvent potential arrest or persecution, Zhang's residence was located within the French Concession, where the International Settlement's Shanghai Municipal Police had no jurisdiction. Likely to avoid legal liability, Zhang was not officially the owner of the bookstore. The largest shareholder and general manager was a man named Xie Yunru, while Zhang was the company's chief editor. The photographer and translator Peng Zhaoliang was hired as deputy editor.

Zhang's bookshop produced three book series. The "Little Series on Sex Education" (性慾小叢書; Xìngyù xiǎo cóngshū) were translated selections, about 10,000–20,000 characters long, taken from Havelock Ellis (then the most popular foreign sexologist in China) and particularly his Studies in the Psychology of Sex series. Each featured a nude painting on the front cover. The "General Literature" series featured Zhang's previous works (A Beautiful Philosophy on Life and The Way to Organize a Beautiful Society), as well as various other translations, while a "Romantic Literature" series consisted of Chinese translations of foreign authors, especially French authors such as Rousseau, Alexandre Dumas, and Victor Hugo. Zhang did not offer any textbooks for sale, the most profitable book genre for the major publishers of the period.

In 1927, Zhang published the book Xingshu yu yinshu (性書與淫書; 'Sex Books and Obscene Books'), advocating for the differentiation of 'sex books' (性書; xìngshū), focused on romance while occasionally featuring sexually explicit scenes, from obscene books, which he defined as featuring sexual intercourse without love. He described Dream of the Red Chamber (an 18th century classic novel) as an example of xingshu due to its focus on the qing (sentiment) of protagonist Jia Baoyu; in contrast, he saw Jin Ping Mei as an obscene book due to its protagonists' obsession with sex for pure pleasure. Zhang argued that the Chinese people needed xingshu in order to be motivated to have sex for qing as opposed to physical pleasure.

=== New Culture ===
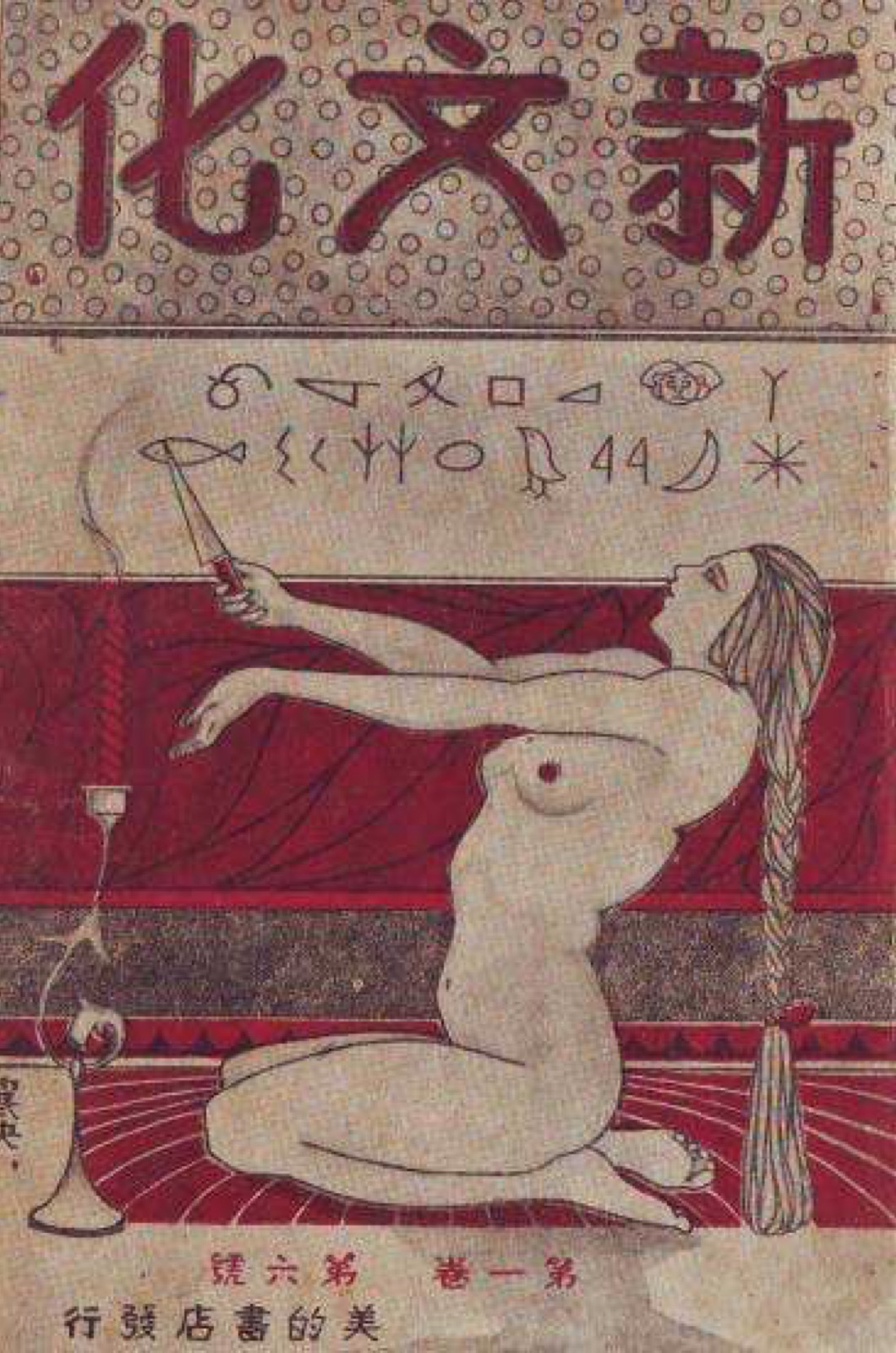
Cover of New Culture issue 6, 1927

Zhang and around five or six of his ideological disciples organized the "New Culture Society" (新文化社; Xīn wénhuà shè) in Shanghai, centered around sex education and his aesthetic ideology. He attempted to expand the society into branches outside Shanghai, boosting the visibility of his bookstore, but these efforts were unsuccessful. Soon after his arrival in December 1926, this society began a periodical named New Culture (新文化; Xīn wénhuà), which billed itself as "China's Paramount New Thought Monthly Journal". Outlining the purpose of the journal, he wrote that he sought the renewal of the Chinese people in all aspects of life, "from the most basic to the most complex: from shitting, to sex, and on to thinking and culture".

New Culture had a monthly circulation of around 20,000 copies, not including unlicensed editions. Its first issue was headlined with an article on women's inheritance rights, with endorsements from various influential politicians and intellectuals, including Cai Yuanpei, Wu Zhihui, and Zhang Ji. Zhang ran an advice column titled "Sex Education Communications" (性慾通訊; Xìngyù tōngxùn) in every issue of the paper besides the fifth, where it was noted the section had been removed by government censorship. The following issue, Zhang announced that he had received so many letters from fans of the column that he decided to restart the column despite the opposition of the Municipal Police. He mainly received letters from men, although a minority were from women. Zhang advised readers on topics such as birth control, circumcision, sex toys and premature ejaculation, incorporating both humor and sympathy into his responses. He featured some of the excerpts he had translated from Studies in the Psychology of Sex in the paper.

The periodical ran intermittently for six issues before folding partway through 1927. Two years later, the Beauty Bookshop itself went out of business. Zhang attributed this to harassment from "Jiangsu gangsters" and the police, writing that they had been prosecuted seven or eight times by the Municipal Police. According to Zhang, the police attempted to negotiate with him to remove the nude paintings and pay them a large bribe. He claimed that when he refused, the Shanghai Post Office stopped delivering mail to his store, severely impacting his business. The Kuomintang's campaign of political repression beginning in 1927—the White Terror—shifted local government towards socially conservative attitudes and made it more hostile to Zhang's business. Unsustainable business practices—most notably the absence of textbooks—also likely played a major role in the shop's decline.

== Later life and death ==
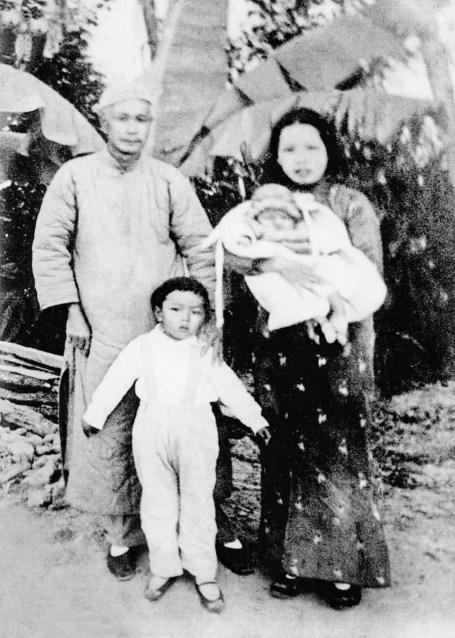
Zhang with Huang and their two children in early 1940s

After the closure of the Beauty Bookshop, Zhang continued his work on translating Rousseau and earned an income delivering lectures. He released an abridged Chinese translation of Rousseau's Confessions in 1928, with a full translation produced the following year. He was arrested for "corrupting and poisoning the youth" while visiting Hangzhou to relax at the West Lake. He claimed that his arrest was ordered by Jiang Menglin, a colleague at Peking University who now served as the educational minister of Zhejiang. Zhang's release from prison was secured by two of his old friends, the Kuomintang officers Zhang Ji and Zhang Renjie.

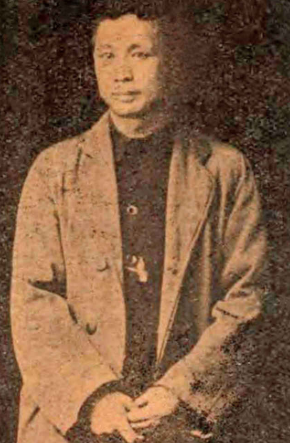
Zhang in 1930, as seen in Liangyou Magazine

Zhang briefly returned to Shanghai, but was unable to maintain a steady income. He signed a contract with the major Shanghai publishing company World Books, who sponsored him to relocate to Paris later in 1929 and translate books into Chinese. In a series dubbed Langman pai congshu (浪漫派叢書; 'The Romantics') published translations of Goethe's Dichtung und Wahrheit, George Sand's Indiana, and Lord Byron's Don Juan, as well as various volumes of romantic fiction for his publisher. He also became interested in the work of Sigmund Freud. He was the first to translate Freud's Interpretation of Dreams into Chinese, which was published serially in the magazine Dushu zazhi (讀書雜誌; 'Readers' Magazine'). Zhang published two of his own books during this period: Great and Sinister Art and Introduction to the Romantics.

Zhang returned to China in the summer of 1933. He married Huang Guannan in Guangzhou in August 1935. Increasingly disillusioned with Chinese national politics and culture, he returned to Raoping County after a brief stay in Shanghai and became active in local politics. He remained in relative obscurity; many believed that he had poisoned himself and died, while others thought that he had been murdered by the Communists. He founded a co-educational peasant school, and organized local agricultural projects and the construction of public roads. During the Second Sino-Japanese War, he was a leader in the local anti-Japanese resistance movement. Around 1941, he produced expository reports on rural poverty. After the founding of the People's Republic of China in 1949, he received Communist political education and returned to work as a teacher while secretly conducting philosophical research. He briefly worked as an archivist for the Guangdong provincial archives.

Zhang lived in a rural village during his later years and organized his home and diet according to his philosophy of aesthetics. He wrote three memoirs during the 1950s: Ten Years in the Battlefields of Love (十年場情; Shínián chǎngqíng, 1953), Reveries on a Floating Life (浮生漫談; Fúshēng màntán, 1956), and Whirlpools of Love (愛的漩渦; Ài de xuánwō, 1957), followed by two introductory philosophy texts around 1960. He also wrote a play focused on the former Chinese president Yuan Shikai. During the Cultural Revolution, beginning in 1966, Zhang was harassed by the Red Guards and sent to a reeducation facility. He was put into forced labor at a small village near his birthplace in eastern Guangdong. On 18 June 1970, he suffered a brain hemorrhage and died in confinement in Raoping.

== Views and philosophy ==
Zhang was an enthusiastic supporter of the Kuomintang during the 1920s. He wore a Western-style Kuomintang military uniform (which he called a "school uniform") daily, believing that it was a way to embrace the revolutionary spirit. In an article published in New Culture, he declared that he was not only a revolutionary, but a "supra-revolutionary" due to his emphasis on aesthetics and sexual education. In June 1922, he joined a group of over 200 Beijing intellectuals, including Li Shizeng and Cai Yuanpei, to oppose Sun Yat-sen's proposed military expedition to reunify the country. He opposed overt labor strike actions, believing that "total rebellion and senseless sacrifice" should be avoided in favor of workers self-organizing through peaceful means.

=== Utopian society ===
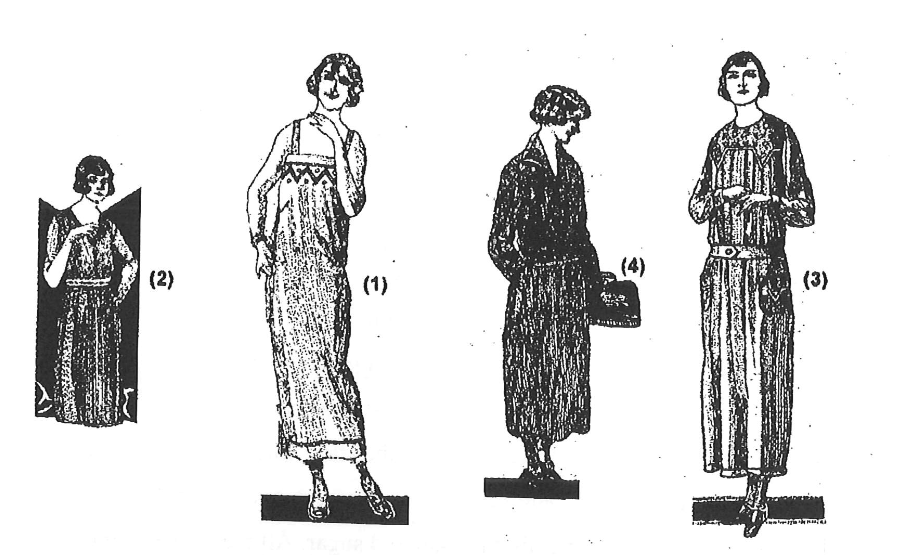
Western-style clothing proposed for the women of New China, from Zhang's Aesthetic Outlook on Life (1925)

Zhang conceptualized a utopian aesthetic state structured around beauty, with the ultimate goal to "facilitate the people's pursuits of their own interests and inclinations, to provide them with the necessary resources for living, and to guide them to ultimate happiness." Regarding the Marxist notion of class struggle as unimportant, he described the preeminent political conflict in the world as a struggle between "sentimental people" (有情者; Yǒuqíng zhě) and "heartless people" (無情者; Wúqíng zhě). He viewed beauty and vitality as key component of all life. According to Zhang, every living cell possesses some small amount of vitality, and that every individual has a "potential energy" comprising the total vitality of their cells and the energy produced by their surrounding environment. Surplus energy could be used for artistic creation, creating what Zhang dubbed "energy of presence", which spreads potential energy outward and enriches the human spirit.

Zhang described his ideal China as a "Fifth International" (第五国际; Dìwǔ guójì), (Note: Along the pattern of the socialist Internationals, worldwide federations of socialist and communist groups. At the time of Zhang's writing, there had only been three (the First International, Second International, and Third International); the Fourth International was founded by Leon Trotsky over a decade later.) proposing a central government including five "queens" and eight "kings" selected through a yearly national talent show and beauty pageant. Runner-ups in this contest would receive elite roles such as "concubine" and "minister". Constituting a new elite alongside the kings and queens, they would be encouraged to form families with one another and serve as role models for the nation. A thousand-member "Parliament of Love and Beauty" would be formed from the ranks of these elites (weighted to include more women than men) and elect a Great President as head of state. Money would be abolished and replaced with "beauty credit tickets" (美值票; Měi zhí piào) featuring famous paintings, which would be exchangeable for goods and services. The government of the new China would consist of eight ministries, dedicated respectively to national strength, engineering, education and the arts, leisure and entertainment, rectification of the rites, diplomacy, transport and tourism, and commerce.

The most powerful of the ministries would be the Ministry of National Strength, which would closely monitor all citizens and head a nationwide eugenics program through a "Department of Matchmaking". Although there would be no requirement to marry, keeping with the principle of free love, all couples who wish to have children would need permission from the department, which would analyze their life histories and determine whether the couple is a suitable match capable of raising children, and if so, how many children they should be permitted to have. All mothers would be required to raise their children according to state principles, instilled through a system of "mothers' institutes" (母親元; Mǔqīn yuán). The department would also find suitable partners for single people. The Ministry of National Strength would also organize childcare, manage public health and sanitation, and sterilize, detain, or kill who Zhang describes as 'undesirables'—criminals and the mentally ill. The Ministry of National Strength would control internal migration through a residency permit system and maintain a suitable population density across the nation; if an area becomes overpopulated, residents would be asked to either move elsewhere or take contraceptive medicine to prevent children. All citizens would be required to bathe daily in public nude bathhouses. Zhang recommended that women form "lovers' associations" to promote romance and contraception, as well as "beauty societies" to study self-beautification.

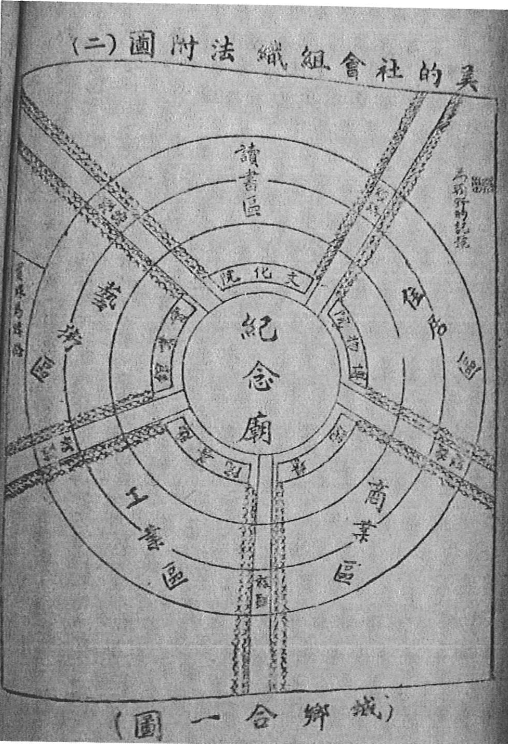
Zhang's model for "Beautiful Beijing", from his Way to Organize a Beautiful Society (1926)

Zhang placed great importance in urban planning and architecture. His envisioned Ministry of Engineering would connect all parts of China through a highway system and maintain infrastructure and public utilities. Cities would be redesigned to embody aesthetic values. He sought to transform the capital, Beijing (which he saw as chaotic and full of "ugly, weak, and weary" residents), into "Beautiful Beijing", a planned circular city with a radius of roughly 50 mi (80 km), modeled on urban planner Ebenezer Howard's concept of a garden city. The new Beijing would be divided into five sectors, zoned for arts, education, residences, commerce, and industry, each divided by large tree-lined boulevards flanked by expanses of fields and farmland. These would be arranged radially around a massive central plaza and a grand Memorial Temple (an enormous stone tower), which would lie on the site of a demolished Tienanmen Square and Forbidden City. The headquarters of major state institutions would be arranged around the temple.

Confucianism (alongside all religious systems) would be uprooted and replaced with what Zhang called a "Faith of Worship of Love and Beauty" (愛與美的信仰和崇拜; Ài yǔ měide xìnyǎng hé chóngbài). This new religion would celebrate the lives of past heroic ancestors through a continuously updated collection of poems, which would serve as the sole religious text and a core component of education. Burial would be abolished; the remains of deceased citizens would be stored either as ashes in the Memorial Temple, or as scattered remains in the catacombs below. The deceased would be placed in one of these locations based on the testimonials collected from their friends and family, alongside information collected from their own diaries.

==== Racial politics ====
Zhang saw the world as divided into a racial hierarchy with Caucasians at the top, the Chinese and Japanese in the middle, and Black and Brown people at the bottom. He was a strong supporter of interracial relationships between Chinese people and Europeans, seeing it as a way for the Chinese to overcome their supposedly sickly and androgynous bodies and strengthen the nation. The Japanese were also appropriate to have relationships with, as according to Zhang they were "extremely diligent and determined people". He wrote that such interracial relationships would create harmony between nations and eventually lead to world peace. However, Zhang was opposed to interracial relationships between Chinese people and those from India, Southeast Asia, Africa, and the Middle East. He considered it somewhat appropriate for desperate or courageous men to marry Black or Brown women to help bring them into civilization, but completely forbade Chinese women from marrying Black or Brown men. Rocha describes Zhang's outlook as a racial inferiority complex, comparing it to those analyzed in Frantz Fanon's Black Skin, White Masks.

==== Aesthetic labor ====
Zhang advocated transforming work into play within his utopian society. To this end, he proposed that state-sponsored vocational schools should be established for all fields of work (with cooks, maids, rickshaw-pullers, carpenters, gardeners and prostitutes specifically mentioned) in an effort to organize each into both a science and an art form. Although some forms of work are purely a matter of manual labor, he argued that incorporating aesthetic and scientific elements into these trades would be beneficial. Using rickshaw-pulling for example, Zhang posited that education on the mechanics of rickshaws and the proper posture, breathing, and gait while pulling them would bring joy to an otherwise menial task.

Zhang embraced the sexual division of labour in his political philosophy. He argued that the division of labor does not violate equality between the sexes, but instead recognized their respective strengths and weaknesses. He described men as brutish "worker bees" more inherently suited for manual labor (requiring physical might and an ability to tolerate filth). Meanwhile, he believed women (being more emotionally inclined in his view) would be best suited for homemaking, artistic and service work, and international diplomacy.

=== Sexology ===
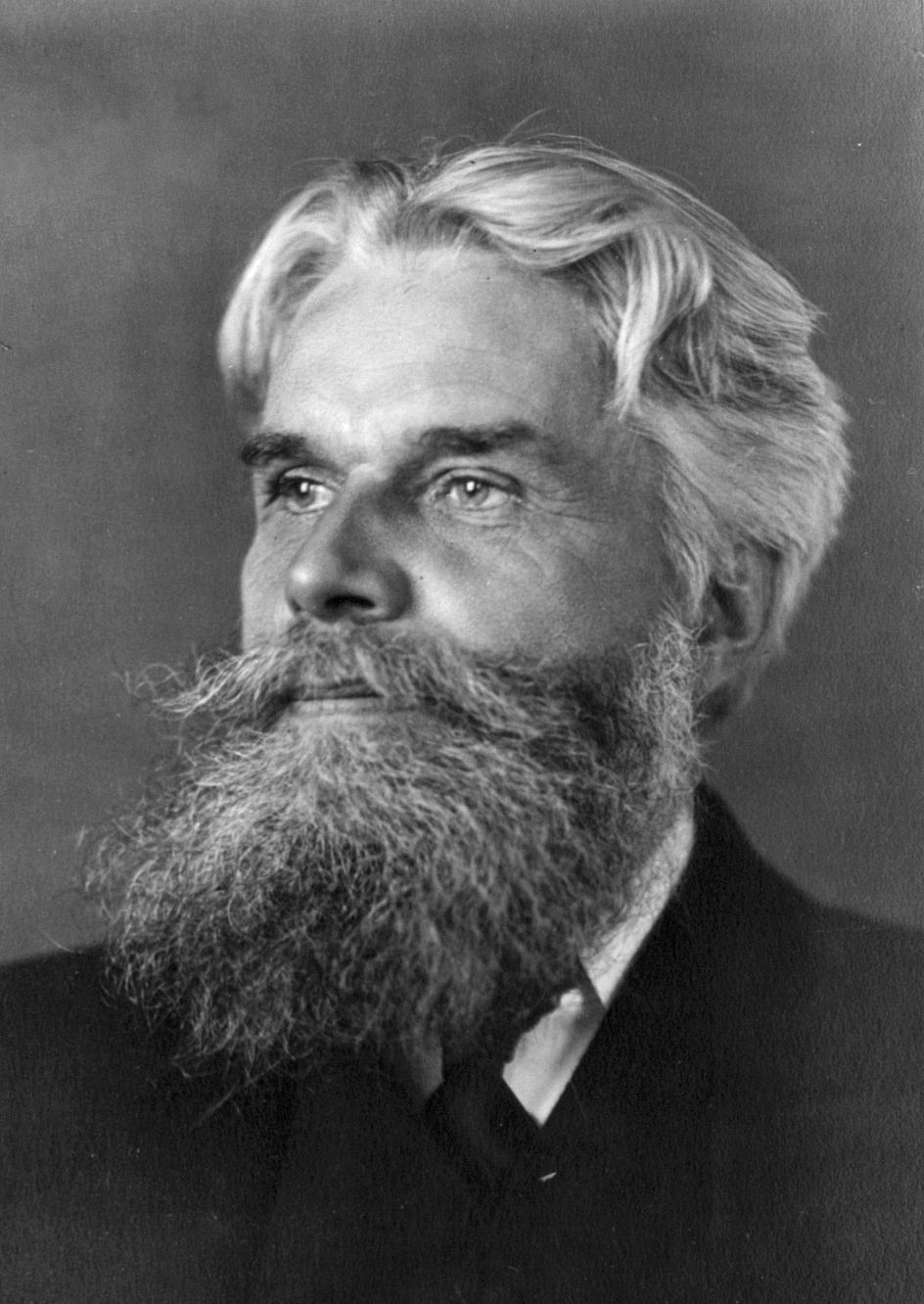
The work of Havelock Ellis inspired Zhang to study sexology, and loosely influenced his theories.

Zhang was inspired by the work of British physician Havelock Ellis, who systematically analyzed human sexuality through case studies and psychological analysis. Zhang wrote that Ellis's work inspired him to begin his scientific studies of sex and to create Sex Histories, borrowing its use of case studies.

Zhang's theory of sexual practice, loosely incorporating Ellis's, centers around the absorption of sexual fluids produced during sex. In his model of ideal, pleasurable sex, women would absorb semen from men, while men would absorb three kinds of fluid from women: the first from the labia, the second from the clitoris, (Note: In the historian Frank Dikötter's recounting of Zhang's beliefs, the first fluid comes from the clitoris, while the second comes from the vaginal walls.) and the third from the Bartholin's glands. This last fluid, which Zhang names the "Third Kind of Water" (第三種水; Dìsānzhǒng shuǐ), was the focus of his instructions. Zhang saw sexual pleasure as conducive to the vitality of fertilized egg cells, believing that they could be strengthened by the "Third Kind of Water" to produce children with greater intelligence and physical strength. For this to take effect, both partners must have simultaneous orgasms. As such, Zhang recommended that men train their stamina and incorporate extensive foreplay into their sex. The stronger children produced by such sex would in turn strengthen the Chinese nation. Zhang said that his conceptualization of orgasms and the "Third Kind of Water" was inspired by British eugenicist Marie Stopes's 1922 book Married Love, in which she argues that a "coital embrace" after orgasm would enable the couple to absorb each other's sexual fluids.

Zhang described sex as both a form of play and a form of work. Unlike many other sexologists in his time, he did not explore sexual perversion or psychosexual disorder, although he opposed what he regarded as sexual immorality, including homosexuality and masturbation. He viewed male–female sex as the only legitimate form of sexual intercourse. In Sex Histories, he described sodomy (non-vaginal sex) as "abnormal, dirty, meaningless, and inhuman". He considered depictions of what he considered abnormal sexuality—such as same-sex intercourse or bestiality—as inherently obscene and pornographic outside of a scientific analysis. He criticized the use of aphrodisiacs, which he compared to opium, warning that once someone became addicted to them, they could no longer have sex without them.

Zhang advocated that couples sleep in separate beds or rooms to reduce the frequency of sexual intercourse, which he recommended having only once or twice a week. He outlined a series of "control methods" for a husband to gain the affection of his wife, including sharing household chores, holding open-air dinners, and gifting flowers. He claimed that the vagina and labia minora would suck in the penis during sex if the woman was properly stimulated, allowing "the male and female organs to harmonize most perfectly", producing positive and negative currents. He also believed that genitals were able to "breathe", a concept ridiculed by his opponents.

Zhang's theory of sexual practice was denounced as Daoist sexual alchemy by his contemporaries. However, it differed from Daoist sexual practices due to its emphasis on sexual pleasure and the exchange of bodily fluids, as opposed to Daoist spiritual practices such as huanjing bunao which sought to avoid ejaculation.

==== "Big Breast Renaissance" ====
Zhang was heavily opposed to the practice of breast binding, publishing an article in New Culture in June 1927 calling for a "Big Breast Renaissance" (大奶復興; Dànǎi fùxīng). With flat chests seen as a symbol of purity and virginity, binding emerged among Chinese women by the end of the Qing dynasty. This popularity continued during the Republican period, where it was often accomplished through the "little vest" (小背心; Xiǎo bèixīn), a form of vest-shaped binder. In the wake of the successful anti–footbinding movement, an anti–breast binding movement emerged during the 1920s.

Zhang posited that women had more intense sexuality the larger their breasts were. He criticized the practice of breast binding as limiting both women's and men's sexual pleasure; he equated this to suicide, seeing it as taking away the inherent positivity and joy of life. He theorized that the spirits of the most intelligent women were found in their breasts, and that it was important for men to suck their partners' breasts during sex to ensure their partners' pleasure. An article falsely published under his name praised breast binding, infuriating Zhang, who responded that he was the first man in China to take a strong stance against the practice. Support of breast binding would have run against his theory of sexual practice. His advocacy against the practice earned him another nickname in the popular press, "Dr. Big Breasts" (大奶博士; Dànǎi bóshì).

== Legacy ==
No compilation of Zhang's writings had been made by his death in 1970. His son Zhang Chao (张超), an official in Raoping County, collected his writings during the 1980s, seeking to publicize his work. During the early 1980s, the county government of Raoping made efforts to publish his writings and rehabilitate his image, claiming that he was the first person from Chaozhou to receive a doctorate. A county archival unit published a pamphlet commemorating him in 1984, containing various eulogies and short essays. Zhang's former residence in Raoping, destroyed during land reform in 1952, was rebuilt by the county government in 2004 and converted into Dr. Zhang Jingsheng Park (张竞生博士公园; Zhāng Jìngshēng bóshì gōngyuán). It serves as a memorial to his life and work, as well as a regional sex education center. In 2011, it was declared a county-level historical site.

In 1988, the Raoping government published the first collection of his writings, titled Selected Works of Zhang Jingsheng, to celebrate the hundredth anniversary of his birth. Its title bore calligraphy by another noted Chaozhou scholar, Jao Tsung-I, legitimizing Zhang's work. This collection did not include Sex Histories, likely due to obscenity laws. The first republication of Sex Histories in its entirety was produced in 2005 by Dala Books, a Taipei-based erotica publisher, while a republication in mainland China was not released until 2014, in an edition published by the World Books Company. A 2008 Chinese-language biography of Zhang, The Literary Monster and the Prophet (文妖與先知; Wényāo yǔ xiānzhī) was produced by Zhang Peizhong, a writer from Raoping.

=== Reception and analysis ===
Although he was briefly popular among the Chinese intellectual community in the early 1920s for his first two books, Sex Histories devastated Zhang's reputation and invited widespread mockery. The most intense criticism of his work came from New Culture academics such as Zhang Xichen (a sexual reform-advocate and editor of The New Femininity magazine), as they saw him as detrimental to public support of a new sexual morality. Zhou Jianren, the science editor of the Commercial Press, argued with Zhang over the definitions of science and pornography. Zhang Jingsheng had largely ceased to participate in academia by the 1930s.

In his memoirs, Zhang characterized himself as a misunderstood intellectual who fell victim to the sexually conservative backlash against his work. Favorable analyses of his thought often share similar themes, describing him as a visionary who was "born in the wrong time". This idea was stated less charitably by the writer Lu Xun in a 1926 letter to his partner Xu Guangping, describing Zhang as belonging to the 25th century, far too radical and irrelevant to the intellectual climate of his own era. The translator and novelist Lin Yutang recalled Zhang favorably in a 1953 article, comparing him to a contemporary American sexologist, Alfred Kinsey. He bemoaned that "while Kinsey is still pursuing his great work, our Zhang Jingsheng is keeping silent and lying low." In 1962, Taiwanese literary critic Li Ao wrote that Zhang became one of the "three big literary monsters" of Republican China (alongside painter Liu Haisu and musician Li Jinhui), but declared that the "tides of the times would prove that 'literary monsters' were prophets after all."

Posthumous attitudes towards Zhang and his work have varied and generally center on his sexology. The writer and scholar Leo Ou-fan Lee, in his 1973 text The Romantic Generation of Modern Chinese Writers, made one of the first analyses of Zhang as he relates to broader Sinology (the study of Chinese culture and history). He described him as an extremist with "unprecedented radicalism" and a "vitalistic exaltation of sex". However, Lee cautions against interpreting his work as "the weird product of a deranged mind", writing that he mainly copied existing strains of modern Chinese philosophy (such as Liang Qichao's idea of the "new citizen") and intensified them to their most extreme form. Sexologist Pan Suiming, writing in 1998, defended Zhang's reputation as a sexologist, arguing that his methodology in compiling Sex Histories was in line with other scholars during the period, while Chen dubbed him a "lonely rebel" who "fell before his army had emerged victorious". Sociologist and sexologist Liu Dalin praised Zhang as the "true pioneer of sex education in China", noting his advocacy of birth control and association of sex education with a healthier society.

Western scholarly assessments of him have also varied: the Dutch historian Frank Dikötter is largely dismissive towards Zhang when discussing the history of sexuality in modern China, sarcastically naming him a "sex revolutionary", while the translator Howard Seymour Levy (who produced the sole English translation of Sex Histories in 1967) lauds him as producing "China's first modern treatise on sex education".
