= Stratz =

Stratz also spelled Strätz is a German, Slovak surname. Notable people with the surname include:

- Carl Heinrich Stratz, German-Russian gynecologist
- Mike Stratz, American golf course architect
- Hans-Peter Stratz, German Olympic wrestler
- Rudolph Stratz, German author
- Ursula Strätz, German actress
- Stephen Stratz, American Engineer, Of German Descent (Co-Owner Of AsicNorth, Inc )
- Victor Strätz Quintino, Brazilian, Of German Descent ( NASA Space Apps Winner, 2019, Florianópolis. Hackathon )
