= Zhulin yeshi =

Chinese erotic novel

- Chinese: 株林野史
- Literal meaning: Zhulin coarse stories
Transcriptions
Standard Mandarin
- Hanyu Pinyin: Zhūlín yěshǐ

A page from chapter one of Zhulin yeshi

Zhulin yeshi (Chinese: 株林野史) (Note: Translated into English as Coarse Stories from the Fief of Zhulin, Coarse Stories from Zhulin, The Romantic History of Zhulin, or The Unofficial History of the Bamboo Grove.) is a Chinese erotic novel by a writer under the pseudonym Chi Daoren, published between 1610 and 1620. Set in the 7th century BC, it follows a young woman and her sexual escapades.

== Plot ==
Set in around 600 BC during the Spring and Autumn period, a young and unmarried lady named Su'e (素娥) dreams of being taught the art of love-making by Taoist master Hua Yue (華月). First using her newfound sexual prowess to attain eternal youth, she then seduces multiple men until she is stopped by a rival Taoist master who becomes her lover and joins her in her quest for immortality.

== Publication history ==
Comprising sixteen chapters and twenty-one poems, Zhulin yeshi was written in the late Ming dynasty by an anonymous writer using the pseudonym Chi Daoren (痴道人), translated into English as "Infatuated Moralist" or "Man of the Crazy Way". The novel was published in Suzhou and likely had its first printing sometime between 1610 and 1620, although it was subsequently banned by the Qing government.

== Inspiration ==
The title of the novel is derived from the song "Zhulin" (株林, "tree forest") collected in the Book of Songs; according to the critic Kong Yingda (孔穎達) in Mao Shi zhengyi (毛詩正義), the song was written to rebuke Lord Ling of Chen (陳靈公) for his illicit sexual relationship with the femme fatale and noblewoman Xia Ji (夏姬), whose "destructive beauty ... nearly caused the collapse of the state of Chen" and "who was traditionally numbered among the most wicked women of Chinese antiquity." In Zhulin yeshi, the main protagonist is based on Xia Ji, although she is referred to as Su'e, which is in turn an apparent reference to the "extremely rare" illustrated erotic novel titled Su'e pian (素娥篇; published c. 1610).

Numerous stories concerning "a woman achieving first eternal youth and then transcendency through esoteric sexual practices with multiple partners" predate Zhulin yeshi. For instance, in the Liexian Zhuan (列仙傳), a female protagonist named Nü Wan (女丸) is guided by a mystery sex master. Likewise, in the Han dynasty text Yufang mijue (玉房秘訣) or Secret Instructions from the Jade Chamber, the Taoist mistress Xiwangmu (西王母) is described as engaging in "sexual vampirism".

Across the novel, the author adapts sexually explicit scenes from several other sources. For example, a scene in which the protagonist is in Chu, left in a pitiful state with her step-son, is "a cut-and-paste piece taken straight" from Wushan yanshi (巫山豔史) or Romantic History of Mt. Wu. Zhulin yeshi also presents an "extremely confused" discussion of sex toys; a dildo, for instance, morphs into a Burmese bell without any explanation, which Olivia Milburn suggests may be due to a "garbled interpolation from some unknown source."

== Literary significance and reception ==
Zhulin yeshi is noted for its "rich descriptions of sexual life", both heterosexual and homosexual. Olivia Milburn writes that the female protagonists of the novel "are in striking contrast to those described in other contemporary Ming-dynasty erotic novels". She also praises the author of Zhulin yeshi for their "careful erudition" and meticulous "historical background and characterizations".
