= Sex Histories =

1926 Chinese sexology book

Sex Histories Part I
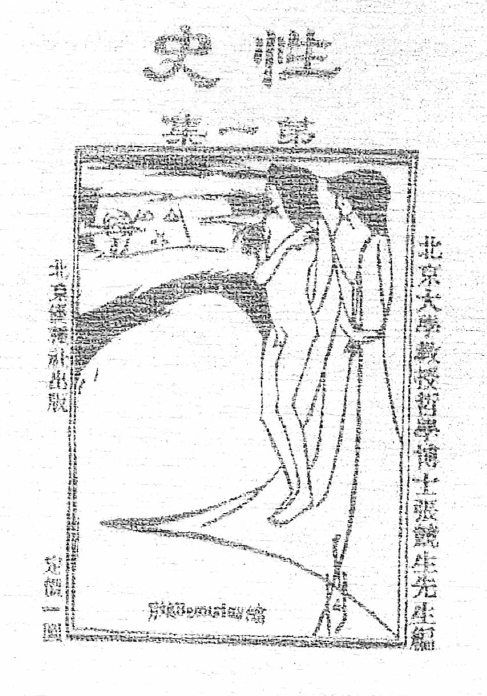
- Author: Zhang Jingsheng
- Original title: 性史第一輯
- Genre: Nonfiction
- Publisher: Beijing Eugenics Society
- Publication date: May 1926
- Publication place: Republican China

Sex Histories Part I (性史第一輯; Xìngshǐ dìyījí, often simply called Sex Histories, 性史; Xìngshǐ) is a 1926 book by Chinese philosopher and sexologist Zhang Jingsheng.

On 2 February 1926, Zhang published an article in the Beijing periodical Jingbao Fukan titled "The Best Pastime for a Winter Vacation: An Announcement for the Colleagues of the Eugenics Society", soliciting detailed stories of readers' sexual experiences. Zhang said he received over two hundred submissions from this advertisement. Seven were featured in the book, with Zhang analyzing and commenting on them as case studies.

The book caused widespread scandal upon its release in May 1926. Sales were extremely high for an academic book in the period. Large numbers of pirated copies boosted its circulation beyond the initially small print runs. Educational institutions such as Peking University attempted to ban the book, but such bans backfired and resulted in more students seeking out the book.

A large number of unauthorized parodies and knock-offs of Sex Histories were produced by various authors following the book's release, many of which were brazenly pornographic parodies or excerpts from earlier erotic texts. Zhang Jingsheng himself was credited as the author of all of these supposed sequels and editions of Sex Histories, resulting in significant confusion among the general public on which books were actually produced by Zhang.

The first modern republication of Sex Histories in its entirety was produced in 2005 by Dala Books, a Taipei-based erotica publisher, while a republication in mainland China was not released until 2014, in an edition published by the World Books Company.
