= Huang Yikai =

Chinese woodcutter

Huang Yikai (Chinese: 黃一楷; pinyin: Huáng Yīkǎi; 1580–1622) was a Chinese woodcutter active during the late Ming dynasty.

== Early life ==
Huang was born in 1580 in Qiu (虬), a village in Xinan (新安), Anhui. His family had been in the engraving industry for generations and specialised in woodcuts done in the Hui (徽) style; after Huang was born, they relocated to Hangzhou.

== Career ==
Huang did woodcut illustrations for numerous novels, including Romance of the West Chamber The Lyrics in the Whorehouse, Picture of the Boudoir, Su'e pian, and The Peony Pavilion. Lianhong Zhou of the Kinsey Institute in Bloomington, Indiana, describes Huang's artistic style as "minute and exquisite".
