= Xia Ji =

Chinese noblewoman

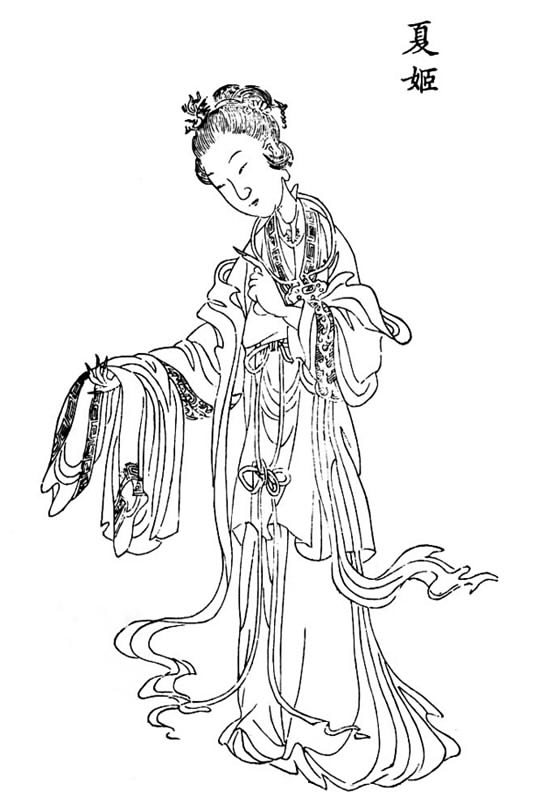
Xia Ji, 1870 edition Baimei xinyong tuzhuan (百美新詠圖傳, New Illustrated Poems about 100 Beautiful Women)

Xia Ji (Chinese: 夏姬; pinyin: Xià Jī; born c. 630 BC) (Note: Also known as Shao Kong (少孔) according to the Xinian (繫年).) was a Chinese noblewoman of the Spring and Autumn period known for her exceptional beauty, and who reportedly had multiple marriages in her lifetime. Her biography provided the basis for the late Ming dynasty erotic novel Zhulin yeshi, which depicts Xia Ji as a sexual vampire who supposedly achieved eternal youth and transcendency through esoteric sexual techniques designed to suck the vitality from her male partners.

== Biography ==
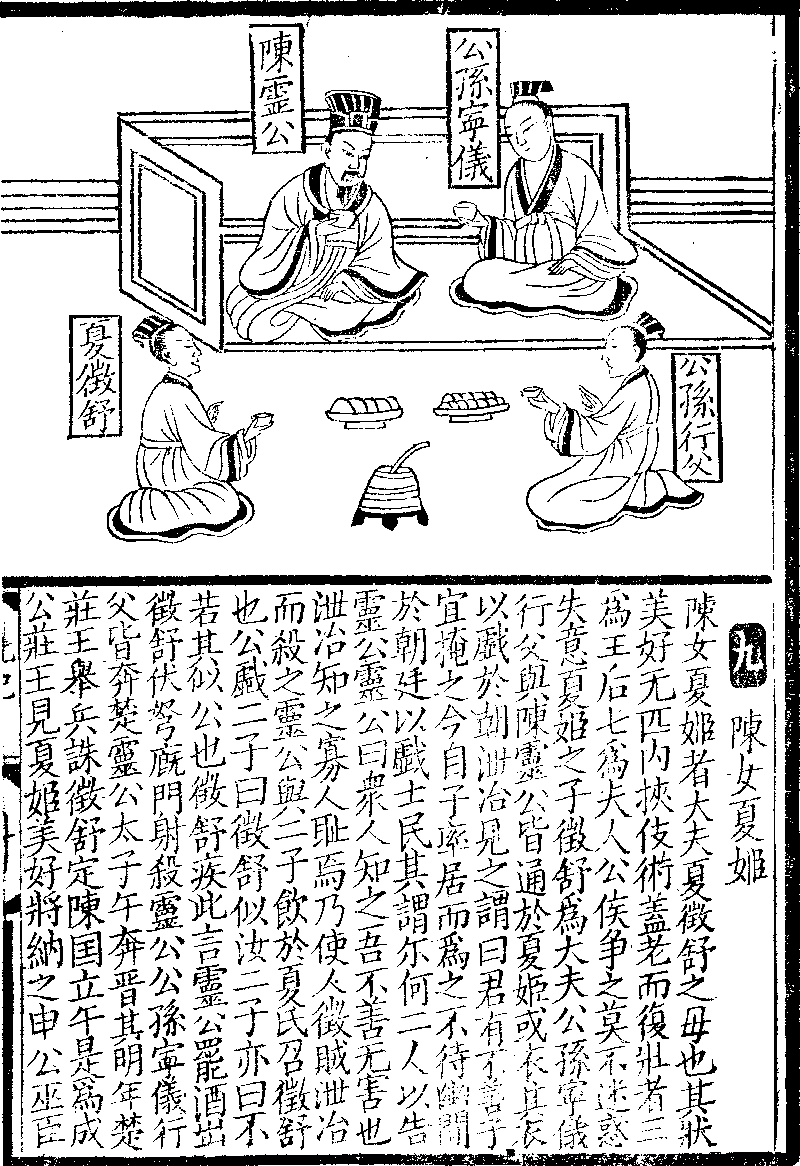
Duke Ling of Chen (陳靈公), Kong Ning (孔寧), Xia Zhengshu (夏徵舒), and Yi Xingfu (儀行父), 1842 Xinkan gu lienu zhuan (新刊古列女傳, New Edition of Ancient Biographies of Exemplary Women)

Xia Zhengshu assassinating Duke Ling of Chen in 599 BCE, 1919 Cibu congkan edition of Liu Xiang's Lienu zhuan (Biographies of Exemplary Women)

Liu Xiang's c. 18 BCE Lienü zhuan (Biographies of Exemplary Women) includes Xia Ji in the Niè bì zhuàn (孽嬖傳, Depraved Favorites) chapter. Compare the c. 4th-century BCE Zuozhuan historical references to Xia Ji, discussed here. Lady Xia Ji was the daughter of Lord Mu of Zheng (鄭穆公) and the younger sister of Duke Ling of Zheng (鄭靈公).

Xia Ji [夏姬], a woman of Chen, was the mother of the grandee Xia Zhengshu [夏徵舒] and the wife of Yushu [御叔]. She was a peerless beauty. She practiced the techniques of inner cultivation [內挾伎術] that enabled her to conceal her age and replenish her youth. Three times she served as queen and seven times as wife. Dukes and marquises competed for her, and each one became infatuated and lost all sense of purpose. Xia Ji's son, Zhengshu, was a grandee. Gongsun Ning [公孫寧], Yi Hangfu [儀行父], and Duke Ling of Chen [陳靈公, r. 613-599 BCE] were all engaged in illicit relations with Xia Ji. Sometimes, as a joke, they appeared at court wearing bits of her clothing or with her intimate garments draped inside their robes. Xie Ye [泄冶] saw this and told them, "If the ruler committed some indiscretion, you should conceal it. At present you yourselves are prompting the ruler to do these things, not waiting for a private moment of leisure at court, but making a game of it in the presence of officials and commoners. What do you mean by this?" The two men informed Duke Ling, who said, "That everyone knows that my indiscretion is harmless. But Xie Ye knowing about it makes me feel ashamed. He then ordered someone to ambush Xie Ye and kill him.

The Guoyu states that Gongzi Xia, the son of Duke Xuan of Chen (r. 692-648 BC), arranged the marriage between his son, Yushu and Xia Ji, who was the daughter of Duke Mu of Zheng (鄭穆公, r. 627-606 BC). This ambiguous neixie jishu (內挾伎術, "practiced the techniques of inner cultivation") is not found in any extant earlier sources. "Three times she served as queen and seven times as wife" is neither corroborated by other texts nor even found in this Lienu zhuan biography, which does not mention Xia Ji as a queen, and says she had three husbands, Xia Yushu, Xiang Lao, and Qu Wuchen. Zongsun Ning or Gong Ning (公寧) and Yi Hangfu or Yi Xingfu were high-ranking ministers of Chen.

Duke Ling and the two ministers were once drinking at the Xia residence and summoned Zhengshu. The duke joked with the two gentlemen, saying, "Zhengshu looks like you." The two gentlemen retorted, "Not as much as he resembles you." Zhengshu was stung by these words. When Duke Ling finished his wine and went out, Zhengshu, concealing himself behind the stable gate with a crossbow, shot and killed Duke Ling. Gongsun Ning and Yi Hangfu then both fled to Chu, while Wu [午], Duke Ling's heir apparent, fled to Jin. The next year, King Zhuang of Chu [莊王, r. 613–591 BCE] raised troops and executed Zhengshu. He brought stability to the state of Chen and made Wu the ruler. This was Duke Cheng [成公, r. 508-569 BCE].

When King Zhuang saw how beautiful Xia Ji was, he wanted to take her into his harem. Wuchen [巫臣], the Duke of Shen, remonstrated with him, saying, "This won't do. Your Majesty has punished an act of wrongdoing. But if you take Xia Ji, it will be seen as a matter of lust for this woman. Lusting after women is licentiousness, and licentiousness is a serious offense hope Your Majesty will think this over."

The king followed his advice. He ordered that an opening should be made in the rear wall [of the harem], through which she was released. General Zifan [子反] saw her beauty and also wanted to take her. Wuchen admonished him, saying, "She is a person of evil or [responsible for] the killing of Yushu, the murder of Duke Ling, the execution of Xia Nan [夏南], the flight of Kong and Yi, and the destruction of the state of Chen. There are many beautiful women in the world. Why must you choose her?"

Zifan therefore desisted. King Zhuang then married Xia Ji to the court deputy Xiang Lao [襄老]. But Xiang Lao died at Bi, and his corpse had not yet been recovered. His son, Heiyao [黑要], then began to have illicit relations with Xia Ji. Wuchen then met with Xia Ji, "Return home. I will make a formal petition of betrothal to you [there]."

King Gong [of Chu] came to the throne, and Wuchen was sent on a diplomatic mission to Qi. [When he left,] he took with him all of his household possessions and [instead] went to Zheng. [Upon his arrival] he asked someone to summon Xia Ji with the message, "The corpse can be recovered." Xia Ji then went to join him. Wuchen ordered his assistant to return to Chu the gifts [he had been given to present to Qi], and fled with Xia Ji to Jin. The grandee Zifan was infuriated with him and joined with Zichong [子重] to annihilate Wuchen's clan and divide his property.

Zifan (d. 575 BC) of Chu was also known as Prince Ce. Xia Nan is another name for Zhengshu.

The Odes (51) says, "A person like this,/Bent on marriage alone,/Utterly lacking in faith,/And ignorant of destiny." This ode shows how the allure of favorites leads to destruction. The Verse Summary says,

Xia Ji was a great beauty
Who annihilated states and destroyed Chen.
She caused the flight of two grandees
And the murder of her own son.
She nearly misled King Zhuang of Chu,
But brought destruction to Wuchen.
Zifan, vexed and alarmed,
Annihilated the Duke of Shen's family and seized his wealth.

== Legacy ==
According to the critic Kong Yingda (孔穎達) in Mao Shi zhengyi (毛詩正義), the song "Zhulin" (株林) collected in the Book of Songs was written to rebuke Lord Ling of Chen (陳靈公) for his illicit sexual relationship with Xia. The erotic novel Zhulin yeshi, written during the late Ming dynasty, is based on the life of Xia Ji.

Olivia Milburn describes Xia Ji as a femme fatale whose "destructive beauty ... nearly caused the collapse of the state of Chen" and "who was traditionally numbered among the most wicked women of Chinese antiquity." In contrast, Michael Nylan argues that she "was a victim of powerful men and her fate was determined by her beauty and their greed."
