= Ye Dehui =

Chinese writer and editor (1864–1927)

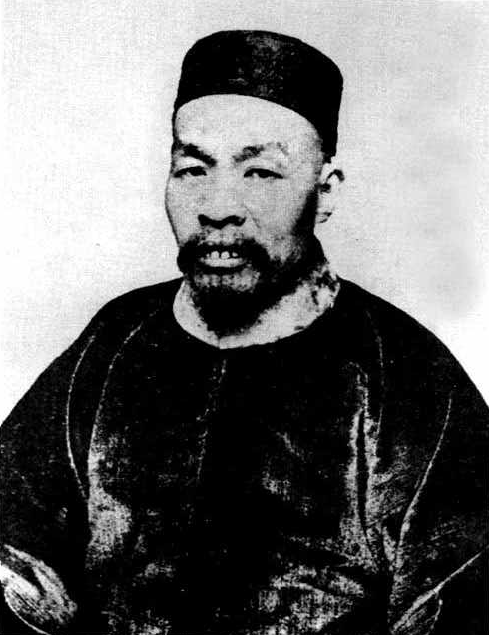
- Born: 1864; Changsha, Hunan, China
- Died: 11 April 1927 (aged 62–63); Changsha, Hunan, China
- Writing career
- Genre: Non-fiction

Ye Dehui (Chinese: 葉德輝; pinyin: Yè Déhuī; 1864 – 11 April 1927) was a Chinese writer and editor active during the Qing dynasty and the Republican Era. Vacillating between academia, business, and civil service in his early life, Ye eventually established himself as a leading bibliophile and literatus. He was ultimately executed by the local Communist government for his alleged counter-revolutionism.

== Early life ==
Ye was born in 1864 in Changsha, Hunan. He was the son of a government official in Hebei. After passing his entry-level imperial examinations, Ye briefly pursued a career in business, becoming a successful trader with interests in rice, salt, and textiles. In 1892, he obtained the jinshi degree. The same year, he became a secretary at the Board of Civil Office but found the job unsatisfying and quit after a few months.

== Career ==
As an editor and publisher, Ye is known for his Shuangmei jing’an congshu (雙梅景闇叢書; literally Shadow of the Double Plum Tree Anthology), which collects four Chinese medical classics on sexual cultivation that had been partially preserved in the Ishinpō: the Sunü jing; Yufang mijue; Yufang zhiyao; and Dongxuan zi. First published in 1907, Ye's anthology "outraged" the Chinese public, although it was later described in the 1950s by Joseph Needham as "the greatest Chinese sexological collection".

Ye was one of the most prolific collectors of rare books and manuscripts in China. In 1910, he published a guide to book-collecting and in 1915, he released a catalogue of the 350,000-odd volumes in his personal collection. Ye also occasionally tried his hand at prose and poetry.

== Views ==
Unlike his contemporaries Kang Youwei and Liang Qichao, Ye was vehemently opposed to Western intellectualism and opined that the decline of modern China was due to the people's "deviation from tradition". Ye also found Christianity to be inferior to Confucianism; he believed that there was "much absurdity" in the Old Testament and that "the religion of Jesus ... cowed people into submission." In 1900, Ye was arrested and briefly imprisoned for his suspected involvement in the anti-foreign and anti-Christian Boxer Rebellion.

== Death ==
Ye was a staunch anti-communist. Upon the arrival of the Chinese Communist Party in Changsha in 1927, Ye composed a derogatory couplet that referred to the communists as "beasts" and "half-breeds". He was brought to trial by the Chinese Communist Party on 1 April 1927. Ten days later, on 11 April 1927, Ye and several other alleged counter-revolutionaries were executed by shooting. A "definitive" collection of his works was posthumously published by his son in 1935.
