= Yufang mijue =

Chinese sex manual from Han dynasty

- Chinese: 玉房秘訣
Transcriptions
Standard Mandarin
- Hanyu Pinyin: Yùfáng mìjué
- Wade–Giles: Yü-fang pi-chüeh

Yufang mijue (Chinese: 玉房秘訣), translated into English as Secrets from the Jade Chamber, Secret Formulae from the Jade Alcove, or Secret Instructions from the Jade Chamber, is a Chinese sex manual composed during the Han dynasty.

== Publication history ==
Written during the Han dynasty, the original text is lost, though it was partially preserved in the Japanese medical text Ishinpō (醫心方). In 1903, Chinese sexologist Ye Dehui (葉德輝) published an almost fully reconstructed version of Yufang mijue, alongside four other ancient Chinese texts on sexuality; this was not well-received by the public, and in 1927 the Chinese Communist Party executed Ye for being a "counter-revolutionary".

== Contents ==
Presented as a compilation of quotations from various mythological and obscure figures, Yufang mijue discusses in detail numerous facets of sex, including days on which one is forbidden from having sex and male impotence. The text also echoes many principles taught in an earlier publication on Taoist sexology titled Su Nü Jing, and even includes fictitious dialogue between the Yellow Emperor and his "sexual mentor", the goddess Su Nü; for example, the Yellow Emperor asks her to elaborate on the benefits of "loving with infrequent ejaculation", to which she states:

When a man makes love once without ejaculating, he strengthens his body. Twice and his sight and hearing become more acute. Three times and all his diseases will be cured. Four times, his soul will be at peace.

== Literary significance ==
In Yufang mijue, the Taoist goddess Xiwangmu (西王母) is described as engaging in "sexual vampirism", and copulating with young boys in order to attain immortality—a claim that is not repeated in any other biography of Xiwangmu. Quoting from Yufang mijue, a chapter of Ishinpō details a method of penis enlargement involving powdered Zanthoxylum piperitum, Orobanche ammophyla, and Asarum, dried inside a dog's bladder for a month.
