= Chinese views on sin =

The concept of sin, in the sense of violating a universal moral code, was unknown in Chinese philosophy and folk religion until around the second century CE, when Buddhism arrived from India and religious Daoism originated. While English lexically differentiates theological sin from legal crime, the Chinese language uses one word zui 罪 meaning "crime; guilt; misconduct; sin; fault; blame."

== Terminology ==
In Chinese, there are two words that can be used to describe "sin": zui (Chinese: 罪; pinyin: zuì; Wade–Giles: tsui; lit. 'crime') and guo (simplified Chinese: 过; traditional Chinese: 過; pinyin: guò; Wade–Giles: kuo; lit. 'exceed'). According to the German sociologist Wolfram Eberhard, author of Guilt and Sin in Traditional China, zui can mean "crime, punishment of a crime, and sin", and guo can be used to describe unintentionally committed crimes or sins.

Apart from crime and sin, Zui can also be used to describe suffering, hardships and blame. Some zui compounds are ambiguous between "crime" and "sin". For example, youzui 有罪 (with "have; there is") which means guilty (of an offense). In contrast, some are unequivocal, such as fanzui 犯罪 (with "crime; criminal") which means to commit a crime or yuanzui 原罪 (with "origin; source") which refers to original sin.

The Chinese character 罪 for zui combines wang 罒 or 网 "net" over fei 非 "wrong", ideographically depicting, "A 网 net used to capture the criminal who has done 非 wrong". Zui was used to translate Chinese Buddhist terminology, for instance, zuizhang 罪障 (with "obstruction") "sin" and zuiye 罪業 (with "action") "sinful karma".

Zui 罪 "crime; guilt; punishment" had an archaic variant Chinese character zui 辠, written with zi 自 "nose" and xin 辛 "painful" — emphasizing the "punishment" aspect of zui. For instance, under traditional Chinese law, the excruciating Five Punishments included yi 劓 "cutting off the nose". The (121 CE) Shuowen Jiezi dictionary defined the original meanings of these homophonous zui characters as罪 "fish trap" and 辠 "crime; punishment" and noted Qin dynasty (221 BCE-206 BCE) imperial naming taboo made 辠 obsolete. The first Qin emperor Qin Shi Huang 秦始皇 forbid using zui 辠 "crime", which graphically resembled huang 皇 "emperor" in his name, and replaced it with zui 罪. In Modern Standard Chinese character usage, zui 罪 is common and zui 辠 is rare.

Guo nominally means "fault; mistake; error; excess" and verbally "pass by; go past; surpass; cross; exceed". The specialized sense of "sin" is usually limited to Daoist usage, except for the Chinese "synonym compound" zuiguo(r) 罪過(兒) "fault; wicked act; sin; offense", which is a humble expression for "guilty conscience; this is really more than I deserve."

Words meaning "sin; violation of religious law" are not a linguistic universal. For instance, the anthropologist Verrier Elwin, who studied the Gondi language, said, "There are no words in Gondi for sin or virtue: a man may be ruined, here and hereafter, for a breach of a taboo, but the notion of retribution for sinners is an alien importation". The Gondi language word pap "sin" is a loanword from the Marathi language. Fürer-Haimendorf explains that Christian missionaries discovered sin was not a universally shared concept across cultures. This raised questions about whether they believed some behaviour was deemed undesirable for the collective and if it influenced their relationship with the supernatural.

== Historical origins ==
The word zui 辠 or 罪 "crime; guilt" occurred in Chinese classics and bronze inscriptions from the Zhou dynasty (1046-256 BCE). Eberhard concluded that "sin" was unknown prior to the Han dynasty (206 BCE-220 CE).

If we apply our definition of "sin" – a violation of a divine code – Chinese folk religion before the Han period (206 B.C.) seems not to have had the concept of sin, although it recognized a great number of supernatural beings. People who offended the deities, spirits, or other supernatural beings by not honoring them or by failing to sacrifice in the right way or at the right time might make them angry. The deities then could or would punish such people. An event of this kind was more or less like any offense against a human superior, with the only difference that deities were believed to be superior to humans; they formed, if this expression be permitted, a social class above the upper class in human society. This class of supernatural beings was structured: some deities had more, others less, power, but the structure was more like a class structure than like a bureaucratic one although one god was vaguely recognized as the highest of all.

The Chinese historian Yu Ying-shih disagreed with Eberhard's conclusion that early Chinese religions disregarded "sin" because our understanding of ancient Chinese religion is still developing. For instance, in the Analects Confucius “sin” (tsui) might suggest a violation against divine law.

However, none of the English Analects translations renders zui as "sin". This context (3/13) quotes Confucius explaining a rhymed adage about sacrificing to either the Kitchen God or ancestral spirits.

- "He who offends against Heaven has none to whom he can pray" (James Legge)
- "He who has put himself in the wrong with Heaven has no means of expiation left" (Arthur Waley)
- "If you incur blame with Heaven, you have nowhere to turn for forgiveness" (Burton Watson)
- "If you offend Heaven, there is no one you can pray to" (A. Charles Muller)

Bodde also disagreed with Eberhard because a broad statement is made while our knowledge of ancient Chinese religion is still developing.

== Chinese Buddhism ==
The history of Chinese Buddhism began circa the 1st or 2nd century CE when Silk Road Buddhist missionaries (originally perceived as foreign Huang-Lao Daoists) arrived in China.

Defining "folk Buddhism" as "a simplified form which even the uneducated could understand," folk Buddhism rapidly brought notions of sins and their punishments to China, with texts from the second century CE noting out various punishments experienced in various hells. This belief acted to address the perennial concern of the good lives granted to so many immoral people, a question that had been resigned to the mystery of fate in pre-Buddhist ethics.

Ming 命 "life; fate; destiny; command" was personified in the Siming 司命 (lit. "Controller of Fate"), who arbitrated human destiny.

When Buddhist missionaries, such as An Shigao (d. 168 CE), began translating sūtras into Chinese, they used zui 罪 "crime; guilt" for Sanskrit pāpa or pāpá पाप "evil, misfortune, bad luck, trouble, mischief, harm; sin, vice, crime, guilt." Pāpa arises from intentions and actions that are akuśala "evil; inauspicious; unwholesome", which is translated as Chinese e 惡 "evil" or bushan 不善 "not good; unholy; bad; evil". Damien Keown explains, "Essentially, pāpa is that which leads one away from nirvāṇa, and is closer to the concept of error than an offence against divine authority or a condition innate in human nature such as original sin."

Buddhist monks and nuns practice pāpa-deśanā "confession of sins/infringements (of the Patimokkha code)", which Chinese transliterates as chanhui 懺悔 "repent; confess". The alternate term xiangbihui 向彼悔 "repent sins to others" (from pratideśanīya) emphasizes publicly confessing to the monastic sangha "community". Buddhist confession is not considered an appeal for divine absolution, but an aid to spiritual progress and clearing karmic obstacles.

In the 5th century, Chinese Buddhists used wei 穢 "dirty; vile; abominable; ugly" to denote "sin", and correspondingly, "the Buddhist 'paradise,' the place in which there is no sin" is called jingtu 淨土 "clean land; pure land".

The Buddhist notion of "sin", translated as Chinese zui, was explained in terms of karma and reincarnation. Thus, in the understanding of folk Buddhism, sin was not seen as a transgression against a deity, but instead a transgression against a universal moral code, to which even the deities were held to. This moral code transcended questions of legal recourse, irrespective of one being dealt with societal punishment, one would still be punished for their action on a karmic level. Furthermore, the "divine ministries and divine red tape" of modern Chinese folk religion acted as "a system of bureaucratic constitutional monarchy".

Buddhism opposes pāpa "sin; demerit" with punya "merit; meritorious action", referring to karmic merit gained from actions like giving alms, reciting sutras, and performing puja devotions. The Chinese translation of punya is gong 功 " achievement; result; skill; meritorious service", compounded in gong-guo 功過 "achievements and errors; merits and sins".

The ethnologist Christoph von Fürer-Haimendorf described the importance of karmic "merit" in Chinese spiritual thought,

… as Buddhism spread into China from the first century A.D. onwards the idea of sin and the punishment of sins gained wide currency. Indeed, the systematisation of such punishments in numerous minutely described hells reflects the Chinese genius for classification. These supernatural punishments for violations of an impersonal moral code were independent of the mechanism of human justice. There was a strong emphasis on the feeling of guilt. Even if sinful actions remained undetected by society, the sinner knew that they were recorded by supernatural powers, and that punishment would inevitably follow after death. But like Tibetan Buddhists the Chinese believed that sins could be outweighed by meritorious actions. Hence feelings of guilt stimulated the giving of alms and support for monks and religious institutions.

The Buddhist scholar Alfred Bloom refuted the common Western belief that Chinese and Japanese religions have no sense of "sin" or "guilt".

Sin and guilt are generally viewed from a Christian perspective in which sin is rebellion against the will of God, and consequent guilt is the feeling of rejection by the divine. Such sin and guilt is, of course, not experienced in the Buddhist context. However, it may be possible to employ the terms, or similar terms such as "depravity" or "defiled" to depict man's involvement in the passions and bondage to the world which prevents him from attaining the high Buddhist ideals revealed in Sakyamuni and his early disciples. Such people realize that they fall short of the potentialities of the human nature symbolized in Buddha. Their guilt is derived not from a feeling of rejection by deity, but by a self-rejection as they become aware of the gulf which separates them from the ideals of the Buddha.

Some Buddhist Schools, such as Pure Land, teach that we are currently in the degenerate and immoral Mappō "Latter Day of the Dharma", and can find salvation from sin through faith in Amitābha.

== Daoism ==
Early Daoist religious movements – Yellow Turban, Celestial Master, and Highest Clarity schools – believed that guo 過 "excess; sin" causes sickness and confession cures it. The recorded history of Daoist "sin" began in the 2nd-century CE, contemporaneous with the Buddhist introduction of zui 罪 "guilt; sin".

The role of "sin" in Daoism is frequently misconstrued. For instance, one introductory text claims, "Taoism has no doctrine of sin. Ethics should be incidental to spiritual values, and indeed, there is no ideograph in Chinese which conveys the Western conception of sin and a sense of guilt." As mentioned above, zui 罪 means both "sin" and "guilt."

=== Yellow Turban ===
The Yellow Turban Rebellion (184-205 CE) against the Han dynasty was led by Zhang Jue, who founded Taiping Dao "The Way of Great Peace", based on the Taiping Jing "Scripture of Great Peace." According to Stephen Bokenkamp,

The Yellow Turbans converted people to their cause through healing practices, including old methods such as incantation and doses of water infused with the ashes of talismans, and a new one – confession of sins. This latter practice is significant. The Scripture of Great Peace relates confession to the idea that political and cosmic diseases are caused by humans and must be cured on the individual level. Sin, in this text, is the failure to act in accord with one's social role, thereby blocking the circulation of the Dao's energies.

This scripture teaches that sins result in natural disasters, epidemics, social discontent, and war. "Evil has accumulated for innumerable generations through the inheritance of sins", and heaven has sent the Celestial Master to save humanity. The Scripture of Great Peace gives examples of the six worst sins, such as accumulating Dao "the way" or De "inner power" without teaching them to others, and accumulating riches without aiding the poor.

The Taiping Jing introduced the Daoist dogma of chengfu 承負 "inherited burden", roughly comparable with Christian ancestral sin. Toshiaki Yamada explains that chengfu "refers to the liability for sins and transgressions that individuals and societies inherit from their predecessors. As fault and blame are passed from one generation to another, calamities and misfortune increase." Later generations can make amends for the sins of their ancestors, through reflective siguo 思過 "considering sin", confessional shouguo 首過 "admitting sin"), and corrective zize 自責 "blaming oneself". Daoist chengfu fundamentally differs from Buddhist karma.

In Buddhism, the good and evil performed by an individual in past lives is reflected in what form his or her present life takes, and good and evil behavior in the present life determines future rebirth. Chengfu, by contrast, not only considers the past and future lives of the individual, but also that individuals inherit the results of the good and evil of the behavior of their ancestors, and that these results accumulate not only at the individual level, but also at the social level. In this sense, "inherited burden" is based on the unit of the family and, as its extension, of society.

=== Celestial Master ===
The Tianshi Dao Way of the Celestial Masters, founded by Zhang Daoling in 142 CE, taught that the gods maintained celestial registers of good and evil deeds, and regarded sickness as divine punishment for sins.

The Celestial Masters adapted Yellow Turban beliefs about sin, in which sin was seen to be the cause of sickness and other ailments, and was best absolved through, often public, confession, as well as other penitential acts that fostered either self-reflection or community service. For the sickness caused by these sins, confession was also used, as well as holy water, as the root cause of ill health was perceived to be sin. In this system, there was no strong demarcation between legal and moral dimensions, with the gods acting as recordkeepers of misdeeds.

In cases where Daoist religious practices did not cure sickness, "the failure was said to be caused by their not keeping faith with the Dao".

The tutan zhai 塗炭齋 "mud and ashes retreat" was a Celestial Master ritual meant to rescue the participants and their ancestors from sufferings in diyu 地獄 "earth prison; hell; naraka; purgatory". A Taoist priest would daub his face with mud and ashes (a synecdoche for flood and fire and metaphor for suffering) in penitence, lie on the (preferably frozen) ground, with hands tied behind his back (like a criminal), and confess past sins.

=== Highest Clarity ===
The Shangqing "Highest Clarity" School also believed in both individual and ancestral sins. Jeaneane Fowler stated, "The unbreakable bond with ancestors was emphasized in the belief that the sins of the ancestors of several generations past still affected the individual of today. However, reciprocally, the relative sin or merit of a living individual could also affect that of past ancestors. And if that living individual were to achieve salvation, then so would the ancestors."

In Highest Clarity tradition, annual confession of sins was required on the autumnal equinox because that is the day when the spirits of one's body reported sins and transgressions to the Sage Lord.

=== Sacred Jewel ===
The Lingbao "Sacred Jewel" School of Daoism, which originated in the early 5th century, adapted Buddhist many precepts such as sin and reincarnation. The Sanyuan pin 三元品 "Precepts of the Three Primes" text lists 22 sins for "those who pursue the highest Dao":

- The sin to disregard the scriptures and precepts, harbor doubts or be in two minds about the teaching.
- The sin to despise the sagely writings or criticize the sacred scriptures.
- The sin to make light of the teachers or break the solemn oath.
- The sin to slander the elders or disregard the heavenly rules.
- The sin to steal the texts of the scriptures or practice without the proper teacher.
- The sin to study on your own, without a teacher, or transmit the teachings without proper authorization. ...

It further lists 145 sins for "students of the Dao and lay followers":

- The sin to pick a fight with a good fellow.
- The sin to speak evil or hypocrisy.
- The sin to criticize your teachers, elders, or anyone else.
- The sin to intoxicate yourself with wine and spirits.
- The sin to kill living beings or give rise to evil thoughts.
- The sin to harbor greed and passion, pride and sloth. ...

Beginning around the Song dynasty (960–1279), the idea of gongguo ge 功過格 "ledgers of merit and demerit" became widespread, with sins divinely calculated as demerit points.

Kristofer Schipper noted that although modern Daoists believe the sin of losing qi "vital energy" can lead to illness and accidents, sin "is not considered to be irreducible (there is no "original sin"). Neither it is something that is solely and simply moral, but is rather related to the equilibrium of the body."

== Chinese Christianity ==
The concept of "sin; offense against god" is a long-standing hamartiological problem for Christianity in China. Uhalley and Wu described it as a "notorious crux in Christian-Confucian dialogue"; "The central issues here are the doctrines of sin as an offense against God, original sin, and redemption, which are, for Christians, revealed doctrines. But all are absent from, rather than contrary to, Confucian values."

Early Jesuit missionaries generally translated Latin peccatum "sin" with the Buddhist term zui 罪 "guilt; sin" rather than the Daoist guo 過 "exceed; sin". Some semantically related Chinese words are chan 懺 "repent; regret; confess (sins)", hui 悔 "regret, repent; show remorse", chanhui 懺悔 "confess; repent", shezui 赦罪 " pardon (a criminal); forgive (a sinner)", zuiquian 罪愆 "offense; sin of omission", buke raoshu de zui 不可饶恕的罪 "mortal sin", and ke yuanliang de zui 可原谅的罪 "venial sin".

Some Christian missionaries in China apologetically blamed their lack of converts upon Chinese misunderstandings of "sin". John Griffith claimed, "Sin, however, in the Scriptural sense, is not recognized by their system. The contrast of good and evil, according to their view, resolves itself into a difference in degree." James Legge said neither Confucianism nor Daoism knew anything about the propitiation of sin, and, "The knowledge of God in Confucianism, which has become a heritage of the Chinese people, is very precious; but the restriction of the worship of Him to the sovereign has prevented the growth and wide development among them of a sense of sin." Dyer Ball described the "vague" Chinese idea of sin, and "the task of tasks is to bring home to the native mind the sense of what sin is.

In the 1980s-1990s, after the end of the Cultural Revolution, a number of Chinese Cultural Christians have advocated for the doctrine of original sin as having warrant in mainland China due to the sociopolitical unrest that it has recently experienced.

== Sociological aspects ==
Cultural anthropology traditionally distinguished two modalities of social control: a shame society based on inculcating feelings of shame and the threat of ostracism, and a guilt society based on feelings of guilt and the threat of punishment. Western scholars generally classify the Chinese and Japanese societies as shame based, emphasizing the psychological fear of losing face.

Eberhard explained that sin in Chinese culture can be defined as actions, behaviour, and thoughts which violate rules set up by supernatural powers. This violation of rules set by earthly powers results in the development of the emotional concept of ‘legal guilt’. Evidently, this notion of ‘sin’ and its accompanying emotions are ingrained within the internalised social norms of Chinese culture. The ‘shame’ context are not contradictory to sin but rather adhere to and strengthen Chinese social norms and laws.

Bode criticized this position: "Eberhard's separation of shame from guilt and sin seems to be too absolute and arbitrary. Surely in traditional China, as in other societies, all three feelings frequently entered into cases of wrongdoing, even though their proportions might vary according to the background of the particular wrongdoer."

Based on experiments in cross-cultural psychiatry, modern scholars doubt the thesis of a Chinese "shame culture."

== See also ==
- Bahá'í views on sin
- Buddhist views on sin
- Islamic views on sin
- Jewish views on sin
