= Su'e pian =

Chinese erotic novel

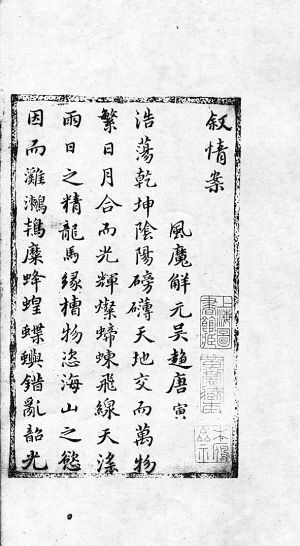
- A page from a late Ming printed edition
- Author: Yehua Sheng (鄴華生)
- Original title: 素娥篇
- Language: Chinese
- Publication date: c. 1610
- Publication place: China (Ming dynasty)
- Media type: Print

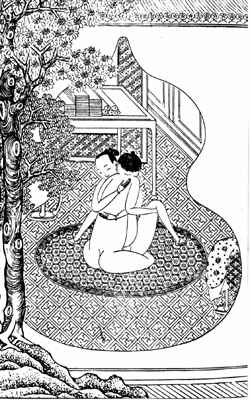
Woodcut illustration of a scene from the novel by Huang Yikai

Su'e pian (Chinese: 素娥篇; pinyin: Sù'é piān), also Su E Pian, translated into English as The Moon Goddess or The Lady of the Moon, is a Chinese erotic novel by an anonymous writer published in the late Ming dynasty. It follows the sexual escapades of Wu Sansi (武三思) and his concubine, Su'e (素娥).

== Plot ==
Wu Sansi (武三思), the wealthy and powerful nephew of Empress Wu Zetian, falls in love with the eponymous Su'e (素娥) and takes her in as a concubine. The novel describes forty-three sexual encounters between Wu Sansi and Su'e, each of which is artfully named and commemorated with a poem. Palace official Di Renjie (狄仁傑) insists on meeting Su'e after hearing of her exceptional beauty; she agrees after some hesitation, before revealing to Di that she is an immortal "Moon Lady". Su'e then departs to a higher dimension with Wu's spirit. Some time later, the couple are reportedly sighted at the Zhongnan Mountains.

== Content and publication history ==
Su'e pian is more than 10,000 Chinese characters long and comprises some forty-three chapters and ninety illustrations collected in four volumes. Each sexual position described in the novel is given a name such as "Stopping the Horse to Pull the Saddle" (駐馬板鞍), "Flowers Longing for Butterflies" (花開蝶戀), "Boat Widthwise Over the Ferry" (野渡橫舟), and "The Union of Yin and Yang" (囫圇太極).

The novel was written in Classical Chinese by an anonymous writer using the pseudonym Yehua Sheng (鄴華生). According to its preface, Su'e pian was engraved by Hangzhou-based engraver Huang Yikai (黃一楷), and published c. 1610. An English translation of the story was written by E. D. Edwards and published in Chinese prose literature of the Tang period (1935). A complete Ming edition of the novel, believed to be the only one left in existence and previously owned by Columbia University professor Wang Jizhen (王際真), is housed in the library of the Kinsey Institute for Research in Sex, Gender, and Reproduction in Bloomington, Indiana.

== Inspiration and influence ==
The anthology Ganze yao (甘澤謠) by Yuan Jiao (袁郊) records the short story of Su'e, an artist and poet who is also the concubine of Wu Zetian's nephew, Wu Sansi; Su'e later reveals herself as a "spirit of flowers and the moon" sent to Earth to "lure the human mind and body". The same story is also collected in Yaowang Zhuan (妖妄傳) by Zhu Xiji (朱希济), published in the Tang dynasty. The protagonist Su'e in Su'e pian is also inspired by the mythical goddess of the Moon, Chang'e. In the erotic novel Zhulin yeshi, published between 1610 and 1620, the main protagonist is referred to as Su'e, which Olivia Milburn suggests is a reference to Su'e pian.
