= Carl Heinrich Stratz =

German-Russian gynecologist

- Born: 14 June 1858; Odessa
- Died: 21 April 1924 (aged 65) the Hague
- Known for: Pioneering research in human growth and development
- Scientific career
- Fields: Gynecology

Carl Heinrich Stratz (14 June 1858 in Odessa – 21 April 1924 in the Hague) was a German-Russian gynecologist who was one of the first to research human growth and development.
