= Coitus reservatus =

Sexual practice

Coitus reservatus (from coitus, "sexual intercourse" and reservatus, "reserved"), also known as sexual continence, is a form of sexual intercourse in which a male does not attempt to ejaculate within his partner, avoiding the seminal emission.

Alice Stockham coined the term karezza, derived from the Italian word carezza meaning "caress", to describe coitus reservatus, but the idea was already in practice at the Oneida Community. The concept of karezza is loosely akin to maithuna in Hindu Tantra and sahaja in Hindu Yoga.

Ejaculation control was important for both genders, in Chinese it is called caiyin buyang (traditional Chinese: 採陰補陽; simplified Chinese: 采阴补阳; pinyin: Cǎi yīn bǔ yáng; lit. 'collect yin and replenish yang') for men and caiyang buyin (traditional Chinese: 採陽補陰; simplified Chinese: 采阳补阴; pinyin: Cǎi yáng bǔ yīn; lit. 'collect yang and replenish yin') for women, and was involved in Taoist sexual practices such as huanjing bunao (traditional Chinese: 還精補腦; simplified Chinese: 还精补脑; pinyin: Huán jīng bǔ nǎo), as well as Indian Tantra (where it is known as "asidhārāvrata") and Hatha Yoga (see vajroli mudra), although conventional ejaculation is also endorsed.

== Practice of karezza and sexual continence ==
Stockham writes, "Karezza signifies 'to express affection in both words and action', and while it fittingly denotes the union that is the outcome of deepest human affection, love's consummation, it is used technically throughout this work to designate a controlled sexual union." So that, in practice, according to Stockham, it is more than just self-control, but mutual control where the penetrative partner helps the receptive partner and vice versa. According to Stockham, this is the key to overcoming many difficulties in controlling sexual expression individually.

Stockham's contribution was to apply this same philosophy of orgasm control to women as much as to men. A form of birth control, the technique also prolongs sexual pleasure to the point of achieving mystical ecstasy. In this practice, orgasm is separated from ejaculation, making possible enjoyment of the pleasure of sexual intercourse without experiencing seminal ejaculation, while still experiencing orgasm.

Some would have the principles of karezza applied to masturbation, whereby a person attempts to delay orgasm as long as possible to prolong pleasure in a process known as "orgasmic brinkmanship", "surfing", or "edging", but this is different from the practice of "karezza" in partnered intercourse. In Latin literature, this is known as coitus sine ejaculatione seminis.

One purpose of karezza is the maintenance and intensification of desire and enjoyment of sexual pleasure within relationships. According to Stockham, it takes from two weeks to a month for the body to recover from ejaculation: "Unless procreation is desired, let the final propagative orgasm be entirely avoided". Stockham advocated that the 'honeymoon period' of a relationship could be maintained in perpetuity by limiting the frequency of ejaculations, or, preferably avoiding them entirely.

Kalman Andras Oszlar writes, "Inasmuch as sexual togetherness is not limited into the physical world and does not mean quick wasting of sexual energies, by this we give free way to higher dimensions in the relationship." Affected by this, we may get into the state of flow, and in the course of this, the couple charges up with energy, while – with focused attention (Dhāraṇā) – the couple is submerging in that in which they are having pleasure. This state of mind is connected with the beneficial effects of tantric restraint and transformation. At first, Mihály Csíkszentmihályi defined positive philosophy, and since then, it has been referred to beyond the professional line. According to the professor, the flow experience is an entirely focused and motivationally intensified experience where people can entirely focus and properly command their feelings for the best performance or learning.

There is a slight difference between karezza and coitus reservatus. In coitus reservatus, unlike karezza, a woman can enjoy a prolonged orgasm while a man exercises self-control.

Like coitus interruptus, coitus reservatus is not a reliable form of preventing a sexually transmitted infection, as the penis leaks pre-ejaculate before ejaculation, which may contain all of the same infectious viral particles and other microbes as the semen. Although studies have not found sperm in pre-ejaculate fluid, the method is also unreliable for contraception because of the difficulty of controlling ejaculation beyond the point of no return. Additionally, pre-ejaculate fluid can collect sperm from a previous ejaculation, leading to pregnancy even when performed correctly.

== Controversy ==
Alice Stockham was taken to court and forced to give up teaching the practice of karezza in the United States. Like many other sex reformers, Stockham was arrested by Anthony Comstock, who prosecuted a variety of sexual freedom reformers. Ida Craddock died by suicide after being repeatedly jailed for publishing documents on sexuality. The press attacked the Oneida Community and Noyes fled to Canada due to a warrant being issued for his arrest on a statutory rape charge on June 22, 1879. From there, he advised others to follow St. Paul's plan of either marriage or celibacy, and to obey the commandments against adultery and fornication.

== Views of the Catholic Church ==
Many theologians within the Catholic tradition approve of coitus reservatus with precise guidelines.

- In 6.918 of Moral Theology, St. Alphonsus Liguori allows it in marriage, if mutual (when both spouses restrain themselves from orgasm), according to citation by author Peter Gardella.
- In 1952, the Holy See warned that:
  Priests, in the care of souls and in directing consciences, never, either spontaneously or when asked, should presume to speak in such a way as if from on the part of the Christian law there would be nothing against the "reserved embrace."
  — Acta Apostolicae Sedis
  - John F. Harvey OSFS expressed this to mean that "confessors and spiritual directors should not presume that there is nothing objectionable" with it. This indicates it could become sinful under certain circumstances, for example, if ending in masturbation.
- Masturbation is defined by Fr. John Hardon SJ as:
  Direct stimulation of the sex organs outside of sexual intercourse. The self-stimulation can be physical, by means of some external object, or psychic, by means of thoughts and the imagination. It is a grave misuse of the procreative faculty and when done with full consent and deliberation is a serious sin. The sinfulness consists in setting in motion the generative powers while preventing them from achieving their natural, divinely intended purpose.
- In the article hosted on the US Conference of Catholic Bishops website, John F. Harvey OSFS confirmed and explained coitus reservatus. The spouses should avoid undue frustration. They must not intend orgasm for either of them.

This differs from non-penetrative, rubbing-only sex (mutual masturbation or manual sex) and differs from coitus interruptus because coitus reservatus ends with no orgasm at all for both spouses if practiced within guidelines from John F. Harvey OSFS referenced above.

== Oneida Community ==
The Oneida Community, founded in the 19th century by John Humphrey Noyes, experimented with coitus reservatus, which was then called male continence in a religiously Christian communalist environment. The experiment lasted for about a quarter of a century, and then Noyes created Oneida silverware and established the Oneida Silver Co., which grew into Oneida Limited. Noyes identified three functions of the sexual organs: the urinary, the propagative (reproductive), and the amative (sexual love). Noyes believed in the separation of the amative from the propagative, and he put amative sexual intercourse on the same footing as other ordinary forms of social interchange. Sexual intercourse as Noyes defines it is the insertion of the penis into the vagina; ejaculation is not a requirement for sexual intercourse.

== Western esotericism ==
=== Ida Craddock, C. F. Russell, and Louis T. Culling ===
Inspired by Ida Craddock's work Heavenly Bridegrooms, American occultist C. F. Russell developed a curriculum of sex magick. Culling defines that Dianism is "sexual congress without bringing it to climax" and that each participant is to regard their partner, not as a "known earthly personality" but as a "visible manifestation of one's Holy Guardian Angel.

=== Rosicrucian groups ===
AMORC does not recommend engaging in sexual practices of an occult nature. This has been so since their First Imperator H. Spencer Lewis, Ph.D. made it public knowledge.

The Fraternitas Rosae Crucis led by Dr. R. Swinburne Clymer engages in sexual practices for the sake of race regeneration. Dr. Clymer is completely opposed to the practice of karezza or coitus reservatus and advocates instead a form of sexual intercourse in which the couple experiences the orgasm at the same time.

The Secretary of the FUDOSI instead approved the practice of karezza to establish harmony in the family and the world by preventing the waste and misuse of sex energy.

Arnold Krumm-Heller established the Fraternitas Rosicruciana Antiqua (FRA), a Rosicrucian school in Germany with branches in South America, having the following formula of sexual conduct: "Immissio Membri Virile In Vaginae Sine Ejaculatio Seminis" (Introduce the penis in the vagina without ejaculating the semen). Samael Aun Weor experimented with that formula and developed the doctrine of The Perfect Matrimony.

== 20th-century Western writers ==
English novelist Aldous Huxley, in his last novel Island, wrote that Maithuna, the Yoga of Love, is "the same as what Roman Catholicism means by coitus reservatus." In regard to the Catholic view, Alan W. Watts in Nature, Man and Woman notes: "I would like to see someone make a case for the idea that the Apostles really did hand down an inner tradition to the Church, and that through all these centuries the Church has managed to guard it from the public eye. If so, it has remained far more secret and 'esoteric' than in any of the other great spiritual traditions of the world, so much so that its existence is highly doubtful". The Welsh writer Norman Lewis, in his account of life in Naples in 1944, wrote: "I recommended him to drink – as the locals did – marsala with the yolk of eggs stirred into it, and to wear a medal of San Rocco, patron of coitus reservatus, which could be had in any religious-supplies shop". The psychologist Havelock Ellis writes: "Coitus Reservatus, – in which intercourse is maintained even for very long periods, during which a woman may orgasm several times while the penetrative partner succeeds in holding back orgasm – so far from being injurious to a woman, is probably the form of coitus which gives her the maximum gratification and relief".

== Modern practice of Karezza ==
Marina Robinson and her husband Gary Wilson were promoters of Karezza through books, websites, and media interviews. Wilson claimed the practice cured his lifelong alcoholism and depression. Another prominent modern Karezza practitioner, Mary Sharpe, claimed the time after orgasm was a time of increased violence, even leading to terrorism, making it necessary to avoid orgasm.

Claims of the semen retention community and those of the NoFap community are among the least accurate concerning men's health.

== See also ==
- Coitus interruptus – Withdrawal method of birth-control
- Edging (sexual practice) – Orgasm control technique
- Eroto-comatose lucidity – Sex magic technique
- Orgone – Pseudoscientific concept by Wilhelm Reich
- Retrograde ejaculation – Redirection of ejaculated semen into the urinary bladder
- Sex magic – Magic involving sexual activity
- Tantric sex – Sexual practices associated with Hindu and Buddhist tantra
- Taoist sexual practices – Religious sexual practices
- Venus Butterfly – Sexual technique
- Huanjing bunao – Retrograde ejaculation in Daoism
- Soaking (sexual practice) – Mormon premarital sex avoidance method
