= Alice Bunker Stockham =

American obstetrician and writer (1833–1912)

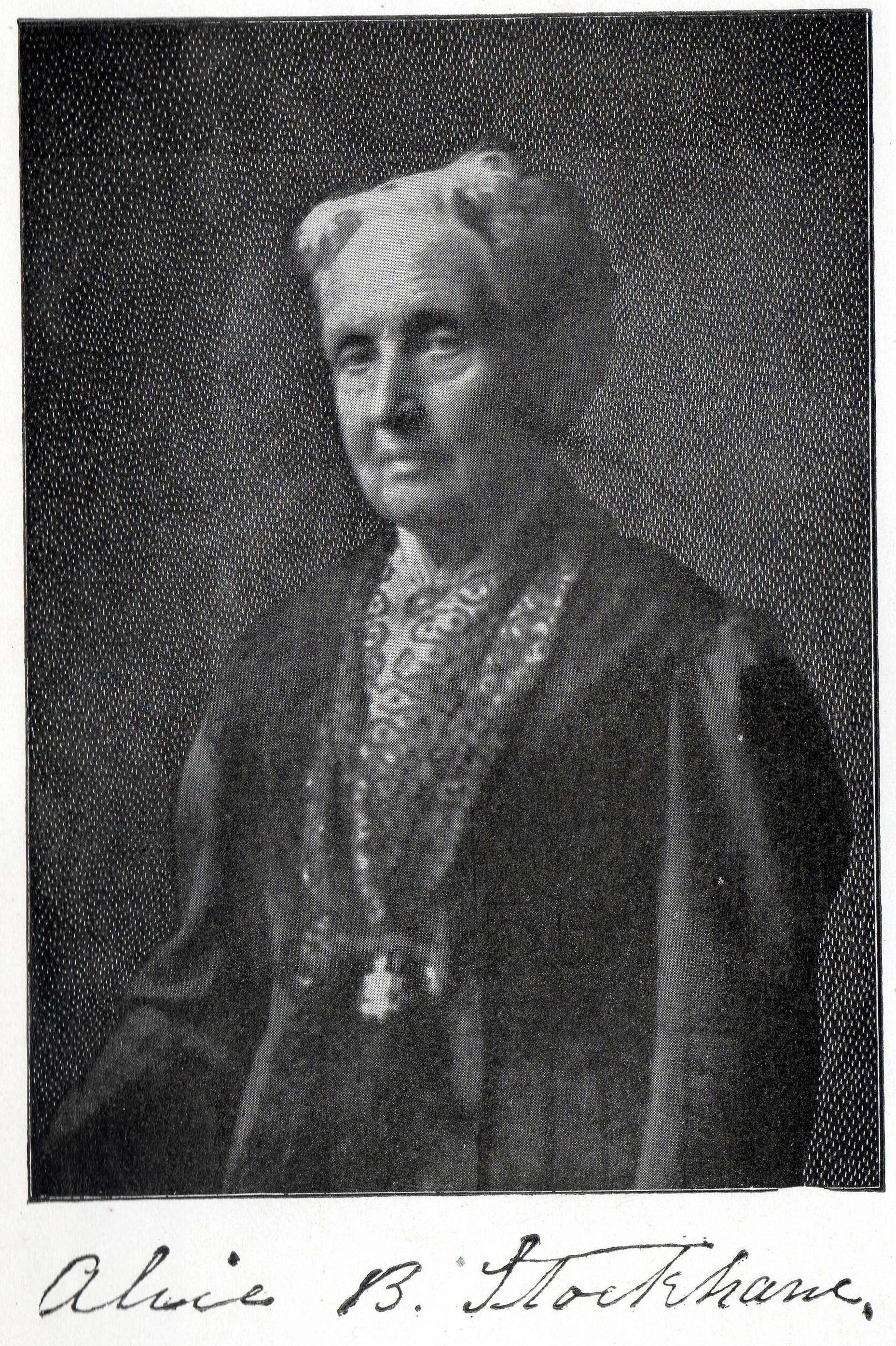
- Born: November 8, 1833; Cardington, Ohio, U.S.
- Died: December 3, 1912 (aged 79); Alhambra, California, U.S.
- Occupations: Obstetrician, writer, activist

Alice Bunker Stockham (November 8, 1833 – December 3, 1912) was an American obstetrician and gynecologist who was the fifth woman to become a doctor in the United States. She promoted gender equality, dress reform, birth control, and male and female sexual fulfillment for successful marriages.

Leo Tolstoy and Havelock Ellis were among her friends. She visited Sweden and from her trips to schools there she brought back the idea of teaching children domestic crafts, establishing shop and home economics classes in the United States.

Her children were William Henry Stockham (1861–1923) founder of Stockham Valve and Fittings Inc. and Cora L. Stockham (1857–?)

== Activism ==
Stockham was born in Cardington, Ohio, on November 8, 1833, and received her MD from the Chicago Homeopathic Medical College in 1892.

She lectured against the use of corsets by women, advocated complete abstinence from alcohol and tobacco, and believed in women's rights. Stockham was a vegetarian. In 1893, she was a speaker at the Third International Vegetarian Congress in Chicago.

Stockham was concerned with the economic plight of divorced women with children and prostitutes who wanted to get off the street. She felt these women had no marketable skills and would be unable to support themselves, so she had copies of her book Tokology, a layperson's guide to gynecology and midwifery, privately printed and gave them to "unfortunate women" to sell door-to-door in Chicago. Each copy came with a bound-in certificate signed by Stockham, entitling the bearer to a free gynecological exam.

In 1905, a then 72-year old Stockham and her publisher were convicted of circulating improper literature under the Comstock laws.

She died at her home in Alhambra, California on December 3, 1912.

== Karezza ==
She coined the term Karezza (from the Italian for "caress") and authored a book by this name in 1896. It refers to non-religious spiritual sexual practices that draw upon tantric techniques of body control but do not involve any of tantra's cultural or iconographic symbolism.

She promoted Karezza as a means to achieve:

1. birth control (she was against abortion but she wanted women to be able to control pregnancies);
2. social and political equality for women (she felt that "Karezza men" would never rape their wives and would actually treat them "decently");
3. marital pleasure and hence marital fidelity (she advocated Karezza as a cure for "failing marriages").

Stockham's interest in birth control could not overcome her fear that a mechanical sperm barrier would prevent "the complete interchange of magnetism" (a theory popular among 19th century sexual-spiritual teachers). In part this stems from the biblical injunction against Onanism, but she also felt a failure of magnetic interchange was injurious and unnatural.

Thus she advocated "the Oneida method" (from the Oneida Society), then also known as "male continence", in which men refrained from ejaculation but women were encouraged to have contractive orgasms at will. In later writings she also began to promulgate the need for women to learn to control their orgasm responses in the same way that the men of Oneida did. Ultimately, Stockham rejected the "male continence" techniques of John Humphrey Noyes in favour of gender parity in orgasm control. She also rejected Noyes' polyamorous ideas and promoted Karezza as a way to strengthen marriage and monogamy.

Stockham's gender-parity version of tantra yoga, despite its somewhat anti-orgasmic, and thus apparently anti-hedonistic bent, serves as an important counterpoint to the male-centered aspects of traditional tantric sexual practices and later variants such as the "sex-magick" of Aleister Crowley. In the field of sex magic, the only practice that is similar to Karezza as far as the sex act is concerned is Samael Aun Weor's The Perfect Matrimony; otherwise, they diverge as far as doctrine is concerned. She saw Karezza as a way to promote health and happiness in marriage. The emphasis was on selflessness in lovemaking, gentle, harmonious passion leading to sublime spiritual delights.

Despite the many benefits of Stockham's approach, including granting couples the ability to choose opportunities for parenthood without contraceptives, the Vatican did not like Karezza or its relatives. Forty years after Stockham's death in 1912, the Sacred Congregation of the Holy Office issued a moratorium, citing an express mandate of Pope Pius XII. It noted that several contemporary writers, in discussing married life, had described, praised, and even ventured to recommend something they termed "a reserved embrace", and forbade priests and spiritual directors ever to suggest that there was otherwise. On October 29, 1951 in his "allocution to midwives", Pope Pius XII citing Pope Pius XI's Encyclical Casti connubii of December 31, 1930 declared

[...] that every attempt of either husband or wife in the performance of the conjugal act or in the development of its natural consequences which aims at depriving it of its inherent force and hinders the procreation of new life is immoral; and that no "indication" or need can convert an act which is intrinsically immoral into a moral and lawful one.

This precept is in full force today, as it was in the past, and so it will be in the future also, and always, because it is not a simple human whim, but the expression of a natural and divine law.

== Works ==
- Parenthood. New York: R.F. Fenno & Co. OCLC 48382282.
- Tokology: a book for every woman. Toronto: McClelland & Goodchild. 2010 [1893]. ISBN 9781171559290. OCLC 70584238.
- Koradine letters: a girl's own book. Chicago: A.B. Stockham & Co. 1893. hdl:2027/uc1.31175034571243. OCLC 879560618.
- Health germs. Chicago: Alice B. Stockham & Co. 1895. OCLC 40124036.
- Karezza, Ethics of Marriage. New York: R.F. Fenno and Co. 1896. OCLC 868004523. Also available as Stockham, Alice (2017). Karezza Ethics of Marriage. Norderstedt: Books on Demand. ISBN 9783744815086. OCLC 987572577.
- Boy lover, and other essays. Chicago: Stockham Pub. Co. 1898. OCLC 651832268.
- Tolstoi: A Man of Peace. Chicago: A.B. Stockham & Co. 1900. hdl:2027/nyp.33433074344072. OCLC 656318043.
- The Lover's World: A Wheel of Life. Chicago: Stockham Pub. Co. 1903. OCLC 316566683. Also available as Stockham, Alice (2019). The Lover's World: A Wheel of Life. Norderstedt: Books on Demand. ISBN 9783744815086. OCLC 987572577
- Creative life: A Special Letter to Young Girls. Chicago: Progress Co. 2015 [1893/1904]. hdl:2027/uc2.ark:/13960/t58c9ts8z. ISBN 9781331329589. OCLC 681897566.
- Baby-Craft or Just What do Do for the Baby. Chicago: Stockham Pub. Co. 1906. OCLC 795778621.

== Sources ==
- Versluis, Arthur (2008). "American Sexual Mysticism, Alice Bunker Stockham". The secret history of western sexual mysticism: sacred practices and spiritual marriage. Rochester, Vt.: Destiny Books. ISBN 9781594779862. OCLC 667105138.
