= Sherburne Hopkins =

American Lawyer

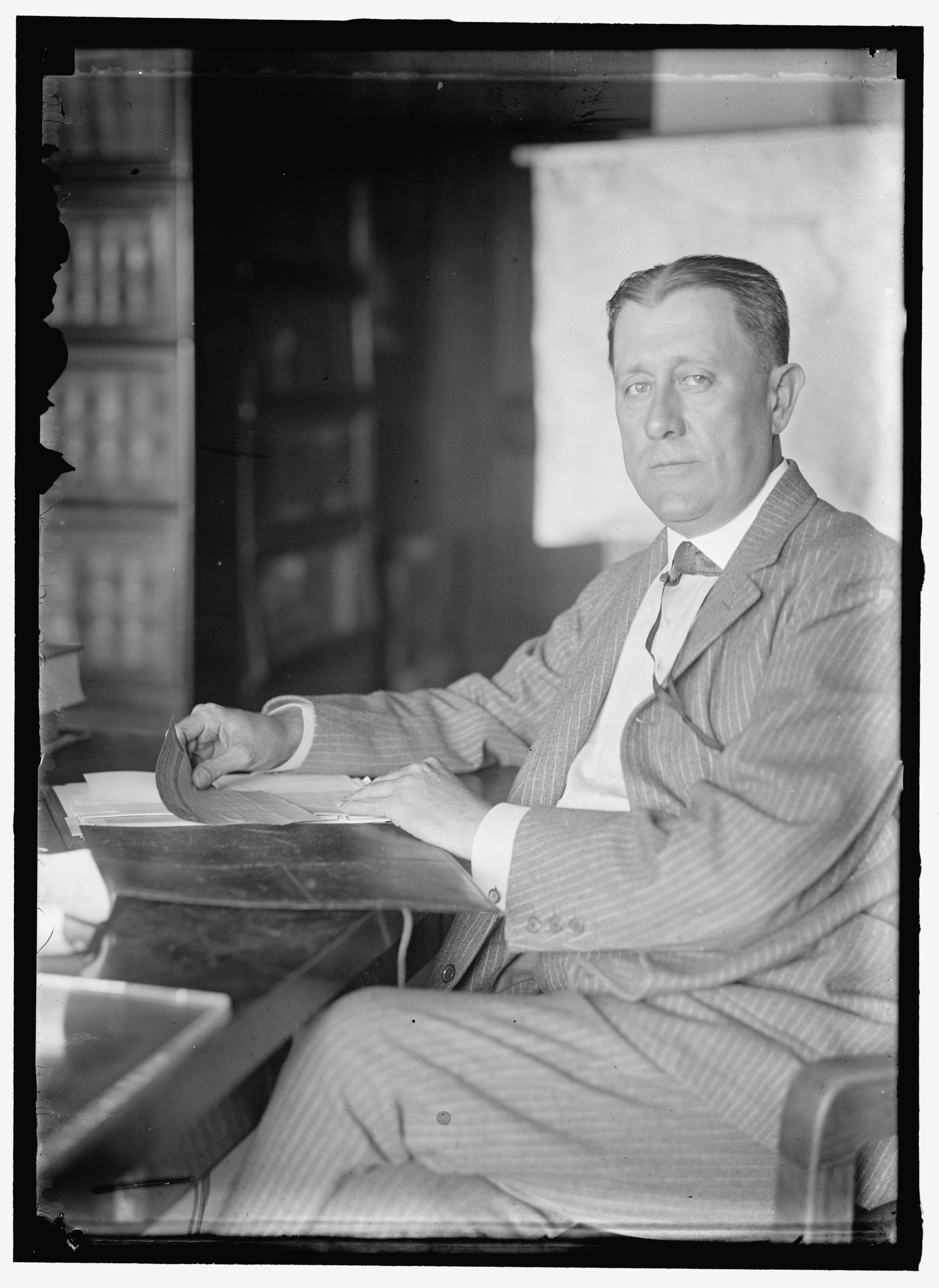

Sherburne Gillette Hopkins (October 5, 1867 – June 22, 1932) was an American lawyer and influential lobbyist in Washington, D.C. His clients included oil tycoon Henry Clay Pierce, financier and "father of trusts" Charles Ranlett Flint, Guatemalan President Manuel Estrada Cabrera, and Mexican President Francisco I. Madero among others. He specialized in connecting American finance with Latin American revolutionaries. "According to Who's Was Who in America, Hopkins specialized in international matters and settlements with the government adviser to several Latin American Governments; adviser to provisional government of Mexico (Madero), 1911; constitutionalist government of Mexico, 1913–14; to provision government of Mexico (de la Huerta), 1920." The most revealing source for Hopkins's activities is his testimony before the U.S. Senate Foreign Affairs Committee.

== Family background and upbringing ==
Born on October 5, 1867, in Washington D.C., he and his sister Jessie (born in 1876) could trace their roots to England. Hopkins' father, Thomas Snell Hopkins, had moved to Washington in the 1860s from Maine where the family homestead remains. Sherburne's ancestor Stephen Hopkins (1583–1644) came to Plymouth, Massachusetts on the Mayflower. Samuel Sherburne, his great grandfather, fought for American independence as a lieutenant in the New Hampshire Militia. Sherburne Hopkins' mother was Caroline Eastman whose family came from England to Massachusetts on the Confidence in 1638. Both sides of Hopkins' family tree count among the oldest families in U.S. history.

Hopkins attended school in Washington, D.C., and then the United States Naval Academy in Annapolis. He graduated with a degree in international law from Columbia University in 1890 and joined his father's practice.

While establishing himself as a lawyer in his father's practice, Hopkins married Hester Davis in 1891, with whom he had two children, Sherburne Philbrick on December 3, 1891, and Marjorie on August 5, 1894. Their son, Sherburne, later also a lawyer in the family firm, briefly became a social star when he married Margaret Upton, better known as Peggy Hopkins Joyce, a famous stage actress. The law firm now called Hopkins and Hopkins became one of the top lobbying firms for Wall Street in Washington.

== Early legal career ==
One of their largest clients was the "King of Trusts," Charles Ranlett Flint. In 1892, Flint, also from an old Massachusetts family, had merged several rubber companies to form the monopolistic conglomerate United States Rubber Company. His principal lawyer for this merger was Thomas Snell Hopkins. In another famous merger, Flint organized the main bubblegum manufacturers into American Chicle Company in 1899. In 1911, Flint founded the Computing-Tabulating-Recording Company, which later became IBM. His rubber business necessitated large investments in Latin America, Africa, and India. Flint especially had large real estate interests in southern Mexico. He joined with Henry Clay Pierce to become one of the largest investors in Mexican railways and international shipping companies such as the Pierce Forwarding Company of New Orleans. Pierce had purchased a majority share in the National Railroad of Mexico in 1903. In Mexico, one of Flint's competitors in the rubber industry was Evaristo Madero, the grandfather of future Mexican president Francisco I. Madero. The Maderos had dealings with Flint in the very beginning of the Mexican Revolution, which rightfully prompted historians to suspect Flint's financing of the upheaval. Flint also held large interests in Pierce's endeavors helping the oil magnate stay clear of hated rival John D. Rockefeller who owned the Standard Oil Company. "To the question whether Capt. Sherburne G. Hopkins of Washington had represented him [Pierce] in negotiations with Carranza he declined to answer, though he said that the law firm of Hopkins and Hopkins had looked after his interests in Washington for the last twenty-five years. His acquaintance with Capt. Hopkins is slight, but his father, Thomas S. Hopkins, has long been his attorney in Washington." Thomas Hopkins and his son Sherburne provided the legal work for Pierce and Flint. On January 3, 1900, the St. Louis Republic reported that Hopkins and Hopkins negotiated with the U.S. State Department on behalf of Flint. The British had confiscated several loads of flour off the coast of what is today Mozambique. The illegally seized freight had belonged to Flint's shipping concern. In the effort to force the British to release the cargo Hopkins had strong support from the State Department as well as from the German Foreign Office. In addition to Flint's flour, British warships had impounded a German mail steamer bound for home. The flour cargo spoiled, but Britain had to reimburse Flint for the damages.

== Military service ==
In 1898, Sherburne Hopkins joined the active navy in the Spanish–American War. It is unlikely that Hopkins saw much action. As the commander of the District of Columbia Naval Militia, Hopkins seemed to have stayed put while Admiral George Dewey defeated the Spanish on the other side of the world. Hopkins' name is mentioned in a newspaper article in October 1898, when he took command of the USS Fern, a twenty-five-year-old tugboat. However, rather than being dispatched to the war zone, Hopkins' task was to "bring the Fern to Washington." His rank is given as lieutenant. According to his own testimony to the U.S. Senate in 1912, Hopkins' responsibility "was …in the purchase of some materials of war for our own Government…" Through the years of his service in the naval reserves, Hopkins in fact had risen to the rank of lieutenant commander. When in the fall of 1899 Admiral Dewey returned to the United States a hero, Hopkins found mention in the official program of Dewey's Washington, D.C., rally as "Naval Battalion, Lieut. Commander Sherburne G. Hopkins, Commanding." His nickname among military peers was Sherby. Raised to the rank of Commander, Sherby remained in charge of the Washington, D.C. Naval Militia through 1904. Through his responsibilities as commander both professionally and socially Hopkins came to know the senior military establishment of Washington intricately.

== Lobbying work in Central America ==
The law firm showed its unparalleled manipulative might when it single-handedly shaped Central American history in the following years. After a skirmish between Honduras and Guatemala in 1906, the two countries and El Salvador had concluded the so-called friendship pact that isolated Nicaragua. In the spring of 1907 Nicaragua invaded Honduras in an attempt to unseat President Manuel Bonilla, a puppet of United Fruit Company. With the help of U.S. marines the Honduran leader survived. Virtually a protectorate of the United States with marines occupying Bluefields on the Atlantic side of the country, Nicaragua invaded Honduras in 1908 to install a new, less hostile government there. Despite the official support for intervention of the U.S. government, Hopkins and his international clients worked behind the scenes to contain the Nicaraguan Dictator José Santos Zelaya. The weapon of choice was to provide money for neighboring countries such as Honduras and Guatemala while denying finance to Zelaya. After years of effort, Nicaragua had finally concluded a loan for 1.25 million pounds Sterling (over $100 Million in today's value) from the Ethelburg Syndicate in London in 1909. Hopkins and Hopkins signed Ethelburg as their client and promptly succeeded in canceling the loan. Apparently, Hopkins leaked crucial information on the impending U.S. intervention to unseat Zelaya to Otto Fuerth, a director of Ethelburg. The loan was cancelled and Zelaya gave up before the Marines landed. Hopkins testified in 1920: "I imparted the information to a friend of mine named Otto Fuerth, whom I had known for a number of years and who had vital interests in that Republic, and I did not want to see him make a loss, and I gave him a little quiet information." While Hopkins and his clients worked with the American government to unseat Zelaya, American mercenaries, the likes of Sam Dreben, Tracy Richardson, Tex O'Reilly, and Emil Lewis Holmdahl, together with forces from Guatemala and Honduras attacked Nicaragua full scale. Everyone expected an imminent invasion of the country by U.S. forces. As Hopkins managed to cancel the loan and American mercenaries began attacking the capital of Managua, the Nicaraguan dictator left.

Hopkins' involvement in the Nicaraguan change of government was critical. He represented his clients and acted on behalf of the U.S. government, especially Philander Knox who had become Secretary of State in 1909. Hopkins also supported Knox's efforts to properly finance and equip the rebel forces. Guatemalan President and another puppet of the United Fruit Company, Manuel Estrada Cabrera, received funds from the United States, mainly in the form of loans. The banana fleets of United Fruit and Pierce transported weapons and ammunition to the Central American republics. The main U.S. port from where tramp steamers sailed was New Orleans, a hot bed for mercenaries, revolutionaries, and intrigue of all kind. After Zelaya fled, the U.S. government installed a new puppet regime. "I knew exactly what was going to happen. I knew that nothing could save Zelaya," Hopkins boasted to Senator Smith in 1912. Upon the question of whether Hopkins' intimate information about Nicaragua's troubles came from sources in the government, he replied: "I should not say directly from our Government, Senator. I knew what was going to happen before our Government did, and stopped Zelaya's loan from going through. I am also free to say that I received a great many hints that things were going to happen. I knew the sentiment in the State Department and elsewhere …"

== Connection to Francisco I. Madero and the Mexican Revolution ==
Hopkins' obvious success and experience in Central America in the decade prior to the Mexican Revolution made him the prime candidate to orchestrate a successful uprising for Francisco I. Madero and American high finance. On the one hand, American investors, especially Hopkins' client Henry Clay Pierce, wanted to unseat British oil tycoon Weetman Pearson, 1st Viscount Cowdray and his Científico puppets. On the other hand, the Maderistas needed finance and political support from the highest echelons of the U.S. government. Hopkins's task was to bring these interests together. According to Hopkins Francisco I. Madero's brother, Gustavo A. Madero, and his father Francisco Madero Sr., met with him sometime in October 1910 in the Hotel Astor in New York. They made a deal. Hopkins received a retainer of $50,000 (over $1 million in today's money) payable upon successful completion of Diaz' overthrow. Since that day in New York, according to Hopkins, he had been in "almost daily" contact with Madero's brother, preparing the revolution. What exactly this responsibility entailed, Hopkins did not elaborate on. Clearly, there were only three areas in which work was required: Procuring loans to finance arms and ammunition purchases; building an organization for the revolutionaries that procured and shipped arms and ammunition; and creating political support in the United States for the rebellion. Showing how much his connections were worth, Hopkins successfully interceded with his friend, Secretary of State Philander Knox, to allow munitions to pass unchallenged from El Paso to Ciudad Juárez to aid revolutionaries.

Once the Maderos apparently put the well-connected lawyer in charge of the U.S. representation of their efforts, Hopkins had to find personnel quickly. The success of Madero's uprising depended on immediate financing, munitions shipments, and political support in Washington. Historians emphasize Madero's efforts to democratize Mexico and to institute meaningful social reforms, but often do not mention the Madero connection to U.S. interests. There is no hard evidence to suggest that the Maderos did anything other than what they could to advance their own goals. Henry Clay Pierce thought that as president Madero would create a more favorable political environment for his corporate interests than Díaz, so that he supported him. Even without any additional concessions, Pierce and the other U.S. magnates were not idealists. They faced an increasingly impossible work environment under Díaz, since, at the very least, in 1910 at 80 years old Díaz would likely not last much longer in office and the presidential succession was unclear. When Senator Gilbert Hitchcock asked Hopkins whether his engagement in Mexico was for "any idealistic purpose," the answer defined the reality: "Of course not altogether, Senator."

== American intelligence involvement ==
A representative of the Maderos and other governments, representing at the same time the Flint and Pierce interests, Hopkins also worked as an informant for the Military Intelligence Division of the US Army. However, the M.I.D. did not entirely trust him. When Hopkins determined that intelligence could be given without hurting the interests of his clients, it was reliable and valuable. Otherwise, he would not impart intelligence to the American government. His contacts in the M.I.D. hierarchy are also interesting. Not a single document could be found where Hopkins corresponded with Colonel Van Deman, the de facto head of the M.I.D. for many years. Hopkins corresponded with people much higher up in the chain of command, usually with the Secretary of War and his Chiefs of Staff. As a result, it appears more often than not that lower tier staff did not know him. From the evaluations of his M.I.D. handlers it becomes clear that they recognized the essence of his value. Informed like no one else, Hopkins had to be handled with one caveat aptly defined in 1920 by Major Montague of the Military Intelligence Division. "His loyalty shifts with his fee," he cautioned his superiors.

== Connection to Venustiano Carranza and the Mexican Revolution ==
On Sunday, June 28, 1914, an exposé with wide-ranging consequences exploded on the first page of the New York Herald. A break-in of Hopkins' office in Washington, D.C., netted burglars correspondence between the Hopkins' firm, the U.S. government, and the leader of the Constitutionalist forces, led by Venustiano Carranza. The details of the scandal were so significant that the details competed for first page headlines with the assassination of the Archduke Franz Ferdinand of Austria and his wife on the same day. The scandal had its origin just around the beginning of May, the time when Felix A. Sommerfeld and Hopkins shuttled between New York and Washington, trying to sideline Carranza, and arranging the finance for the final push against President Huerta. According to Sherburne Hopkins, burglars entered his Washington, D.C., offices at the Hibbs building on 725 15th Street, NW in the middle of the night and "stole a mass of correspondence from his desk." He suspected the burglars to be "Científicos," people who wanted to turn the clock back to Porfirio Díaz ' times. Hopkins denied knowing who in particular was to blame for the heist, but "had certain parties under suspicion." Clearly, he was implicating Huerta agents in the crime. Despite the break-in and removal of not a few but hundreds of files from his office, Hopkins did not file a police report.

Hundreds of letters between Hopkins, Carranza, Flint, and Pierce told a story of foreign interests using the Constitutionalists for their own ends. The letters seemed to indicate that the whole revolution had become a competition between Lord Cowdray and Henry Clay Pierce. The Hopkins papers revealed the extent to which American investors fronted by Pierce and Flint had been involved in the Mexican Revolution. Not much of the overall story should have been a surprise. For years American newspapers had reported on the financial dealings of the Maderos with Wall Street. When after President Madero's murder the rest of the family fled to the U.S., their support for Carranza was public knowledge. However, what made the Hopkins papers so combustible was the undeniable link between major parts of the U.S. government, oil and railroad interests headed by Flint and Pierce, and certain factions within the Constitutionalists headed by Carranza and Pancho Villa. The appearance of impropriety was undeniable. As late as April 1914, President Wilson's special envoy to Mexico, John Lind, negotiated with Hopkins and Carranza with regards to the Niagara Falls peace conference, convened to negotiate the U.S. exit from Mexico.

The exposé suggested also a second, less favorable picture of the Carranza government. The mere fact of Carranza corresponding freely with Hopkins and Pierce seemed to suggest that Carranza was willing to sell Mexico's infrastructure and natural resources to American finance if they helped him win the revolution. In a sense, these revelations threatened to reduce Carranza to the level of Porfirio Díaz whose sell-out had precipitated the revolution. Carranza would not let this stand and quickly issued a categorical denial of his government ever having accepted any financing from U.S. interests. Hopkins, Pierce, Flint, Carranza, Luis Cabrera Lobato, José Vasconcelos, Lind, Lindley Miller Garrison, and William Jennings Bryan all voiced public denials of ever having known anyone or dealt with anyone of the group. Only two parties smiled through the show: Senators Smith and Fall who loved to see the Wilson administration tumble, and Huerta's representatives in Niagara who only had to gain from the revelations.

As the Republican Senators William Alden Smith and Albert Bacon Fall correctly assumed, Hopkins had driven a deep wedge of suspicion between President Wilson and his Secretaries William Jennings Bryan and Lindley Miller Garrison. The latter even publicly announced that he never met or dealt with Hopkins, which clearly was untrue. Both cabinet members surreptitiously relented on the arms embargo against Mexico, while publicly proclaiming its enforcement.

== End of Hopkins' power and influence ==
The Carranza scandal devastated Hopkins' public image. He remained a solid soldier for the interests of Pierce and Flint, however, further in the background. His political clout had been on decline throughout the spring of 1914 and finally ended with the exposé of his stolen papers on June 28. In a larger sense, the Hopkins papers confirmed to the American public and international observers alike just how deep the machinations of American finance reached into U.S. foreign policy and Mexican affairs. Suddenly, all the rumors and suspicions voiced for years in newspapers and Senate investigations lay on public display as fact. Hopkins' carefully crafted lobbying schemes, his financing of select revolutionary factions in Mexico, the pushing of his clients' interests while hurting their competitors, and his intricate network of whole layers of government that operated on a system of favors – all of it had broken to pieces. After the scandal, Hopkins remained in the background. His protégé Felix A. Sommerfeld took the public stage. Throughout the coming world war, Hopkins gave information to the American government when asked. Off and on between 1914 and 1918, he acted as an informant and filed reports with the U.S. Military Intelligence Division. His influence on the Mexican Revolution never reached the heights of 1913 and 1914. When Pancho Villa self-destructed on the battlefield a year later, Hopkins had already faded into the background. He supported Villa's resurgence a few years later and supported the rise of Adolfo de la Huerta in the 1920s. When Hopkins died on June 22, 1932, The New York Times ran an obituary of the Washington lawyer who had revolutionary chieftains move at his behest like marionettes. Despite the anticlimactic ending, Hopkins' influence of American foreign policy towards Latin America and his influence on the Mexican Revolution are profound. As an MID agent remarked after World War I, "Hopkins has forgotten more about Mexico than any other American will ever learn."
