= Felix A. Sommerfeld =

German spy

Felix A. Sommerfeld (May 28, 1879 – ?) was a German secret service agent in Mexico and the United States between 1908 and 1919. He was chief of the Mexican secret service under President Francisco I. Madero, worked as a diplomat and arms buyer for Venustiano Carranza and Francisco "Pancho" Villa, and ran the Mexican portion of Germany's war strategy in North America between 1914 and 1917.

== Biography ==
Born on May 28, 1879, in Schneidemühl, in the Prussian Province of Posen, Germany, Sommerfeld grew up in a middle class Jewish household as the youngest son of Pauline and Isidor Sommerfeld. After finishing high school Sommerfeld began studies in Berlin as a mining engineer. However, for unknown reasons he dropped out and came to the United States in 1898 to visit his brother. In the excitement over the outbreak of the Spanish–American War, the 19-year-old joined the army but deserted a few months after. In 1900 Sommerfeld, this time as a German soldier, went to war in China to put down the Boxer Rebellion. He was a "Meldereiter," German for horse messenger. When he returned in 1901 he completed his mining engineering studies and returned to the United States in 1902. After briefly staying with his brother Julius in Chicago, Sommerfeld set out to the West as a prospector. He worked his way through Arizona, Sonora (Mexico) and Durango (Mexico) until 1905 when he returned to Chicago totally broke. Not much is known about the German adventurer between 1906 and 1908. It is possible that he returned to Germany and received secret service training in Berlin.

In 1908, he suddenly showed up in Chihuahua, Mexico. He again worked as a mining engineer, however, in reality he became an informant for the German government. Chihuahua was ripe with rebellion and Sommerfeld did all he could to find out as much as possible about the anti-reelection movement led by wealthy Coahuila landowner, Francisco I. Madero. After the fraudulent elections that brought Porfirio Díaz yet another term as president in 1910, the Mexican Revolution erupted. Sommerfeld ostensibly worked for AP News but filed regular intelligence reports for the German government.

When forces supporting Madero succeeded in overthrowing the Díaz in May 1911, Sommerfeld joined the new president's entourage, first as a personal assistant, then as Mexico's chief of the secret service. Working under the direction of the president's brother, Gustavo A. Madero, Sommerfeld led the Mexican secret service. He helped put down the Orozco uprising in the spring of 1912, in the course of which he led the largest foreign secret service organization ever operating on U.S. soil. The secret service organization Sommerfeld built included Mexican-Americans, Mexican expatriates, other German agents such as Horst von der Goltz and Arnold Krumm-Heller, as well as two of the most notorious soldiers of fortune of the decade, Sam Dreben and Emil Lewis Holmdahl.

In 1913, after Madero's overthrow and murder by Victoriano Huerta, Sommerfeld left Mexico under the protection of German ambassador Paul von Hintze, went to Washington, D.C., where he received funds from lawyer and Madero supporter Sherburne Hopkins and signed up with the rebel movement assembled to overthrow Huerta. Governor of Coahuila, Venustiano Carranza, who declared against Huerta's regime and created the Constitutionalist revolutionary movement against it, sent Sommerfeld to El Paso and San Antonio to organize weapons for the revolutionaries. Access to arms was a key element of a successful military movement. Northern Mexico's access to the border made procuring arms easier than in southern Mexico, where the Zapatistas operated. Sommerfeld also functioned as a liaison between the U.S. government and Carranza.

In the spring of 1914, Sommerfeld began working closer with successful Constitutionalist Army General, Pancho Villa, commander of the División del Norte. When Villa and Carranza split their alliance after the defeat of Huerta in July 1914 and a civil war of the winners ensued, Sommerfeld stayed with Villa as his chief weapons buyer in the U.S. Sommerfeld also lobbied the U.S. government on Villa's behalf to receive diplomatic recognition. The task brought Sommerfeld close to General Hugh Lenox Scott and American Secretary of War, Lindley Miller Garrison, both of whom he assisted numerous times when U.S. nationals found themselves in trouble in Mexico. Sommerfeld was questioned following the mysterious disappearance of prominent writer Ambrose Bierce, who had attached himself to Villa's forces but then vanished without a trace.

When World War I broke out in August 1914, Sommerfeld moved to New York ostensibly to represent Pancho Villa's interests but actually worked for German Naval Attache Karl Boy-Ed. In his function as a specialist on Mexican affairs, Sommerfeld helped the German government sell arms and ammunition they had bought to keep them out of enemy Entente hands. Sommerfeld also had great knowledge of U.S. munitions factories, their capacities, order status, etc. His intelligence reports had a great influence on the formulation of Germany's war strategy vis-a-vis the United States. In 1915, Sommerfeld funneled large numbers of arms to Pancho Villa, the value being estimated to about $340,000 (About $7 million in today's value). Despite having large numbers of arms, Villa was decisively defeated by Constitutionalist Army General Álvaro Obregón in a series of battles in the Bajio, the most famous of which is the Battle of Celaya in 1915. Villa's huge army of movement, largely using massed cavalry charges, fell before Obregón's superior strategy and tactics of trenches improvised from agricultural irrigation ditches and machine guns. Villa's División del Norte ceased to exist, and Villa became a guerrilla leader rather than the general of a major army of movement.

In March 1916, Villa and a small group of men attacked the city of Columbus, NM. The Battle of Columbus resulted in civilian casualties and prompted the U.S., to send General John J. Pershing on a Punitive Mission, which was unsuccessful in its attempt to capture Villa. Sommerfeld, who had proposed to the German government in May 1915 that he could create an incident which would provoke a war between the U.S. and Mexico, became a prime suspect in Villa's attack on Columbus. However, no investigator or historian has been able to prove Sommerfeld's involvement.

In June 1918, Sommerfeld was interned in Fort Oglethorpe, GA as an enemy alien. He was released in 1919. A few trips back and forth to Mexico have been recorded in the 1920s and 30s. However, the German agent disappeared in the 1930s, though he does show up in 1942 at age 63 residing at 117 West 17th Street in New York City, after which his whereabouts remain unknown.
