= Eroto-comatose lucidity =

Sex magic technique

Eroto-comatose lucidity is a technique of sex magic known best by its formulation by English author and occultist Aleister Crowley in 1912, but which has several variations and is used in a number of ways by different spiritual communities. A common form of the ritual uses repeated sexual stimulation (but not to physical orgasm) to place the individual in a state between full sleep and full wakefulness as well as exhaustion, allowing the practitioner to commune with their god.

== History ==
The ritual was first documented by Aleister Crowley. However, Crowley may not have been the originator of the rite, and may have learned about it from a female student first.

Crowley wrote in his work De Arte Magica that eroto-comatose lucidity is also called the "sleep of Siloam" and Newcomb notes that this rite preceded Crowley. He points out that Paschal Beverly Randolph ("arguably the single most important figure in the rise of modern sexual magic") called this ritualistic state the "sleep of Sialam." Randolph first discussed the "sleep of Sialam" in his 1873 work Ravalette, but described it at the time as a once-in-a-century prophetic trance. In later writings, Randolph used the term as a more general form of clairvoyant sleep used to understand spiritual things.

Helena Blavatsky may also have taught the technique, calling it the "Sleep of Siloam." In her 1877 work Isis Unveiled, Blavatsky wrote that the trance must be induced through drugs rather than sexual exhaustion. Later, Blavatsky altered her understanding of the rite to mean that drug-induced trance-like state in which a new initiate first comprehends spiritual things. This was described in Blavatsky's 1888 work Secret Doctrine, and she taught that the ritualistic state allowed the individual to either commune with the gods, descend into hell, or perform spiritual acts. Blavatsky taught this was a deep sleep, but Newcomb notes that modern ritualists do not enter sleep but rather a state between sleep and wakefulness.

Sexual practices used for spiritual purposes are not new. Eastern traditions within Taoism and tantrism also incorporated sexual rituals.

== Process ==
Crowley first described the rite in a tract titled Eroto-Comatose Lucidity. The ritual as described by Crowley involves one "ritualist-seer" and several aides. Donald Michael Kraig advises that the more sexually experienced the aides are, the better the ritual works, and that the aides be members of the opposite sex. Religious scholar Hugh Urban, however, concludes that, for Crowley, aides of the same gender as the ritualist (e.g., homosexual activity) was the highest stage of practice of this ritual.

In the first part of the ritual, the aides repeatedly seek to both arouse sexually and exhaust the ritualist. The ritualist is generally passive in this regard. There is disagreement over whether sexual arousal is enough, or sexual orgasm must be eventually accomplished. Crowley and others argue that orgasm must be avoided. Although later practitioners conclude that orgasm does not need to be avoided, that was how Crowley originally formulated the ritual. Most practitioners agree with Crowley that every means of arousal may be used, such as physical stimulation, genital stimulation, psychological stimulation, devices (such as sex toys), or drugs (an entheogen like hashish, marijuana, or other aphrodisiacs). There should be enough aides so that if one aide tires another may take their place. Eventually, the ritualist will tend to sink into sleep due to exhaustion.

In the second part of the ritual, the aides seek to come close to awakening the ritualist through sexual stimulation alone. The goal is not to fully awaken them but rather to bring them to the brink of wakefulness. Not all authors agree that the ritualist seer will be in a state between sleep and wakefulness, instead asserting that exhaustion will lead to a trance, or "sleep of lucidity". The ritualist should be neither too tired nor too uncomfortable to aid in the trance-like state.

Once the ritualist reaches a near-waking state, sexual stimulation must stop. The ritualist-seer is then permitted to sink back toward (but not into) sleep. This step is repeated indefinitely until the ritualist reaches a state between sleep and wakefulness in which communing with a higher power may occur. Some say a goal during this time is to not become "lost" in the trance-like state, but to remain open without directing an outcome. The ritualist may also conduct spiritual work while in this state, or witness mystical events. Exhaustion may not be necessary for the ritualist who is "bodily pure," Crowley writes.

=== Endings ===
The rite may end in one of two ways. The ritualist may simply sink into total sleep, or they may achieve orgasm and then sink into a deep and "undisturbable" sleep. Jason Newcomb, however, concludes that sexual exhaustion achieved through repeated orgasm may also lead to the ritualistic state and does not necessarily end the rite. Frater U. D., however, has argued that the orgasmic moment should not be lost and that the individual should strive to use the moment for spiritual or magical purposes.

Upon awakening, the ritualist seer could, for example, write down everything they had experienced, witnessed, or been told. At least one author concludes that what is desired should be focused on throughout the rite, and that the individual should not be distracted from it or free of desire.

Crowley also intended that when men do the ritual, any semen (or "elixir") produced by orgasm must be consumed by the ritualist, possibly in a Crowley inspired "Cake of Light".

== Similar rites ==
A similar rite of sexual exhaustion described by Crowley leads not to spiritual communing but a sort of vampirism. In this rite, the aides use only the mouth to sexually exhaust the ritualist, and the intent of the aides must not be to assist the ritualist but rather to transfer the ritualist's own magical strength to themselves. Crowley claimed that when the ritualist is pushed to the point of death from sexual exhaustion in this way, the ritualist's spirit is enslaved by the aides and their power transferred to the aides.

Michael W. Ford has argued for alternative rites as well. His concept of Luciferianism incorporates Crowley's ideas about sexual exhaustion, but concludes that the ritualist's will is what sends the spirit forth to bond with higher power. Ford argues for two methods of attaining sexual exhaustion and ascension: "Via Lilith" and "Via Cain." In the Lilith ritual, the room should be draped in crimson and black; music which inspires dark emotions, contains chanting, or contains horrific sounds should be played; and images of Lilith, Lilitu, and succubi should hang in the room. In the Cain ritual, both the room and ritualist should be adorned with fetishes of the Horned God and symbols of Cain, and Middle Eastern music should be played.

== In popular culture ==
The rite and other sex magic practices have had a limited, marginal influence. Crowley's concepts have been seized on by the bands Killing Joke and Psychic TV.

== See also ==
- Aleister Crowley bibliography
- Coitus reservatus
- Edging (sexual practice)
- Maithuna

== Bibliography ==
- Belanger, Michelle. Vampires in Their Own Words: An Anthology of Vampire Voices. St. Paul, Minn.: Llewellyn Worldwide, 2007. ISBN 0-7387-1220-5
- Carroll, Peter J. Liber Null & Psychonaut. Newburyport, Mass.: Red Wheel, 1987. ISBN 0-87728-639-6
- Deveney, John Patrick. Paschal Beverly Randolph: A Nineteenth-Century Black American Spiritualist, Sosicrucian, and Sex Magician. Albany, N.Y.: SUNY Press, 1997. ISBN 0-7914-3119-3
- Kraig, Donald Michael. Modern Sex Magick: Secrets of Erotic Spirituality. Woodbury, Minn.: Llewellyn Publications, 1988. ISBN 0-87542-324-8
- Martin, Stoddard. Art, Messianism and Crime: A Study of Antinomianism in Modern Literature and Lives. New York: Macmillan, 1986. ISBN 0-333-39496-8
- Martin, Stoddard. Orthodox Heresy: The Rise of "Magic" as Religion and Its Relation to Literature. New York: Macmillan, 1989. ISBN 0-333-43540-0
- Newcomb, Jason. Sexual Sorcery: A Complete Guide to Sex Magick. Newburyport, Mass.: Samuel Weiser, 2005. ISBN 1-57863-330-3
- Reynolds, Simon. The Sex Revolts: Gender, Rebellion, and Rock 'n' Roll. Reprint ed. Cambridge, Massachusetts: Harvard University Press, 1996. ISBN 0-674-80273-X
- Stone, Karl. "The Moonchild of Yesod: A Grimoire of Occult Hyperchemistry." (2012).
- Stone, Karl. "The Star of Hastur: Explorations in Hyperchemistry." (2015).
- U.D., Frater. Secrets of Western Sex Magic: Magical Energy and Gnostic Trance. 3d ed. St. Paul, Minn.: Llewellyn Worldwide, 2001. ISBN 1-56718-706-4
- Urban, Hugh D. Magia Sexualis: Sex, Magic, and Liberation in Modern Western Esotericism. Berkeley, Calif.: University of California Press, 2006. ISBN 0-520-24776-0
- Walker, Benjamin. Body Magic. Florence, Ky.: Taylor & Francis, 1979. ISBN 0-586-08323-5
- Walker, Benjamin. Encyclopedia of Esoteric Man. New York: Routledge & Kegan Paul, 1977. ISBN 0-7100-8479-X
