= Samael Aun Weor =

Colombian gnostic writer

Personal life
- Born: Víctor Manuel Gómez Rodríguez; March 6, 1917 Bogotá, Colombia
- Died: December 24, 1977 (aged 60) Mexico City, Mexico
- Spouse: Arnolda Garro de Gómez, V. M. Litelantes
- Parent(s): Manuel Gómez Quijano and Francisca Rodríguez
- Known for: Occultism, Theosophy, Esotericism and Universal Gnosticism
- Occupation: Religious leader

Religious life
- Religion: Gnosticism

Samael Aun Weor (Hebrew: סמאל און ואור; March 6, 1917 – December 24, 1977), born Víctor Manuel Gómez Rodríguez, was a Colombian-Mexican occultist and author of over sixty books of esoteric spirituality. He formed a new religious movement under the banner of "Universal Gnosticism", or simply gnosis, which scholars have described as the origin of multiple neo-gnostic sects across Latin America, and taught practical and esoteric principles purported to "awaken consciousness" and fundamentally change the practitioner's psychological condition.

He first gained a following in his native Colombia before moving to Mexico in 1956, where his movement grew and his works spread among practitioners of occultism and Western esotericism and were translated into other languages. Many of his teachings draw heavily on other esotericists, in particular Gurdjieff (via Ouspensky), without acknowledging them as sources.

His writings condemn homosexuality as a path to spiritual damnation and teach that orgasm is a loss of spiritual energy. In La Transformación Social de la Humanidad (1965) he advocated the sterilization of criminals to prevent the propagation of "bad-quality seed", and classified all races as "Aryan" except the Jews. After his death the movement split into numerous independent organizations, some of which have been described as sects (sectas) by the Spanish press, cult researchers and former members, and accused of psychological manipulation, sexual control, forced labour and human trafficking; the groups reject these characterizations and deny the allegations (see § Cult allegations).

In 1948, Gómez referred to himself as the name of his being, Aun Weor, which means "the verb or messenger of God." In 1954, after undergoing a ceremony he described as the birth of "Inner Christ," he adopted the name of Samael Aun Weor, which he used until his death in 1977. Samael Aun Weor referred to his teachings as "The Doctrine of Synthesis", claiming to express the existence of the "perennial philosophy, with its highest teleological function apparently being the accomplishment of "Christification" and "Final Liberation".

== Biography ==
=== Early life ===
Victor Manuel Gómez Rodriguez was born in Bogotá, Cundinamarca, Republic of Colombia, son of Manuel Gómez Quijano and Francisca Rodríguez de Gómez. He was baptized in the Roman Catholic Church, but later rejected the Church of Rome. His childhood and family life are not well known, except that he had a brother, and his father remarried after a divorce.

He was sent to a Roman Catholic Jesuit school but soon dropped out, disappointed by religion; he was twelve years old at the time. Instead he said he invested most of his time in the study of metaphysical and esoteric treatises. At the age of 17, he claimed that he was asked to lecture at the local Theosophical Chapter.

He stated that a year later was admitted into the occult society Fraternitas Rosicruciana Antiqua (F.R.A.). This was founded by Arnoldo Krumm-Heller, aka “Huiracocha”, a German intelligence agent in World War I, a racist, admirer of Hitler and anti-semite. He claimed that Krumm-Heller consecrated him as a bishop despite his young age, a claim “vehemently rejected by every F.R.A. group”, whilst certain of his followers even claimed that “Samael was the patriarch of the Gnostic Church and Krumm-Heller was the archbishop”.

=== Early adult life, marriages, and children ===
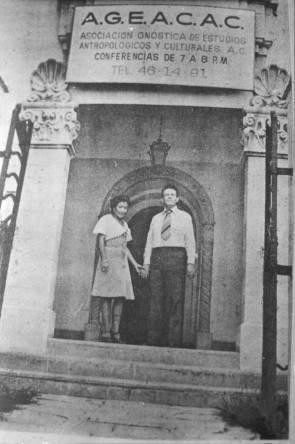
Litelantes and Samael Aun Weor

Few details of his life are known between the mid-1930s and 1950. He became a spiritual vagabond of sorts, traveling with neither home nor income. At one point he said he had lived with a tribe of indigenous people in the Sierra Nevada de Santa Marta in northern Colombia, and that they had taught him secrets of healing, which he claimed to have shared with the world in his work "Occult Medicine and Practical Magic".

It was also during these years that he described his first experience of what he labelled as the Illuminating Void where he claimed to have met his "Inner Being" or Atman whose name he said was "Aun Weor", meaning in Hebrew "Strength and Light".

He was briefly married to Sara Dueños and they had a son named "Imperator". However, in 1946, he met and married the "Lady-Adept" known as "Litelantes" or "Negrita" (born Arnolda Garro Mora) with whom he lived for 31 years and had four children: Osiris, Isis, Iris, and Hypatia, with his practise of "Scientific Chastity". Samael Aun Weor states that as soon as he met her, this "Lady-Adept" Genie began to instruct him in the Science of "Jinn State", which apparently involved placing the physical body in the fourth dimension. He claimed this was known as Nahuatlism in Aztec religion.

=== Career as an occult teacher and leader ===
By 1948 he had started teaching a small group of students. In 1950, under the name "Aun Weor", he managed to publish The Perfect Matrimony, or The Door to Enter into Initiation with the help of his close disciples. The book, later entitled The Perfect Matrimony, unveiled the purported secret of sexuality as the cornerstone of the world's great religions. In it he addressed topics such as sexual transmutation, "white tantra", and esoteric initiation.

According to his diary, writing about sex in such a candid manner was met with disdain by the majority of the public at the time. Seen as immoral and pornographic, Aun Weor found himself fleeing angry mobs attempting to silence him through violent means. From March 14 to 19 of 1952 Aun Weor spent five days in jail, allegedly for "committing the crime of healing the sick" (but it may in fact have been a charge of "quackery"). An account of his incarceration is recounted in a personal diary he later published as Secret Notes of a Guru.

After March 19, 1952, Aun Weor and some disciples built and lived near the Summum Supremum Sanctuarium, an "underground temple" in the Sierra Nevada de Santa Marta in Colombia. On October 27, 1954, Aun Weor claimed to have received what is referred to as the "Initiation of Tiphereth", which, according to his doctrine, is the beginning of the incarnation of the Logos or "Glorian" within the soul. He states that in his case the name of his Glorian has always been called "Samael" through the ages. From then on, he would sign his name Samael Aun Weor.

Aun Weor stated that this union of Samael (the Logos) with Aun Weor (the human soul) is the Maitreya Buddha Kalki Avatar of the New Age of Aquarius. Upon being asked exactly what such a title meant, he replied:

A messenger or avatar, in the most complete sense of the word, is a courier, a man who delivers a message, a servant or maid of the Great Work. So, the word avatar must not fall into misinterpretations, it must be specified with complete clarity. I am, therefore, a servant or crew member, or messenger who delivers a message. Some time ago I said that I am a cosmic mailman, since I am giving the content of a cosmic letter. Therefore, my beloved brethren, the word avatar must never lead us to arrogance, since it only means nothing other than an emissary, a servant, a crew member who gives a message, an epistle, and that is all.

He went on to say that term Maitreya does not refer to an individual, but to any being who has "Christified" themself. However he also stated that his specific "Inner Being" was the "Maitreya" or "Kalki Avatar" of the "Age of Aquarius". But although he would declare himself as the true Kalki Avatar many times throughout his works, he seemed to reject idolization:

I, Samael, am not in need of henchmen or followers, but only imitators of my doctrine: Gnosis. I do not follow anyone, nor do I want anyone to follow me. What I want is for each one of you to follow his own Self. I am only a lighthouse in the sea of existence, and I do not need clientele in order to subsist. Since I am against the slavery of souls, I do not want to enslave any soul, nor do I agree with executioners of ideals. Masters exist in abundance, and I am only one of many; thus, those who want to find the Masters will find them inside, within the profundities of their own inner consciousness.

=== Living in Mexico City ===
In 1956, he left Colombia and went to Costa Rica and El Salvador. Later in 1956, he settled permanently in Mexico City, where he would begin his public life.

Before 1960, he had arguably published 20 more books with topics ranging from endocrinology and criminology to kundalini yoga. He founded numerous Gnostic Institutions and created Gnostic centers in Mexico, Panama, El Salvador, Costa Rica, and Venezuela. A "triangle" relationship was established between the Universal Gnostic Movement founded by Samael Aun Weor, the South American Liberation Action (ALAS) in Argentina headed by Francisco A. Propato, Ph.D. (graduate of La Sorbonne and Spanish translator of The Rubaiyat of Omar Khayyam who later claimed to be a Gnostic master "Lakshmi"), and the Sivananda Aryabarta Ashram directed by Swami Sivananda in India.

In spite of its success, the development of the Gnostic Movement was not without dramatic setbacks, according to its followers. By the time of publishing the revised edition of The Perfect Matrimony (1961), the movement had fallen apart. Aun Weor wrote that "those who did not leave the Gnostic Movement can be counted on the fingers of one hand." However, by the time of his death, Samael Aun Weor believed that he had completely re-established the broad international reaches the movement previously held, even claiming:

It is a strong movement; at the present moment, it is the most powerful movement ever founded.

Into the 1960s, he continued to write many books on topics, such as hermetic astrology, flying saucers, and the Kabbalah. However, he also wrote sociopolitical works such as the Platform of POSCLA (Partido Socialista Cristiano Latinoamericano, or Latin-American Christian Socialist Party) and The Social Christ. Topics such as the "false" doctrines of Wall Street materialism, atheism, and particularly Marxism-Leninism are discussed. POSCLA's motto was given as, "All for one and one for all," and its method, the conscious practice of ahimsa.

=== Final written work ===
In the last decade of his life, he penned works such as Parsifal Unveiled, which details the esoteric symbolism of the Wagner opera (based on or plagiarised from the Spanish author Mario Roso de Luna), and Gnostic Anthropology in which he heavily criticized the theories of Darwin, Haeckel, "and their followers", claiming for example that monkeys "devolved" from humans. The books The Great Rebellion, Treatise of Revolutionary Psychology, and The Revolution of the Dialectic explain his theories on esoteric psychology and Dialectic. During this time, he was preparing The Pistis Sophia Unveiled, in which he gave a verse-by-verse commentary on the Gnostic text Pistis Sophia.

=== Death ===
By 1972, Samael Aun Weor wrote that his death and resurrection would be occurring before 1978. In the chapter entitled The Resurrection, in his work The Three Mountains (1972), he stated that the eight years of ordeals within the Trial of Job would occur between his 53rd and 61st birthdays. Furthermore, in the same work, it is stated that this ordeal occurs prior to resurrection, and the one going through it is "deprived of everything, even of his own sons, and is afflicted by an impure sickness." By August 1977 he had developed stomach cancer. During this time he continued to speak to both his students and the general public, giving radio and television interviews while touring Mexico. Eventually he was forced to stop, due to debilitating stomach pain. As his condition steadily worsened, he would mention to those at his bedside, "Don't cling to my battered body, instead cling to my doctrinal body." Aun Weor died on December 24, 1977.

Years before his death, he declared he would adopt the use of a duly prepared ancient Egyptian "mummy" as a vehicle for further work, a vehicle better prepared than his own "physical body". Many of his followers expected him to return publicly shortly after his death, as he had claimed to have undergone a ceremony of "Resurrection" and thus be capable of immortality. According to his own statements he planned to remain incognito for a certain time so that “the leaven will ferment.”

== Cult allegations ==
Samael Aun Weor's movement and the organizations derived from it have been described as sects or cults by religious authorities, cult researchers, journalists and former members; the groups reject the label.

The Roman Catholic Church has labeled Aun Weor's neo-Gnostic Movement as a pseudo-church and some Roman Catholic authors have accused Aun Weor of trying to seduce Roman Catholic priests and nuns to abandon their vows of celibacy and practice the sexual teachings promulgated by the neo-Gnostic Movement; these authors also believe that the current wave to discredit the legitimacy of the Roman Catholic Church comes from the same source while others go so far as to label it heresy.

As of 11 February 1984 or thereabouts, the Ministry of Tenerife, Spain, denied incorporation to Aun Weor's Universal Christian Gnostic Church of Spain operating from 38 San Francisco St., in Santa Cruz de Tenerife, Spain, on the grounds that said organization is not a legitimate church as it does not have any record of incorporation as such in any country whatsoever.

In 1990, after numerous consultations with high-ranking members of the Roman Catholic Church and other figures who preferred to remain anonymous such as lawyers, public prosecutors, psychiatrists and psychologists, Pilar Salarrullana, who has been a political figure since 1974 and is considered an expert on sects, published Las Sectas (The Sects: a living testament to Messianic terror in Spain), which became a best-seller with six editions the first year alone and denounces the Gnostic Movements among others as some of the most dangerous anti-social plagues in Spain.

In 1991, F. W. Haack (1935–1991), who was chief delegate of the Evangelical Church with responsibility for sects and ideologies, attacked Weor's ideology in a German book published in Zürich — nevertheless, the Gnostic branches of the movement in Germany and Switzerland are still active and expanding. The Gnostic associations are active in Switzerland with a moderate following of Italian-, French- and German-speaking members.

=== Criticism of the teachings ===
Critics and former members have described several of his doctrines as psychologically and socially harmful. His sexual teachings require practitioners to abstain from orgasm, which he described as a loss of spiritual energy; critics say this is treated within the groups as a grave sin that produces intense guilt. His writings condemn homosexuality as a path to spiritual damnation, prescribe domestic roles for women and permit divorce only for a wife's adultery, reject Darwinian evolution and conventional medicine in favour of "occult medicine", and repeatedly cite the antisemitic forgery The Protocols of the Elders of Zion. He also made apocalyptic predictions, including a "Third World War" by 1999 that would leave the planet radioactive.

=== Successor organizations ===
Since his death the movement has fragmented into numerous independent organizations, several of which have attracted controversy in Spain and Latin America.

==== Spain ====
Spanish cult researcher Luis Santamaría of the Red Iberoamericana de Estudio de las Sectas (RIES) has described Gnosis as one of the most significant gnostic sects operating in Spain. A 2022 report in El Español gathered testimony from a former member who spent ten years in a group following his teachings and described it as a sect; the Gnostic Church responded that it is not considered one. That year the city council of Benidorm withdrew a municipal venue it had granted for a Gnostic "self-knowledge" course after complaints from cult researchers and relatives of former members.

In 2015, a six-month-old girl was killed in a hotel in Santiago de Compostela during the XXII International Gnostic Congress, organized by the Instituto Gnóstico de Antropología Samael y Litelantes. Her mother, who was attending the congress, was later committed to a psychiatric institution for 25 years for the killing.

==== Mexico ====
Former members of the Movimiento Gnóstico A.C., headquartered in Minas de Barroterán, Coahuila, and led by Florentino Martínez Contreras, accused the organization of forced labour, human trafficking and sexual abuse; Proceso reported that the group's response did not dispute the specific allegations. Complaints were filed with the federal prosecutor's office, though no formal investigation had been opened at the time of reporting; the organization denied any mistreatment or trafficking.

== Teachings ==
Aun Weor called his system the "Doctrine of Synthesis", which he presented as a synthesis of the world's religious and esoteric traditions. Scholars have traced much of it to earlier esotericists, above all Gurdjieff (via Ouspensky) for its psychological theory and Arnoldo Krumm-Heller for its sexual practices, often without acknowledging them as sources.

Although Samael took many of his teachings directly from Blavatsky and Gurdjieff, these are considered by Gnostics to be only a conceptual foundation in Aun Weor's teachings, as preparation for the real unveiling of occultism or gnosis that he taught. He drew extensively on Blavatsky including her own idiosyncratic explanations of Buddhist philosophy, and the core of his teachings, such as the doctrine of multiple "I's" and the idea that the present state of the earth comes from a mistake by the archangels "Looisos" and "Sakkaki", comes directly from Gurdjieff.

Aun Weor suggests that his doctrine is experiential, and must be put into practice for it to be of any value to the student. Throughout his works there are hundreds of techniques and exercises that are said to of help in the development of psychic powers, for example leaving the dense physical body at will (astral projection), in order to be taught in the schools of the "Higher Worlds." The techniques include the combination of Aun Weor's techniques of "meditation" and "sexual transmutation". These may not have obvious effect; it is taught that the perfection of such powers may take more than one lifetime. The meditation techniques bear no similarity to those of Tibetan Buddhism, despite Samael having claimed to have been a member of the "Sacred Order of Tibet"

It is stated that if a student is successful in "awakening consciousness", he or she will eventually experience a continuous state of vigilance not only during the day but also while the physical body is sleeping, and most importantly after death. This is significant because Aun Weor states that those who have a sleeping consciousness are not aware of their postmortem condition, just as they are not aware when they are physically sleeping.

=== Religion ===
Religions are viewed as idiosyncratic expressions of immutable and eternal values. Religions are said to be born and die in time, yet their spiritual values always remain eternal. When a religious form has fulfilled its mission, it begins to degenerate and dies, then a new messenger appears and delivers a doctrine appropriate for that culture. Different cultures require different doctrines for their development and this results in a vast difference of religious doctrines. Nevertheless, if one understands their core values (according to Samael Aun Weor), all religions naturally support each other. It is stated that any authentic religion possess what are called "The Three Factors of the Revolution of the Consciousness" which are practical aspects of daily life:

1. Death: The psychological work of eliminating the ego.
2. Birth: Giving birth to the superior potential of the soul, which is done through chastity and sexual transmutation (explained under "Physiology and Sexology").
3. Sacrifice: To work to aid suffering humanity "without desiring the fruits of action, without desiring reward; pure, sincere, disinterested sacrifice, giving one's life in order for others to live, and without asking for anything in return."

Among these 3 factors, Aun Weor highlights that the first one is the most important. A teaching that is missing any one of these components is considered incomplete or degenerate, meaning in fact all present religious forms as none include "Birth" through "Sexual Transmutation".

=== Psychology ===
The basis of Aun Weor's practical work is his psychological theories. He states in many of his books that the purpose of his doctrine is to affect a psychological change. The terms Gnostic, Esoteric or Revolutionary Psychology are used to describe the psychological methods taught, and are said to be synonymous with the psychological teachings of religion.

A fundamental axiom presented is that an ordinary human being is not really human at all, but rather an intellectual animal (a rational animal) with consciousness asleep. According to Samael Aun Weor, a true human being is someone who has no psychological imperfection, an image of God, as in Jesus' saying, "Become perfect as your Father in Heaven is perfect." He believed himself to be an example of such a 'human being'. Aun Weor writes of the awakening of consciousness as being very similar to the traditional Buddhist understanding, though his doctrine differs from Buddhism in many important points.

In order to awaken the consciousness correctly, Aun Weor stated it was necessary to annihilate the ego. He taught that one's ego is really not one but many, or a multitude of independent, contradictory desires. Likewise, each person's ego is said to actually contain many "I's," many "egos," many "aggregates." Each desire is an "I" and each "I" has its own specific causes and conditions that lead to its personification at a particular time. This is the mechanism behind what is commonly called "changing one's mind" because when one "I" changes to another a literal exchange of personified psychological aggregates has taken place. This "doctrine of the many", the Plural 'I' or Pluralized Ego, is the same as that taught by G.I. Gurdjieff and his disciple P. D. Ouspensky and is one of the reasons Aun Weor is accused of plagiarism. To this he responded that Gurdjieff was not the author of this doctrine and that its origin is found in Egypt and Tibet, despite his lack of first-hand knowledge of Tibetan Buddhism (though he claimed to have met the Dalai Lama, who had travelled to see him in the "Jinn State") - in fact there is no such doctrine in any modern school of Tibetan Buddhism.

==== Consciousness ====
Consciousness is described as a state of being, very closely related to "God". The consciousness within the normal person is said to be 97% asleep. Consciousness asleep is consciousness that is subconscious, unconscious, or infraconscious, which are various levels of psychological sleep. Psychological sleep is a way to describe the lack of self-awareness, meaning that the common and ordinary person is not aware of 97% of what constitutes the ordinary state of being. A consciousness asleep is caused by what Aun Weor calls identification, fascination, or the incorrect transformation of impressions, which all imply a type of consciousness that is not aware of its own processes.

It is said that to awaken consciousness one must understand that his or her consciousness is asleep. This implies that one must begin to understand every impulse, action, thought and movement one makes, a feat that is said to be accomplished through the mental discipline of meditation and self-observation (the latter concept taken from Gurdjieff). Furthermore, it is stated that the awakening of consciousness is the only way to acquiring gnosis and achieve a true and radical change by removing the spurious psychological aggregates that cause unnecessary suffering. The awakening of consciousness goes hand in hand with the transmutation of sexual energy because the higher states of consciousness depend upon the energy of sexual transmutation (every time we orgasm, according to Samael, we give birth to "egos" and even align ourselves with dark forces).

==== Psychological aggregates ====
The purpose of the "psychological work" promoted by Samael is to "dissolve" all the psychological aggregates one has accumulated. The term "psychological or mystical death" is often used to describe the process one must undergo in order to reach liberation."Psychological aggregates" are commonly known simply as aggregates in Buddhism, yet according to his interpretation other religions used a more veiled or less sophisticated method to describe them, such as: the Legion that Jesus is described as removing from a man in one of the alleged Miracles of Jesus; overcoming the tortures of the 49 Self-willed demons of Yaldabaoth written in the Pistis Sophia; the killing of the "unbelievers" in Islam (seemingly ignoring the historical reality of Mohammed's various wars); Moses escaping the tyranny of the Egyptians; Arjuna fighting against his own blood (the ego); the demons of Seth that attack Osiris; Jesus throwing the merchants out of the temple;. Aun Weor states that the paradigm of the "multiple I's" is called "The Doctrine of the Many" and has been taught in esoteric schools and religions since the beginning of time.

In a similar vein, Samael also speaks about the theme of the archetypal death and resurrection of the "Solar Hero" exemplified in the stories of Jesus and Osiris; the descent to Dante's Inferno (representing our unconscious) or Paradise Lost's Pandemonium in order to accomplish a great task, such as those performed by Hercules or Orpheus; and the archetypal Dragon (ego) that must be slayed by the Knight, etc, associating these stories with his doctrine in which the person practising "Solar Chastity" is (psychologically) identified with these heroic figures.

In order to achieve psychological transformation, extensive methods of meditation, self-observation, and sexual transmutation are taught and prescribed for daily exercise. The goal of "psychological work" is the awakening of consciousness and ultimately the state of Paramarthasatya (a theosophical concept).

=== Physiology and sexology ===
Samael's views on sexuality are the defining and central aspect of his doctrine, he interprets it to be the fundamental factor in determining whether human beings possess angelic and divine or infernal qualities. Homosexuality is strictly condemned, as is monasticism.

We understand people of normal sexuality to be those who have no sexual conflicts of any kind. Sexual energy is divided into three distinct types. First: the energy having to do with the reproduction of the race and the health of the physical body in general. Second: the energy having to do with the spheres of thought, feeling and will. Third: the energy that is found related with the Divine Spirit of man.

Indeed, sexual energy is without a doubt the most subtle and powerful energy normally produced and transported through the human organism. Everything that a human being is, including the three spheres of thought, feeling and will, is none other than the exact outcome of distinct modifications of sexual energy.

— Samael Aun Weor

Samael gives his own interpretation of basic physiology, mostly endocrinology and the hormonal influence of primary and secondary sexual characteristics. It is taught that there are three fundamental nervous systems, the cerebrospinal nervous system, grand sympathetic nervous system, and the parasympathetic nervous system. These nervous systems are referred to as the "Three Brains" or three centers of the intellectual animal, and are named the intellectual center, the emotional center, and the motor-instinctual-sexual center. Each center is studied in relation to the types of energies or "occult hydrogens" (a concept of Gurdjieff) that animate them, the frequency at which each center operates (sexual center being the fastest, then emotional, then intellectual), and how psychological aggregates form and act within each center: psychological aggregates that are expressed through the intellect one way and through the emotions in a different way.

==== Three centers and three traitors ====
The three centers are directly related to the Trinity, Trimurti, or threefoldness of creation, the intellect being related to the Father (Kether, affirmation, positive), the emotion related to the Son (Chokmah, denial, negation), and the sexual center related to the Holy Spirit (Binah, reconcile, neutral). The primary energy of the intellectual brain (Father) is the air, which is then placed in the bloodstream which is related to the emotional brain (Son), and lastly the final condensation of blood is found in the semen or sexual hormones, which is directly related to the Holy Spirit: that which impregnates or manifests creation, Shakti, etc.

Aun Weor teaches that psychological aggregates form in one of these three centers; therefore, it is said that there are three fundamental defects: the demon of the mind related to the intellectual center, the demon of desire related to the emotional center, and the demon of evil will related to the motor-instinctual-sexual center. They are collectively referred to as the "Three Traitors", and many references to religion are found that are held to symbolize them, for example: Judas (desire), Pilate (intellect), and Caiaphas (will) who crucify Jesus; Jubela, Jubelo, and Jubelum who murder Hiram Abiff; Seth, in the form of the serpent Apophis and its two monstrous helpers Sebau and Nakmurders Osiris; the three Furies who attack Orestes. He also mentions the three daughters of Mara who attack Gautama Buddha - Samael states that these are conquered through right Thinking (Intellectual Center), right Feeling (Emotional Center), and Right Action (Motor-Instinctual-Sexual Center), although the first two are not in fact found in the Noble Eightfold Path.

==== Lunar and solar bodies ====
Occult or esoteric anatomy and physiology is also studied, which refers to the study of the supra-sensible bodies of minerals, plants, animals (rational and irrational), and human beings. It is said that everyone contains seven bodies, closely related to the Theosophical septenary, which Aun Weor calls physical, vital, emotional (astral), mental, causal, buddhic and atmic. Aun Weor differentiates between an intellectual animal and an authentic human being through the differences in the vehicles of emotion (astral body), mind (mental body) and will (causal body). Intellectual animals (ordinary man and woman) are said to contain the Lunar Astral Body, the Lunar Mental Body, and the Lunar Causal Body, each referred to by different names in different schools of Occultism. It is stated that these lunar bodies are the result of mechanical evolution through the mineral, plant and animal kingdoms and therefore, they are of an infrahuman or animal quality. The only true difference between the rational animal and irrational animals is the intellect, which gives the former the ability to become human, or as Aun Weor states, the intellectual animal has the "seed" or potential of a human latently existing within its sexual organs.

What are called authentic human beings, although physically appearing identical, have crystallized the solar bodies: solar astral body, solar mental body, and solar causal body. Lunar bodies are vehicles that receive the energy of creation (that is, God) at the level of an animal, while the solar bodies permit the reception of a much greater voltage allowing greater levels of wisdom and superior emotion to be incarnated. Aun Weor states that the solar bodies are collectively referred to as vehicles of the "soul".

Aun Weor states that the solar bodies are formed in the same manner that physical bodies are formed: through use of the sexual function. In order to form the solar bodies, sexual transmutation is taught via the hetero sexual magic of married couples engaged in coitus without orgasm or seminal ejaculation. Sexual magic is the arousal of sexual energies through the act of coitus between husband and wife, but instead of expelling those energies through orgasm they are transmuted into higher octaves of energy. Each successive Solar Body is the result of the saturation of transmuted sexual energy at its respective octave: first, the "Christ Astral" is formed by transmuting the sex energy into a second octave; second, the "Christ Mind" is formed by saturating, condensing or crystallizing the sexual energy into a third octave, and the causal body or "Christ Will" is formed by transmuting the sexual energy called "Hydrogen SI-12", into a fourth octave. The "birth" of the solar bodies is what Aun Weor states is the true meaning of being "born again." It is taught that the solar bodies are referred to in the Bible as the three sons of Noah or the three companions of Daniel in the (alchemical) furnace of Nebuchadnezzar.

==== Three forms of sexuality ====
The topic of sexuality is approached from a very stern point of view, and it is indeed the crux of Aun Weor's entire message. He states that there are three fundamental types of sexuality: suprasexuality, which is the sexual functioning of someone like Buddha or Jesus, who apparently naturally "transmute" all their energy perfectly; normal sexuality, which is defined as those who have no sexual conflict of any kind whatsoever and who transmute their sexual energy or use it to procreate the species; finally, the two spheres of infrasexuality, as described in the Kabbalistic texts: Nahemah's sphere of influence which includes fornication, adultery, addiction and prostitution and Lilith's sphere of influence, a category which includes homosexuality, masturbation, abortion, bestiality, sado-masochism and any other "abuse" of the sexual energy. In response to his harsh views towards sex (especially for a "New Age" teacher), he wrote:

Many hypocritical Pharisees hate us because we are not complaisant with whoredom, because we condemn crime, yet they state that this is why we hate. This is how they imprecisely judge us. What happens is that all of those hypocritical Pharisees from Spiritualism, Theosophism, Rosicrucianism, Aquarianism, etc., yearn for a sanctimonious mastery where masters are complaisant with crime; a type of spiritual whore-master who, complaisant with crime, goes around from lodge to lodge, from school to school, from sect to sect. This is why we, those who truly love humanity, are hated by hypocritical Pharisees.

— Samael Aun Weor

Samael expressed many homophobic opinions in his written work. He criticized various other sects, projecting homosexual "vices" onto the "degnerated" religions of the present day:

Well, I found that in many of those places that are taken as holy and transcendent, there were a large number of homosexuals. Yes, my dear brothers and sisters! I found many homosexual lamas in many of those places! The evil of the world is so great that even the sacred lands of Tibet have fallen into its snares. It is a real pity!

In his first book "The Perfect Matrimony" he writes at length about the "Sphere of Lilith", claiming that they are absolutely condemned and incapable of salvation. He refers to homosexuals as "rotten seeds" and speaks of his "disgust" at a "wretched" lesbian who "suffered exactly like a man".

=== Soteriology ===
Soteriology (study of salvation) is presented in the light of every notable religion yet usually with special differences not held by orthodox interpretations. There are many degrees of salvation generally accomplished by paying one's karma, removing the psychological imperfections and finally creating the solar bodies. The idea held by many religions that belief in God alone achieves salvation is categorically rejected.

Many different levels of salvation are explained, each depending upon the willpower of the individual accomplishing it. For those who do not remove their psychological imperfection (ego) – which is the cause of karma and the suffering of humanity – after approximately 108 rebirths they will have their ego removed forcefully through mechanical devolution within the infradimensions (Hell). Here it is said that "Mother Nature" mechanically pays out one's accumulated karma through a great deal of suffering over thousands of years until one is returned to the state of an innocent elemental, or Essence. This is said to be a state of being that is total happiness, yet not cognizant happiness and therefore not complete happiness. Hell is not taught as a place of eternal damnation, just a place to pay one's karma, and in fact it is seen as a part of God's grace because if the ego is not removed forcefully, these souls would continue to suffer indefinitely. It is held that after Hell, the elemental is reinserted into the mechanics of evolution in order to once again attempt to gain conscious happiness: They are first inserted at the basic level of existence (minerals), and through millions of years, transmigrate through increasingly complex organisms until the state of intellectual animal is reached again.

For those who do work on themselves, depending on the degree of perfection, happiness and wisdom they wish to attain, two distinct paths emerge: the Straight Path of the Razor's Edge and the Spiral Path. The Spiral Path involves reaching a state of relative enlightenment by choosing the enjoyment of the Higher Worlds (Heaven or Nirvana), and occasionally returning to a physical body in order to pay out a little more karma and help humanity in the process. Aun Weor refers to these as the Pratyeka Buddhas and Sravakas, and that the vast majority who reach this state choose the Spiral Path because it is very easy and enjoyable. The dangerous Straight Path of the Razor's Edge is the Path of the Bodhisattva who renounces the happiness of the Higher Worlds (Nirvana) in order to help humanity. In the doctrine of Aun Weor, the Bodhisattva has a very specific definition, as it is not merely someone who has taken the Bodhisattva vows. It is the physical (Malkuth), vital (Yesod), astral (Hod), mental (Netzach) and causal (Tiphereth) vehicles – in other words the human soul – of a self-realized spirit, (Geburah-Chesed) who has chosen the Straight Path of the Razor's Edge in order to incarnate the Christ (Kether-Binah-Chokmah). In other words, the Bodhisattva is the "Son" of a self-realized God who is trying to return to the Absolute or 13th Aeon of the Pistis Sophia.

==== Christology ====
Christ is viewed as the savior but not as traditionally understood by contemporary Christianity. Instead, Christ is an impersonal force or intelligence that emanates from the Absolute as the Trinity and is also referred to as the Cosmic Christ. Christ is said to have existed before Jesus, and is represented in different traditions with names such as Thoth, Ormuz, Ahura Mazda, Osiris, Zeus, Jupiter, Quetzalcoatl, Okidanokh (a term from Gurdjieff), Kulkulcan, Chrestos, Baldur, and Avalokitesvara. It is held that Christ enters into and exalts any individual who is properly prepared, which denotes the complete annihilation of the ego, the exhaustion of all karma and the birth of the solar vehicles, the latter is necessary to handle the super high voltage of Christ. Aun Weor writes that only those who choose the previously mentioned Straight Path of the Razor's Edge can incarnate the Christ because the Spiral Path is not a path of total sacrifice. Likewise, any true Bodhisattva has incarnated the Christ or is in process of doing so. It is said that in history Christ incarnated in Jesus, Buddha, Mohammed, Krishna, Moses, Padmasambhava, John the Baptist, Milarepa, Mahavatar Babaji, Joan of Arc, Fu Xi, Ramakrishna as well as many others now forgotten by time (or made up in works of fiction) e. g. Zanoni

It is important to notice that some of these individuals represent Christ as an impersonal force, e. g. Jesus, meaning that although he was an individual Christ, he taught the doctrine of the Cosmic Christ, intentionally molding his physical life after the psychological processes that one undergoes to incarnate the Christ. As with Buddha, Jesus is seen as a Bodhisattva who came to help humanity. Jesus is viewed as the Savior of the World because he is a Paramarthasatya (an inhabitant of the Absolute) that physically incarnated specifically for the sake of poor suffering humanity. According to Aun Weor, Jesus purposefully played out physically the internal or psychological struggle one must undergo in the path of Self-Realization; thus, the Gospels are a mixture of reality and kabbalistic, initiatic symbolism. According to Aun Weor, there is the historic Christ as depicted in Christian Churches; then, there is the Christ of Transubstantiation to be known exclusively through the Gnostic Church; and finally, there is the Apocalyptic Christ who is to come with the New Jerusalem, after the Great Cataclysm that will consume the world.

=== Anthropology ===
His work Cosmic Teachings of a Lama states that life on Earth did not occur through abiogenesis, but instead through pansperma. To Aun Weor, the theories of abiogenesis are similar to those of spontaneous generation, and that Pasteur had already implicitly refuted the former when the latter was empirically disproved. Furthermore, while evolution is a verified fact of nature, speciation through Darwinian evolution has never been witnessed and is "an absurd theory without basis or foundation." Instead, the sum of zoological variation is determined by the seeds of life traveling throughout space (protected by electromagnetic "whirlwinds") which determine the evolution and devolution of life on any planet. Life, according to Aun Weor, is eternal, however its expression is divided into evolutive and devolutive modes: species evolve, reach a pinnacle, and necessarily devolve and return to a germinal state.

Man, therefore, is not the outcome of the evolution from a common ancestor to the primates, but rather the exponent of an eternal anthropic principle. Monkeys, apes, and other primates are instead the outcome of certain sub-sects of ancient humanity copulating with animals, and are in a complete state of devolution.

They say that the human being comes from the ape. They came out with the theory of the cynocephalus with a tail, the monkey without a tail and the arboreal men, all of them children of the noeptizoids, etc. But, which of these would then be the missing link? On what day have they found a monkey that is capable of speaking, that is gifted with speech? It has not appeared until now. Therefore, these materialistic gentlemen are ludicrous. They only present us suppositions and not facts. Therefore are not the materialists refuting the theories of Darwin himself and his henchmen? Does the human being come from the ape? Upon which basis do they sustain this theory? How do they demonstrate it? Until when are we going to wait for the supposed missing link? We want to see that specie of ape speaking like people. That ape has not appeared, therefore such an ape is only a supposition of nonsense that has no reality.

Despite his hostility to the Darwinian theory, he states that evolution within a species is possible, yet that no species can evolve from another species. Furthermore, he states that the human or 'intellectual animal' naturally evolves in time, for example our society is an evolution from previous societies — however the evolution of species can never achieve spiritual liberation because it will always return to devolution. Spiritual liberation requires a 'revolution of consciousness'.

=== Eschatology ===
In many books Aun Weor wrote about the "Final Catastrophe" or Apocalypse which was central to the framing of his teachings. His work The Aquarian Message is a commentary on the Book of Revelation, which affirms the notion that present civilization will end and a future one will emerge. Only those souls who remove their ego in the present time will avoid the Second Death and re-transmigrations. A specific date is never given, only that this civilization is in the twilight of its existence.

=== The Social Christ and POSCLA ===
Aun Weor wrote about social problems in the books The Social Christ and The Social Transformation of Humanity. The Social Christ is primarily concerned with a comprehensive critique of Marxism or Dialectical Materialism, but deals also with the injustices of the Capitalist system;

We are filled with horror in the presence of so much infamy. The ones that cannot pay for a stall in the public markets are persecuted, but they flatter and butter up the powerful gentlemen that steal millions of pesos from the people. In this way the capitalists fertilize the soil and prepare it in order that in it the filthy flower of Communism can germinate.

All political systems, Aun Weor states, are a reflection of our own psychology, and he explains that in order to finally finish with oppression it is necessary to change our own psychological state through the Death of Ego, combining this with non-violent resistance and the unionization of workers.

The struggle for the triumph of social justice is very long and hard, but we must never use violence, nor revolutions of blood and liquor.

In order "to start a new age and realize the Social Christ on the face of the earth," Aun Weor formed a political party called 'POSCLA', The Christian Socialist Party of Latin America, which he later disbanded as a formal organization.

=== Medicine and elemental magic ===
In his works, Occult Medicine and Practical Magic, Igneous Rose and others, Aun Weor taught about elemental magic. In the former work he expressed his opposition to the medicine of modern science, allopathy, and called for the Gnostics to learn the ways of Indigenous and Elemental Medicine.

Aun Weor taught that all the plants of nature are living Elemental Spirits, similarly to Paracelsus and many other esoteric teachers. He states that it is the Elemental Spirits who cure, not simply the 'cadavers of the plants'. Plants should be treated as living beings, harvested at the proper hours etc. He stated that the Elementals of all plants are aspects of The Divine Mother in the form of Mother Nature. In 'Occult Medicine and Practical Magic' he spoke about the healing methods of the Kogi Mamas, who diagnose sicknesses by means of clairvoyance.

=== Views on Women and Marriage ===
Samael viewed divorce as permissible only in the case of the wife committing adultery. Divorce due to “incompatibility of character” is “simply a crime”:

Samael Aun Weor: The fact is that if the woman was a problem for the man, or if the husband was another problem for the woman, then there is no other choice but to put up with it. Why? Because marriage, home, is a wonderful psychological gymnasium.

Lady: Master, but even if the man seriously injures the woman, and goes against her honor and her dignity?

Samael Aun Weor: Well madam, even in that case, if the woman is intelligent enough, she takes advantage of the man to discover herself. Let's see, what was it that insulted her? Self-love, pride, what?

He goes on to say:

Lady: Master, you said that the only cause for divorce was if the woman was unfaithful to the man.

Samael Aun Weor: Yes...

... I don't want to say that men can afford to commit adultery and that is why they are not going to pay karma. Of course, if a man commits adultery, he pays karma, but between adultery and adultery, there are differences…

...So, then, conclusion: adultery in women is more serious. That is why, precisely at the time of Moses, women who committed adultery were publicly stoned, because by committing adultery women end the home, they turn it to dust.

He also advises that men or women should remain with their partners while practising the “Arcanum AZF” even if their partner does not perform such “sexual transmutation”:

that woman has to transmute by pretending to be a fornicator, without being one, duly keeping quiet, mantralizing, that is, using the silenced verb and never fall into physiological orgasm. Obviously, the sacrifice in this way is double, triple; therefore, the result is immediate, it is wonderful.

In general, he believed that women should not occupy themselves with “masculine” subjects, and be prepared instead for the “sublime mission that corresponds to them as mother and as wife”.

Fathers and mothers must understand the difference between the sexes. It is absurd for daughters to study physics, chemistry, algebra, etc. The female brain is different from that of the male, such subjects are very much in accordance with the male sex but are useless and even harmful to the female mind.

It is necessary that fathers and mothers of families fight wholeheartedly to promote a vital change in all school curriculum.

Women must learn to read, write, play the piano, knit, embroider and in general all kinds of feminine trades.

=== Views on Judaism ===
Samael speaks of his anti-semitic views on Judaism in "The Aquarian Message":

In the year 1950, the genie of evil whose name is Javhe entered into the abyss. Javhe is paying a terrible karma. Javhe is a terribly perverse fallen Angel. This Javhe is the demon that tempted Jesus in the wilderness while saying "Itababo."

Javhe is the supreme chief of the Black Lodge. Javhe is the secret author of the crucifixion of our Adorable Saviour. Javhe is the antithetic pole of Jesus.

The Roman soldiers who crucified the Adorable One were constituting the honorable guards of Javhe. Thus, this is why Javhe is now crucified within the abyss. This is his karma, the cross of the devil is inverted.

Therefore, Javhe is crucified with his head downwards and his feet upwards.

The Jewish people worship Javhe and they follow Javhe.

Samael references the so-called "Protocols of the Elders of Zion" multiple times in his works.

=== Claimed Reincarnations ===
Samael claimed to have had multiple previous reincarnations, including some rather grandiose characters:

“Disappointed by his previous experiences, and after having devoted himself to the study of Eliphas Lévi (Alphonse-Louis Constant, 1810–75), Rudolf Steiner (1861-1925) and Max Heindel (Carl Louis von Grasshoff, 1865–1919), he withdrew for a period of meditation, during which he discovered that in his previous lifetimes he had been an Egyptian priest, Julius Caesar, a member of a Tibetan order consisting of 201 monks who sustained mankind, and the equivalent of Jesus on the moon. To save mankind residing on the moon, he had been crucified and entrusted with preparing the coming of the "Fifth race root", according to the classic theosophical scheme elaborated by Helena Petrovna Blavatsky.”

=== Belief in Extra-Terrestrial Life ===
Samael believed that there is humanoid extraterrestrial life on the planets of our own solar system, including on Venus, Mars and Ganymede, a moon of Jupiter. He claimed that the inhabitants of Mars moved the cameras sent by NASA, pointing them towards the Moon, in order to prevent their planet from being mapped. He also claims that there are 13 planets in the solar system (including Vulcan, Persephone and Clarion) and previously a 14th which was destroyed by its inhabitants with nuclear weapons, and that the earth has a second moon called "Lilith" which is visible to astronomers.

He states that the current human race is too destructive to be contacted openly by extraterrestrial lifeforms.

== Publications ==
Aun Weor wrote over sixty books, covering a broad range of esoteric, philosophical, and anthropological subjects. The following is taken in part from the "Bibliography of Samael Aun Weor" although a more accurate list may exist.

- 1950 - The Perfect Matrimony, or The Door to Enter into Initiation (Revised and expanded in 1961. See below) ISBN 978-1-934206-68-3
- 1950 - The Revolution of Beelzebub, 2007 ISBN 978-1-934206-18-8
- 1951 - The Zodiacal Course, published in English as part of Practical Astrology, 2006 ISBN 978-1-934206-38-6
- 1952 - Secret Notes of a Guru
- 1952 - Treatise of Occult Medicine and Practical Magic (Revised and expanded in 1978. See below) ISBN 978-1-934206-32-4
- 1952 - Gnostic Catechism
- 1952 - Christ Consciousness
- 1952 - The Power is in the Cross
- 1952 - The Book of the Virgin of Carmen
- 1953 - The Seven Words (Included in the collection "The Divine Science," ISBN 978-1-934206-40-9)
- 1953 - Igneous Rose, 2007 ISBN 978-1-934206-26-3
- 1954 - The Manual of Practical Magic, published in English as part of Practical Astrology ISBN 978-1-934206-38-6
- 1954 - Treatise of Sexual Alchemy
- 1955 - The Mysteries of the Fire: Kundalini Yoga ISBN 978-1-934206-10-2
- 1955 - Cosmic Ships ISBN 978-1-934206-39-3
- 1956 - The Major Mysteries ISBN 978-1-934206-19-5
- 1958 - The Magnum Opus
- 1958 - Universal Charity
- 1958 - Esoteric Treatise of Theurgy (Included in the collection "The Divine Science," ISBN 978-1-934206-40-9)
- 1959 - The Mountain of Juratena
- 1959 - 'Fundamental Notions of Endocrinology and Criminology' ISBN 978-1-934206-11-9
- 1959 - Christ Will
- 1959 - Logos, Mantra, Theurgy (Included in the collection "The Divine Science," ISBN 978-1-934206-40-9)
- 1959 - The Yellow Book ISBN 978-1-934206-53-9
- 1960 - The Aquarian Message ISBN 978-1-934206-31-7
- 1961 - Introduction to Gnosis ISBN 978-1-934206-73-7
- 1961 - The Perfect Matrimony (revised), 2009 ISBN 978-1-934206-68-3
- 1962 - The Mysteries of Life and Death (Included in the collection "Beyond Death" ISBN 978-1-934206-33-1)
- 1963 - Marriage, Divorce and Tantra (Included in "Introduction to Gnosis" ISBN 978-1-934206-73-7)
- 1963 - Gnosis in the Twentieth Century
- 1963 - Great Supreme Universal Manifesto of the Gnostic Movement
- 1964 - The Social Christ
- 1964 - Christmas Message 1964-1965 ("The Dissolution of the I") Title given by students. Available as Elimination of Satan's Tail ISBN 978-1-934206-17-1)
- 1964 - Grand Gnostic Manifesto of the Third Year of Aquarius
- 1965 - The Social Transformation of Humanity
- 1965 - Supreme Christmas Message 1965-1966 ISBN 978-1-934206-82-9
- 1966 - The Book of the Dead (Included in the collection "Beyond Death" ISBN 978-1-934206-33-1)
- 1967 - Platform of POSCLA
- 1967 - Christmas Message 1966-1967 ISBN 978-1-934206-69-0
- 1967 - An Esoteric Treatise of Hermetic Astrology, published in English as part of Practical Astrology ISBN 978-1-934206-38-6
- 1967 - Christmas Message 1967-1968: The Solar Bodies and Gnostic Wisdom published in English as The Doomed Aryan Race, 2008 ISBN 978-1-934206-30-0
- 1967 - Flying Saucers, included in Cosmic Ships ISBN 978-1-934206-39-3
- 1968 - Constitution and Liturgy of the Gnostic Movement (For Second and Third Chamber Students ONLY).
- 1968 - We'll Reach the One Thousand, But Not the Two Thousand (Title given by students).
- 1968 - Supreme Christmas Message 1967-1968
- 1969 - Esoteric Course of Kabbalah, published in English as Alchemy & Kabbalah ISBN 978-1-934206-36-2
- 1969 - Christmas Message 1968-1969: The Gnostic Magic of the Runes, 2007 ISBN 978-1-934206-29-4
- 1969 - Christmas Message 1969-1970: My Return to Tibet, a title given by students in Spanish and published in English as Cosmic Teachings of a Lama, 2007 ISBN 978-1-934206-21-8
- 1970 - Fundamental Education ISBN 978-1-934206-34-8
- 1970 - Beyond Death ISBN 978-1-934206-33-1
- 1971 - Christmas Message 1971-1972 (Parsifal Unveiled)
- 1971 - Christmas Message 1971-1972: The Mystery of the Golden Blossom ISBN 978-1-934206-43-0
- 1972 - Grand Gnostic Manifesto 1972
- 1972 - Christmas Message 1972-1973: The Three Mountains, 2007 ISBN 978-1-934206-28-7
- 1972 - Gazing at the Mystery ISBN 978-1-934206-25-6
- 1973 - Aztec Christic Magic ISBN 978-1-934206-27-0 (Lessons date from 1957)
- 1973 - Christmas Message 1973-1974 (Yes, There is a Hell, a Devil, and Karma) ISBN 978-1-934206-51-5
- 1974 - The Metallic Planets of Alchemy
- 1974 - The Secret Doctrine of Anahuac
- 1975 - 'The Great Rebellion' ISBN 978-1-934206-22-5
- 1975 - Liturgy of the Gnostic Movement (For Second and Third Chamber Students ONLY).
- 1975 - Revolutionary Psychology ISBN 978-1-934206-24-9
- 1976 - Sacred Book of Gnostic Liturgy (For Second and Third Chamber Students ONLY).
- 1977 - The Mysteries of Christic Esoterism
- 1977 - The Kabbalah of the Mayan Mysteries
- 1977 - Esoteric Course of Theurgy (Included in the collection "The Divine Science," ISBN 978-1-934206-40-9)
- 1978 - Gnostic Anthropology' ISBN 978-1-934206-16-4
- 1978 - Didactic Self-knowledge (Collected Lectures).
- 1978 - Christmas Message 1977-1978: Treatise of Occult Medicine and Practical Magic (revised) ISBN 978-1-934206-32-4
- 1978 - The Initiatic Path in the Arcana of Tarot and Kabbalah ISBN 978-1-934206-37-9
- 1980 - For the Few
- 1983 - The Revolution of the Dialectic ISBN 978-1-934206-02-7
- 1983 - The Gnostic Bible: The Pistis Sophia Unveiled ISBN 978-1-934206-81-2

== See also ==
- Fourth Way
- Mysticism
