= The Perfect Matrimony =

1950 book by Samael Aun Weor

- Author: Samael Aun Weor
- Language: English
- Genre: Spirituality
- Publication date: 1950

The Perfect Matrimony or The Door to Enter Into Initiation is the first of approximately seventy books written by Samael Aun Weor. It was first published in 1950 then revised and expanded in 1961.

It describes the esoteric teachings of alchemy, tantra, kabbalah, the mysteries of the Maya, Aztecs, ancient Egyptians, Tibetans, and Essenes, among others. The sexual aspect of religion is stressed in every religion it covers, stating bluntly that "the topic of this book is exclusively Sexual Magic." Sexual magic is explained as the synthesis of all religion. From the introduction of the 1960 edition:

Sexual magic is practiced in esoteric Christianity. Sexual magic is practiced in Zen Buddhism. Sexual magic is practiced amongst the Initiated Yogis. Sexual magic is practiced amongst the Muslim Sufis. Sexual magic was practiced in the Initiatic Colleges of Troy, Egypt, Rome, Carthage, Eleusis. Sexual magic was practiced by the mysterious Maya, Aztec, Inca, Druids, ...

The author presents a wide selection of religion and mystery schools from esoteric viewpoints, highlighting data traditionally thought to be unimportant, or otherwise understood in an unrelated manner. The primary message is that upright sexuality, exemplified through sexual magic, is the cornerstone upon which all authentic religion, yoga and occultism is based.

The Perfect Matrimony is a discourse on how to transform the sexual energy into its superior aspects via sexual transmutation. It states that there are three types of Sexual Magic, or Tantra: Black, Grey, and White. Black Tantra involves the ejaculation of semen, and Grey Tantra sometimes concludes with orgasm or ejaculation, while White Tantra always opposes any loss of sexual energy whatsoever, in other words, without orgasm or ejaculation. It exclusively advocates White Tantra as the path to achieve "self-realization" and to "achieve cosmic consciousness." This system of classification is not found in any of the traditional Tantric texts; however, it is also true that tantra yoga has been historically gupta vidya, or esoteric knowledge not contained in books.

Sexual magic is explained to be the same as maithuna, sexual yoga, urdhvareta yoga.

The Perfect Matrimony also states that Jesus was married and practiced sexual yoga with his wife.
