= Arnold Krumm-Heller =

German writer, occultist, doctor and intelligence agent (1876–1949)

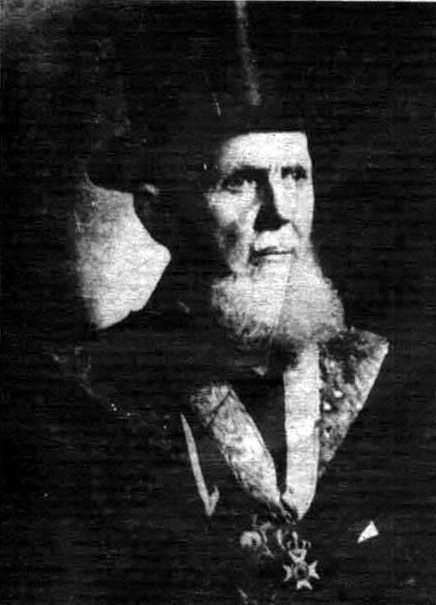
- Born: 15 April 1876; Salchendorf, Germany
- Died: 19 April 1949 (aged 73); Marburg, Germany
- Occupations: Doctor, occultist, Rosicrucian
- Known for: Founder of Fraternitas Rosicruciana Antiqua
- Medical career
- Sub-specialties: Occultism, gnosis and spiritualism

Heinrich Arnold Krumm-Heller (15 April 1876 – 19 April 1949) was a German doctor, occultist, Rosicrucian, and founder of Fraternitas Rosicruciana Antiqua (FRA), a Hermetic order in Brazil. He also was a German naval intelligence agent during the Mexican Revolution and World War I. A prolific writer, he published more than 30 esoteric books, novellas, history books, biographies, as well as countless articles in his magazine Rosa Cruz and similar publications.

== Biography ==
Arnold Krumm-Heller was born in Salchendorf, Germany in April 1876. He left Germany "with permission of the military authority" at age eighteen and worked in Chile, Peru, and Mexico mostly as a scientist. In Mexico he began to methodically study occultism, gnosis and spiritualism, becoming familiar with the works of Helena Blavatsky, Louis Claude de Saint-Martin, Papus and Eliphas Lévi. Between 1907 and 1909 he studied medicine in Paris and returned to Mexico in 1910.

Krumm-Heller became the private doctor of the future Mexican president Francisco Madero in the beginning of 1911. According to the American Military Intelligence Division MID, Krumm-Heller worked for Felix A. Sommerfeld in the Mexican Secret Service in January 1912. In 1913, again reporting to the German naval intelligence agent Sommerfeld, Krumm-Heller became a secret agent for Venustiano Carranza who sent him on diplomatic missions to Texas. Then-Governor James E. Ferguson, with the prodding from the German secret service agent, was the first U.S. state executive to formally recognize the Constitutionalists in the Mexican Revolution as the legitimate government of Mexico. Carranza also dispatched Krumm-Heller on diplomatic missions to Argentina and Chile. In June 1913 the government of Victoriano Huerta arrested Krumm-Heller, ostensibly for hosting a "meeting of socialists and anarchists." Germany intervened on his behalf and effected his release. Documents in the German National Archives show that the German government thought Krumm-Heller to be weird at best, maybe even mentally deranged, but loyal and fanatically committed to the Fatherland.

Appearing in El Paso in the summer of 1913, the trained doctor met up again with Carranza and served as a colonel in the Constitutionalist army. He became General Álvaro Obregón's chief of artillery, an occupation many German and American mercenaries such as Emil Lewis Holmdahl, Sam Dreben, and Tex O'Reilly pursued. Artillery required precision, thorough knowledge of mathematics, and most artillery pieces used at the time were either German or French-made cannon. In the German army, training focused on the effective use of cannon in combination with cavalry attacks, a strategy that Mexican revolutionaries knew very little about. After the outbreak of World War I in August 1914, Krumm-Heller worked for the German Naval Intelligence Service. On a mission to Germany, British authorities arrested him at Falmouth as a spy. Because of his Mexican citizenship he could resume his trip to Berlin where the agent spent the rest of the war as the military attaché for the Mexican embassy. While in Mexico he also founded the Society of the Iron Cross, a Germanic-imperialist order, with Carranza as head and himself as secretary. In his published works he presented himself as a "rational nationalist".

After he moved to Germany, he became a bishop in the Gnostic Church. He joined several esoteric and fraternal orders, including Ordo Templi Orientis (OTO), and was a contemporary of Theodor Reuss (founder of the OTO) and of Spencer Lewis (Imperator of AMORC). He knew Aleister Crowley and was greatly influenced by his mystical conceptions. Aleister Crowley, while in Berlin showing his paintings, wrote in his diary for February 11, 1932: "[Krumm-Heller] here with Peryt Shou". "In the issue of his magazine Rosa Cruz, dated April 27, 1933, he spoke of Hitler as a stormy fighter of the working class whose ideas should be adopted by all countries. It was unfortunate, Krumm-Heller opined, that the press compared Hitler with Mussolini, as there was a big difference: Mussolini stripped the Italian King of his power whereas the Germans were rendered powerless by the socialists. Krumm-Heller saw two scapegoats: the Jews and the ideals of the French Revolution. In Krumm-Heller's eyes, The Hitlerianismo should create a new philosophy, that is a new German identity.

He participated in Freemasonry in the Ancient and Accepted Scottish Rite and the Ancient and Primitive Rite of Memphis-Mizraím. In Peru he received the symbolic name of Huiracocha, by which he would be known in esoteric circles. He started the FRA or Fraternitas Rosicruciana Antiqua, having become distanced from both the O.T.O. and Spencer Lewis. Krumm-Heller died in Marburg, Germany, in April 1949, aged 73.

== Published works ==
- Mi sistema (1896)
- No Fornicarás (1908)
- Conferencias esotéricas (1909) - 1 ed -Casa editora Guerrero Hmnos
- Humboldt (1910)
- Trilogia heróica
- El Zodíaco Azteca en comparación con el de los Incas (1910)
- Los Tatwas y sus aplicaciones en la vida diaria (1911)
- La Ley de Karma (1912)
- Für Freihert und Recht (1916)
- Alfredo (1917)
- Hertha das Strassenmädchen (1917)
- Der Rosencreuzer aus Mexico (1918)
- Mexico mein Vaterland (1918)
- Rosa Cruz, novela de ocultismo iniciático (1926)
- Tratado de Quirología Médica (1927)
- El Tatwámetro o las vibraciones del éter (1927)
- El Secreto de la Suerte (1928)
- Logos, Mantran, Magia (1930)
- Biorritmo (1930)
- Rosa Esotérica (1930)
- Die Gnostische Kirche / La Iglesia Gnostica (1931)
- Plantas Sagradas (1934)
- Del Incienso a la Osmoterapia (1ed - Biblioteca del espiritu - vol -4 - ed cultura - chile 1936)
- Arisches Weistum (1935)
- Akademie für die Rechte der Völker (1939)
- Osmologische Heilkunde (1955)
- Curso de taumaturgia
- El mágico poder del mantran
- Las enseñanzas de la Antigua fraternidad rosacruz
- Curso runico
