= Fraternitas Rosicruciana Antiqua =

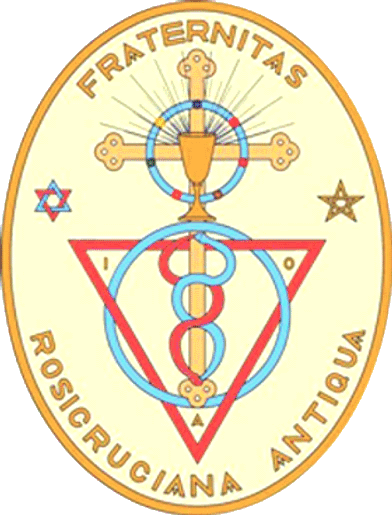
- Formation: 1932
- Founder: Arnold Krumm-Heller

The Fraternitas Rosicruciana Antiqua (FRA) is a Rosicrucian Order originally established by German occultist Dr. Arnold Krumm-Heller, and acts in Brazil and Spanish-speaking countries. In Brazil, it was established in 1932 and has had its headquarters in Rio de Janeiro since 1933. The Brazilian FRA is associated with Fraternitas Rosae Crucis (FRC), a Rosicrucian fraternity with its headquarters in U.S., and with the Ecclesia Gnostica, its ecclesiastical branch.
