= Sam Dreben =

US Army soldier and mercenary

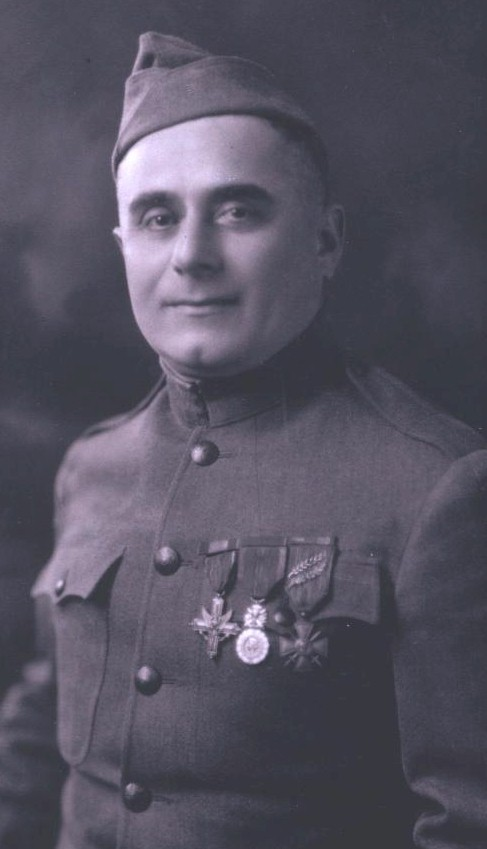
- Sam Dreben in 1918
- Nickname: The Fighting Jew
- Born: Samuel Dreben; June 1, 1878; Poltava, Russian Empire (now Ukraine)
- Died: March 15, 1925 (aged 46) Los Angeles
- Buried: Grand View Memorial Park Cemetery
- Allegiance: United States
- Branch: United States Army
- Service years: 1899–1925
- Rank: First sergeant
- Service number: 1480481
- Conflicts: Philippine–American War; Boxer Rebellion; Mexican Revolution; World War I
- Awards: Distinguished Service Cross; Croix de guerre Médaille militaire
- Spouse: Helen Dreben

Samuel Dreben (June 1, 1878 – March 15, 1925), sometimes misspelled "Drebben" or "Drebin", and known as "The Fighting Jew", was a highly decorated soldier in the US Army and a mercenary who fought in a variety of wars and revolutions.

== Early life ==
He was born in Poltava, Russian Empire (now Ukraine), on June 1, 1878. With prospects for a Jew in Czarist Russia exceedingly bleak, he ran away twice (once reaching Germany), before emigrating for good at the age of eighteen. He went first to Liverpool, where he worked as a dock hand, then to the United States, arriving in New York City in January 1899.

== Military career ==
Dreben enlisted on June 27, 1899, in the 14th Infantry Regiment and was shipped to the Philippines (acquired by the U.S. as a result of its victory in the Spanish–American War) to help put down a native insurrection led by Emilio Aguinaldo. He quickly distinguished himself in battle. Later, he participated in the rescue of Westerners besieged in Beijing during the Boxer Rebellion. Mustered out in 1902, he took a succession of unsatisfactory jobs, including an attempt to fight for the Japanese in the Russo-Japanese War, before reenlisting in 1904. This time, he was stationed at Fort Bliss. It was here that he was trained how to use a machine gun, a skill for which he became well-known (and would need in later years). He made friends in nearby El Paso, Texas before his second Army hitch ended in 1907.

Together with two other mercenaries and machine gun experts, Tracy Richardson and Emil Lewis Holmdahl, Dreben's wanderings then took him to Central America. He worked as a security guard in the Panama Canal Zone. After several unsuccessful business ventures, he was recruited to fight for various liberation movements or coups such as those in Guatemala, Honduras, Nicaragua, and Mexico. It was in Guatemala that he suffered his only combat wound – a shot in the rear. In the Mexican Revolution, Dreben joined the forces of Francisco Madero as a machine gunner. After Madero's murder in 1913, Dreben worked for Felix A. Sommerfeld in El Paso, smuggled arms to Pancho Villa's forces, and went on sabotage missions in Mexico for Sommerfeld's secret service. When Villa made his infamous raid on Columbus, New Mexico, on March 9, 1916, killing some civilians, Dreben joined the Punitive Expedition sent by an outraged America to bring his former comrade-in-arms to justice. Dreben served as a scout and became good friends with the expedition's commander, Major General John J. Pershing. The Americans were never able to catch the elusive Villa, and the fiasco eventually came to an end in 1917.

In early 1917, Dreben (then 39) married 19-year-old Helen Spence. They soon had a baby daughter. However, America's entry into World War I eventually lured him back into the Army, enlisting in the 141st Infantry Regiment of the 36th Infantry Division. En route to the fighting in France, he received word that his child had died.

Dreben once again distinguished himself in combat. For his bravery at St. Etienne in October 1918, Sergeant Dreben was awarded the Distinguished Service Cross, the Croix de guerre and the Médaille militaire. General Pershing, now commander of the American Expeditionary Forces, called him "the finest soldier and one of the bravest men I ever knew." The citation for his Distinguished Service Cross reads:

The President of the United States of America, authorized by Act of Congress, July 9, 1918, takes pleasure in presenting the Distinguished Service Cross to First Sergeant Sam Dreben (ASN: 1480481), United States Army, for extraordinary heroism in action while serving with Company A, 141st Infantry Regiment, 36th Division, A.E.F., near St. Etienne, France, 8 October 1918. Sergeant Dreben discovered a party of German troops going to the support of a machine-gun nest situated in a pocket near where the French and American lines joined. Sergeant Dreben called for volunteers and, with the aid of about 30 men, rushed the German positions, captured four machine-guns, killed more than 40 of the enemy, captured two, and returned to our lines without the loss of a man.

== Post-war life ==
After the end of the war, Dreben returned to El Paso, where he divorced his wife because of her infidelity in his absence. Dreben then settled down and started a successful insurance business.

In 1921, Dreben received another honor; he was selected by General Pershing to be one of the honorary pallbearers (along with another World War I hero, Alvin York) for the burial of the Unknown Soldier at Arlington National Cemetery on November 11.

In the same year, Dreben and some others were recruited by El Paso police to illegally extradite an escaped prisoner, Phil Alguin, who had murdered Los Angeles Police Detective Sergeant John J. Fitzgerald. The men set up a false medical office in Ciudad Juárez, Mexico, advertising the removal of tattoos. The plan was that when Alguin came in for treatment, they would apply anesthetic, then drive him to El Paso. However, Alguin was not rendered fully unconscious and was able to cry for help. Dreben and the others were arrested, but were released from prison after three days due to pressure from the United States.

In 1923, he married for the second time, this time to Meade Andrews. She convinced him to move to California for a fresh start.

On March 15, 1925, Dreben died when a nurse accidentally injected him with the wrong substance. Newspapers all over the country, including the New York Times and the El Paso Times, paid tribute to him. Famed columnist Damon Runyon wrote a eulogy, and the Texas legislature adjourned for a day in his honor. He is buried in Glendale, California's Grand View Memorial Park Cemetery.

Dreben was played by Alan Arkin in And Starring Pancho Villa as Himself.

== Additional information ==
- Art Leibson, Sam Dreben: The Fighting Jew, Tucson, Arizona : Westernlore Press, 1996
- "Hero of Many Wars Has Quit", The Los Angeles Times, July 11, 1920, p. V4
- "True Soldier of Fortune", The Los Angeles Times, Oct. 4, 1922, p. 13
- "Sam Dreben is Angeleno Now", The Los Angeles Times, July 18, 1923, p. II8
- McNutt, William Slavens (May 2, 1925). "Sam Dreben". Profiles. The New Yorker. Vol. 1, no. 11. pp. 13–14.
- "Taps Today for Soldier of Fortune", The Los Angeles Times, March 16, 1925, p. A1
- "Sam Dreben Death Suit Dismissed", Los Angeles Times, May 13, 1926, p. A23
- Herman Archer, "Famous Soldiers of Fortune", Chicago Daily Tribune, Aug 28, 1927, p. S2
- Heribert von Feilitzsch, 'Felix A. Sommerfeld: Spymaster in Mexico, 1908 to 1914 Henselstone Verlag LLC, Amissville, Virginia, 2012
