= Sex magic =

Magic involving sexual activity

Sex magic (sometimes spelled sex magick) is any type of sexual activity used in magical, ritualistic or otherwise religious and spiritual pursuits. One practice of sex magic is using sexual arousal or orgasm with visualization of a desired result. A premise posited by sex magicians is the concept that sexual energy is a potent force that can be harnessed to transcend one's normally perceived reality.

== Paschal Beverly Randolph ==
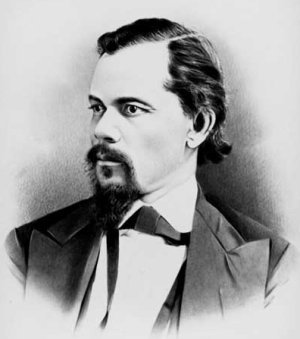
Paschal Beverly Randolph

The earliest known practical teachings of sex magic in the Western world come from 19th-century American occultist Paschal Beverly Randolph (1825–1875). Son of a wealthy Virginian father and a slave mother, he was a well-known spiritualist who was greatly influenced by the work of English Rosicrucian and scholar of phallicism, Hargrave Jennings.

Randolph developed one of the most influential systems of sex magic. As per him, the moment when one reaches orgasm is the most intense and the most powerful experience a human can have in life, for in that moment the soul suddenly opens to the divine realm and the breath of God is infused. He said, "True sex-power is God-power". As such, the power of orgasm can be used by a man and woman for various gains, both worldly and spiritual. He wrote thus in The Mysteries of Eulis:

Success in any case requires the adjuvancy of a superior woman. THIS IS THE LAW! A harlot or low woman is useless for all such lofty and holy purposes ... The woman shall not be one who accepts rewards for compliance; nor a virgin; or under eighteen years of age; or another's wife; yet must be one who hath known man and who has been and still is capable of intense mental, volitional and affectionate energy, combined with perfect sexive and orgasmal ability; for it requires a double crisis to succeed... The entire mystery can be given in very few words, and they are: An upper room; absolute personal, mental, and moral cleanliness both of the man and wife. An observance of the law just cited during the entire term of the experiment – 49 days. Formulate the desire and keep it in mind during the whole period and especially when making the nuptive prayer, during which no word may be spoken, but the thing desired be strongly thought...

Randolph insisted that for the magic to be effective and prayers be fulfilled, both the partners involved in should achieve orgasm at the same moment. His teachings were later passed on to numerous secret societies in Europe, the most notable being Ordo Templi Orientis or O.T.O. founded by Carl Kellner and Theodor Reuss.

== Carl Kellner ==
Carl Kellner (1851–1905), the founder of Ordo Templi Orientis (O.T.O.), said he had learned the techniques of sex magic from three adepts in this art. Beginning in 1904, references to these secrets, Kellner, and the O.T.O. began appearing in "an obscure German masonic periodical called Oriflamme." In 1912, the editors of Oriflamme announced:

Our order possesses the key which opens up all Masonic and Hermetic secrets, namely, the teachings of sexual magic, and this teaching explains, without exception, all the secrets of Freemasonry and all systems of religion.

== Ida Craddock ==
In the latter part of the 19th century, sexual reformer Ida Craddock (1857–1902) published several works dealing with sacred sexuality, most notably Heavenly Bridegrooms and Psychic Wedlock. Aleister Crowley reviewed Heavenly Bridegrooms in the pages of his journal The Equinox, stating that it was:

...one of the most remarkable human documents ever produced, and it should certainly find a regular publisher in book form. The authoress of the MS. claims that she was the wife of an angel. She expounds at the greatest length the philosophy connected with this thesis. Her learning is enormous.

...This book is of incalculable value to every student of occult matters. No Magick library is complete without it.

Sexual techniques from Craddock's Psychic Wedlock were later reproduced in Sex Magick by O.T.O. initiate Louis T. Culling, a disciple of C. F. Russell.

== Aleister Crowley ==
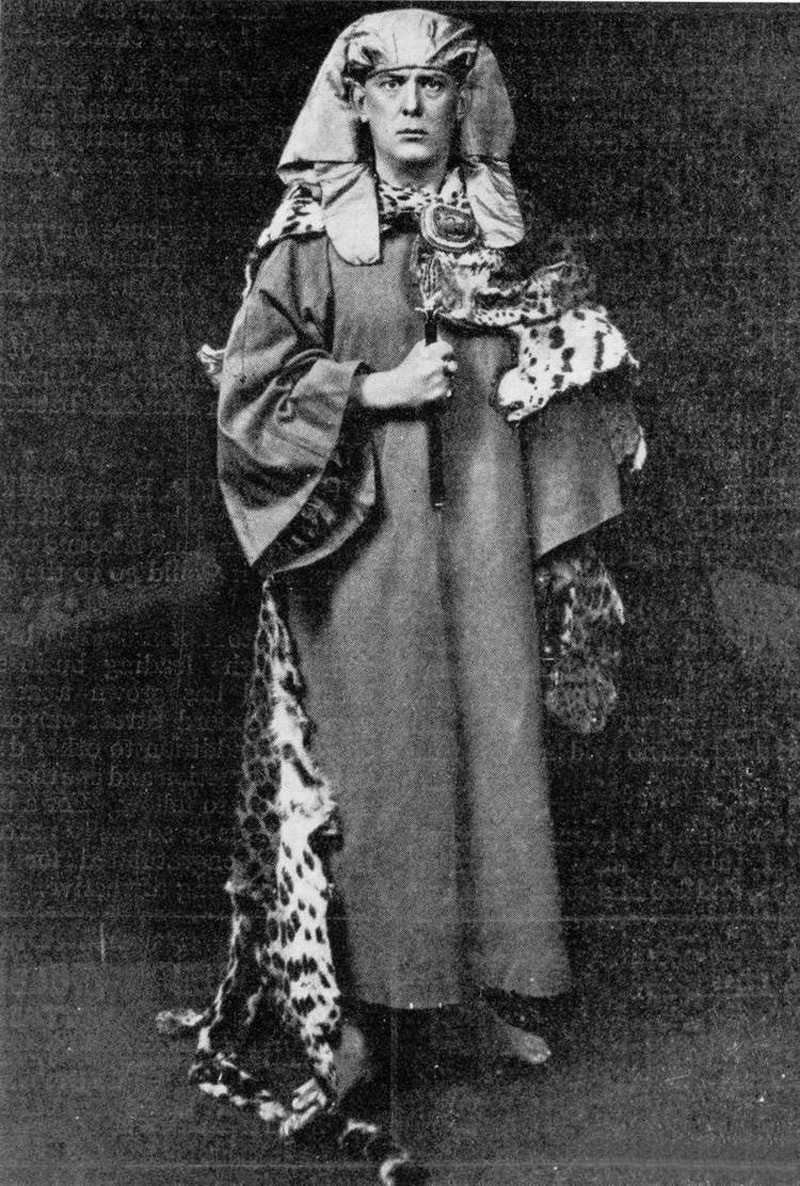
Crowley in Golden Dawn garb

The Sexual act is a sacrament of will. To profane it is the greatest offense. All true expression of it is lawful; all suppression or distortion of it is contrary to the law of liberty. — Aleister Crowley

Aleister Crowley (1875–1947) became involved with Theodor Reuss and Ordo Templi Orientis following the publication of The Book of Lies between 1912 and 1913. According to Crowley's account, Reuss approached him and accused him of having revealed the innermost (sexual) secret of O.T.O. in one of the cryptic chapters of this book. When it became clear to Reuss that Crowley had done so unintentionally, he initiated Crowley into the IX° (ninth degree) of O.T.O. and appointed him "Sovereign Grand Master General of Ireland, Iona and all the Britains." (Note: Crowley (1980), p. 6: "Shortly after publication [of the Book of Lies], the O.H.O. (Outer Head of the O.T.O.) came to me... He said that since I was acquainted with the supreme secret of the Order, I must be allowed the IX {degree} and obligated in regard to it. I protested that I knew no such secret. He said 'But you have printed it in the plainest language'. I said that I could not have done so because I did not know it. He went to the bookshelves; taking out a copy of The Book of Lies, he pointed to a passage... It instantly flashed upon me. The entire symbolism not only of Free Masonry but of many other traditions blazed upon my spiritual vision. From that moment the O.T.O. assumed its proper importance in my mind. I understood that I held in my hands the key to the future progress of humanity...")

While the O.T.O. included, from its inception, the teaching of sex magick in the highest degrees of the Order, when Crowley became head of the Order, he expanded on these teachings and associated them with different degrees as follows:

- VIII°: masturbatory or autosexual magical techniques were taught, referred as the Lesser Work of Sol
- IX°: heterosexual magical techniques were taught
- XI°: anal intercourse magical techniques were taught.

Hugh Urban, professor of Comparative Religion at Ohio State University, noted Crowley's emphasis on sex as "the supreme magical power." According to Crowley:

Mankind must learn that the sexual instinct is ... ennobling. The shocking evils which we all deplore are principally due to the perversions produced by suppressions. The feeling that it's shameful and the sense of sin cause concealment, which is ignoble and internal conflict which creates distortion, neurosis, and ends in explosion. We deliberately produce an [abscess] and wonder why it is full of pus, why it hurts, why it bursts in stench and corruption. The Book of the Law solves the sexual problem completely. Each individual has an absolute right to satisfy his sexual instinct as is physiologically proper for him. The one injunction is to treat all such acts as sacraments. One should not eat as the brutes, but in order to enable one to do one's will. The same applies to sex. We must use every faculty to further the one object of our existence.

Crowley wrote extensively on the topic of sex magick. Some of these works were published and made available to the general public, others were secret and could only be obtained by initiates of Ordo Templi Orientis.

- Liber IAO – IAO. Sexual Magick. Gives three methods of attainment through a willed series of thoughts. The active form of Liber CCCXLV.
- De Nuptis Secretis Deorum Cum Hominibus – Sexual magick
- Liber Stellae Rubeae – According to Crowley, a secret ritual of Apep, the heart of IAO-OAI, delivered unto V.V.V.V.V. for his use in a certain matter of The Book of the Law (Liber AL vel Legis). Sexual Magick veiled in symbolism.
- Liber Agape vel C vel Azoth – The Book of the Unveiling of the Sangraal wherein it is spoken of the Wine of the Sabbath of the Adepts. Secret instructions of the ninth degree of the O.T.O. (Sex Magick)
- Liber Cheth vel Vallum Abiegni – A perfect account of the task of the Exempt Adept considered under the symbols of a particular plane, not the intellectual. Sexual magick veiled in symbolism.
- Liber A'ash vel Capricorni Pneumatici – Analyzes the nature of the creative magical force in man, explains how to awaken it, how to use it and indicates the general as well as the particular objects to be gained thereby. Sexual magick heavily veiled in symbolism.
- The Book of Lies – includes some techniques in symbolic language, including extended mutual oral sex (Chapter 69) while intoxicated on hashish.
- The Paris Working – A record of homosexual magick operations.
- Energized Enthusiasm – An essay developing the idea of creativity as a sexual phenomenon. Specially adapted to the task of attainment of control of the Body of Light, development of intuition, and Hatha yoga.

== Maria de Naglowska ==
Maria de Naglowska (1883–1936) was a Russian occultist, mystic, author and journalist who wrote and taught about ritualistic sex magic practices while also being linked with the Parisian surrealist movement. She established and led an occult society known as the Confrérie de la Flèche d'or (Brotherhood of the Golden Arrow) in Paris from 1932 to 1935. In 1931, she compiled, translated and published in French a collection of published and unpublished writings by American occultist Paschal Beverly Randolph on the subject of sexual magic and magic mirrors. Her translation and publication of Randolph's previously little-known ideas and teachings was the source of Randolph's subsequent influence in European magic. She augmented the text with some of his oral teachings. The following year, she published a semi-autobiographical novella, Le Rite sacré de l'amour magique (The Sacred Ritual of Magical Love.)

Later that year, she also published La Lumière du sexe (The Light of Sex), a mystic treatise and guide to sexual ritual that was required reading for those seeking to be initiated into the Brotherhood of the Golden Arrow. Her later book on advanced sexual magic practices, Le Mystère de la pendaison (The Hanging Mystery) details her advanced teachings on the Third Term of the Trinity and the spiritually transformation power of sex, and the practice of erotic ritual hanging and other sensory deprivation practices. Beyond occult subjects, Naglowska also influenced the surrealist art movement. The Lexique succinct de l'érotisme in the catalog of the 1959 International Surrealist Exhibition in Paris noted her important influence. Surrealist Sarane Alexandrian wrote a detailed account of her life.

== Samael Aun Weor ==
The crux of Samael Aun Weor's (1917–1977) teachings is what he calls "white sexual magic", the paramount tenet of which is to conclude the act without orgasm or ejaculation from either the man or woman. Thus, instead of the sexual energy being released in a spasm, this energy undergoes sexual transmutation via willpower and the sacrifice of desire. According to Aun Weor, the magnetic induction produced by crossing the active (phallus) and passive (uterus) creative organs causes lunar, solar and akashic currents to flow through the Brahmanic cord (the ida, pingala and sushumna nadis respectively) of the couple. He says that this current then provides an active connection between the magnetic center at the root of the nose (the pineal gland, Ajna chakra) and the solar and lunar principles located within the seminal system at the muladhara chakra. The transmuted energy, through willpower, is populated by what Aun Weor says are "billions of christic atoms" that when rising meet the pure akasa of the triune Brahmanic cord, igniting it, and through many years of work this causes the ascent of the kundalini through the thirty-three chambers or degrees of the spinal medulla.

Aun Weor says that along with the ascent of the kundalini, the crystallization of the "Solar Bodies" are formed due to the transmutation which occurs through white sexual magic. He says that the solar bodies are the four aspects of the sacred merkabah of Arcanum Seven. In sum, Aun Weor describes the solar bodies as the christic vehicles of emotion, mind and will.

Aun Weor says that because sexuality is both a creator and destroyer, à la Shiva-Shakti, through sexual magic he indicates that one can eliminate any previously comprehended psychological defect. In other words, he says that through sexual magic the radical removal of the egocentric vehicles can be achieved – which he says are the animalistic or inferior vehicles of emotion, mind, and will related to one's evolutive animal transmigrations prior to reaching the humanoid state. Thus, through the death of the ego and the birth of the solar bodies, Aun Weor states that one can be elevated to the angelic state and beyond.

Aun Weor also states that when the orgasm is reached the christic atoms are expelled and replaced, via genital orgasmic contraction, with what he believed were impure "atoms" of fornication. When, through willpower the akashic current meets the "atoms of fornication", he said, that instead of rising the energy is rejected by the divine triad (atman-buddhi-manas) and is forced downward into the atomic infernos of the human being, forming the "tail of satan", (the kundabuffer, or negatively polarized kundalini). He says that the repetition of orgasm over time divorces the divine triad from the inferior "quaternary" (physical, vital, astral and mental bodies) through the severing of the antakarana. This brings about, according to Aun Weor, "the fallen Bodhisattva", "the Fall of Lucifer" as described by the author Dante, or what amounts to the same thing: the Fall of Man. He refers to any type of sexual magic that uses the orgasm for spiritual or magical purposes as "black sexual magic", and he believed that those who perform it are black magicians who acquire negative powers.

== See also ==
- Babalon – Goddess in Thelema
- Ceremonial magic – Variety of rituals of magic
- Chaos magic – Belief system
- Charge of the Goddess – Inspirational text often used in the Wiccan religion
- Eroto-comatose lucidity – Sex magic technique
- Great Rite – Wiccan ritual
- History of erotic depictions
- Hieros gamos – Divine marriage
- Karezza – Sexual practice
- Karmamudrā – Vajrayana Buddhist practice
- Maithuna – Sanskrit term used in Tantra most often translated as "sexual union"
- Neotantra – Western interpretation of Tantra
- Religion and sexuality
- Sacred prostitution – Sexual rite performed in the context of religious worship
- Sexuality in Christian demonology
- Spirit spouse – Aspect of shamanism
- Tantra – Esoteric traditions of Hinduism and Buddhism
- Taoist sexual practices – Religious sexual practices
- Tibetan tantric practice – Tantric practices in Tibetan Buddhism
- Vajrayana – Mahayana Buddhist tantric tradition
- Yab-Yum – Symbol in Tibetan Buddhist art

== Notes and references ==
=== Works cited ===
Primary sources

- Aun Weor, Samael (2001) [1961]. The Perfect Matrimony. Glorian Publishing. ISBN 0-9742755-0-6.
- Aun Weor, Samael (2003) [1971]. The Mystery of the Golden Blossom. Glorian Publishing. ISBN 0-9742755-2-2.
- Aun Weor, Samael (2003b) [1978]. The Initiatic Path in the Arcana of Tarot and Kabbalah. Glorian Publishing. ISBN 0-9742755-1-4.
- Aun Weor, Samael (2007) [1953]. Igneous Rose: The Magic, Sexual Energy, and Mind of the Inner Buddha. Glorian Publishing. ISBN 978-1934206263.
- Aun Weor, Samael (2008) [1967]. The Doomed Aryan Race: Gnosis, Tantra, and the End of the Age. Glorian Publishing. ISBN 978-1934206300.
- Crowley, Aleister (1970). The Confessions of Aleister Crowley. New York: Farrar Straus & Giroux. ISBN 0-8090-3591-X.
- Crowley, Aleister (1980). The Book of Lies. Weiser Books. ISBN 978-0877285168.
- Crowley, Aleister (1992) [1919]. "The Blue Equinox". The Equinox. III (1). York Beach, ME: Samuel Weiser. ISBN 0-87728-210-2.
- Crowley, Aleister (1996). Skinner, Stephen (ed.). The Magical Diaries of Aleister Crowley: Tunisia 1923. Samuel Weiser. ISBN 0-87728-856-9.
- Culling, Louis T. (1986). Sex Magick. St. Paul, MN: Llewellyn Publications. ISBN 0875421105.
- Randolph, Paschal Beverly (1996). The Mysteries of Eulis. Appendix B in Deveney (1996), pp. 327–342.

Secondary sources

- Alexandrian, Sarane (1977). Les Libérateurs de l'amour. Éditions du Seuil. ISBN 2020045443.
- Deveney, JP, ed. (1996). Paschal Beverly Randolph: A Nineteenth-Century Black American Spiritualist, Rosicrucian, and Sex Magician. Albany, NY: State University of New York Press. ISBN 978-0-7914-3120-7.
- King, Francis (2012). Megatherion: The Magickal World of Aleister Crowley. Creation Books. ISBN 978-1840681802.
- Rosemont, Penelope (1998). Surrealist Women: An International Anthology. Athlone Press. ISBN 978-0485300888.
- Urban, Hugh (2003). "Unleashing the Beast: Aleister Crowley, Tantra, and Sex Magic in Late Victorian England". Esoterica. V: 138–192 – via Esoteric.msu.edu.
- Urban, H. B. (2003b). "The Power of the Impure: Transgression, Violence and Secrecy in Bengali Śākta Tantra and Modern Western Magic". Numen. 50 (3): 269–308. doi:10.1163/156852703322192419. JSTOR 3270489.
- Urban, Hugh B. (September 2004). "Magia Sexualis: Sex, Secrecy, and Liberation in Modern Western Esotericism". Journal of the American Academy of Religion. 72 (3): 695–731. doi:10.1093/jaarel/lfh064. PMID 20681097.
- Versluis, Arthur (2005). Gutierrez, Cathy (ed.). The Occult in Nineteenth Century America. Aurora, CO: The Davies Group. ISBN 1-888570-83-0.
