= Aeon of Horus =

Era of time in the religion of Thelema

In the esoteric philosophy of Thelema, the Aeon of Horus, which began in 1904, is the name of the current astrological age, one of twelve in the Great Year. This Aeon is marked by a significant shift in spiritual and societal paradigms, emphasizing self-realization, individualism, and the pursuit of one's True Will. The child god Horus symbolizes this era, representing a break from past dogmas and the dawn of a new age of enlightenment and spiritual awakening.

The Aeon card in the Thoth Tarot deck, designed by Crowley and painted by Lady Frieda Harris, represents the Aeon of Horus. The card, traditionally known as "Judgement" in other decks, symbolizes the transformative and revelatory nature of this new aeon. It depicts Horus and Hoor-paar-kraat, reflecting the themes of rebirth, transformation, and the dawning of a new era of consciousness and spiritual awakening in Thelemic philosophy.

== Description by Crowley ==
The modern Aeon of Horus is portrayed as a time of self-realization as well as a growing interest in all things spiritual, and is considered to be dominated by the principle of the child. The Word of its Law is Thelema (will), which is complemented by Agape (love), and its formula is Abrahadabra. Individuality and finding the individual's True Will are the dominant aspects; its formula is that of growth, in consciousness and love, toward self-realization. Concerning the Aeon of Horus, Crowley wrote:

... the crowned and conquering child, who dieth not, nor is reborn, but goeth radiant ever upon His Way. Even so goeth the Sun: for as it is now known that night is but the shadow of the Earth, so Death is but the shadow of the Body, that veileth his Light from its bearer.

And also, in his Little Essays Toward Truth:

The Aeon of Horus is here: and its first flower may well be this: that, freed of the obsession of the doom of the Ego in Death, and of the limitation of the Mind by Reason, the best men again set out with eager eyes upon the Path of the Wise, the mountain track of the goat, and then the untrodden Ridge, that leads to the ice-gleaming pinnacles of Mastery!

Sometimes Crowley compared the Word of Horus with other formulas, whose reigns appear to overlap with the Aeon of Osiris and/or Isis. From his The Confessions of Aleister Crowley:

There are many magical teachers but in recorded history we have scarcely had a dozen Magi in the technical sense of the word. They may be recognized by the fact that their message may be formulated as a single word, which word must be such that it overturns all existing beliefs and codes. We may take as instances the Word of Buddha-Anatta (absence of an atman or soul), which laid its axe to the root of Hindu cosmology, theology and psychology, and incidentally knocked away the foundation of the caste system; and indeed of all accepted morality. Mohammed, again, with the single word Allah, did the same thing with polytheisms, patently pagan or camouflaged as Christian, of his period.

Similarly, Aiwass, uttering the word Thelema (with all its implications), destroys completely the formula of the Dying God. Thelema implies not merely a new religion, but a new cosmology, a new philosophy, a new ethics. It co-ordinates the disconnected discoveries of science, from physics to psychology, into a coherent and consistent system.

== Key characteristics ==
=== Self-realization and True Will ===
The primary focus of the Aeon of Horus is the discovery and fulfillment of one's True Will. This concept is central to Thelema, where each individual is encouraged to find and follow their unique path in life. Aleister Crowley's reception of The Book of the Law in 1904 marked the beginning of this aeon, with the central tenet being "Do what thou wilt shall be the whole of the Law." Israel Regardie viewed Crowley's revelation of the aeon as a monumental shift towards new spiritual and psychological paradigms, emphasizing individual spiritual enlightenment and personal responsibility. Kenneth Grant also highlights this transformative power, noting how the Aeon of Horus calls individuals to embrace their True Will and transcend old paradigms.

=== Individualism and spiritual awakening ===
The Aeon of Horus emphasizes personal freedom and the breaking away from authoritarian structures that characterized the previous aeons. This era is about embracing one's inner divinity and achieving spiritual enlightenment. Lon Milo DuQuette explains that the Aeon of Horus is about the growth of individual consciousness and the realization of one's spiritual potential. Kenneth Grant further elaborates on this idea, noting how the symbolism of Horus reflects a break from the constraints of previous aeons and heralds a new era of spiritual liberation. J. Daniel Gunther interprets the Aeon as a period where humanity is poised for significant spiritual evolution, driven by the awakening of individual consciousness.

=== The child god symbolism ===
Horus, the child god, represents innocence, new beginnings, and the potential for growth. This symbolism is reflected in the Thelemic emphasis on exploring new spiritual paths and understanding. Kenneth Grant discusses the symbolism of Horus as the crowned and conquering child, embodying the qualities of renewal and triumph over past limitations. Richard Kaczynski offers insights into how Crowley's experiences and writings shaped the Aeon of Horus and its principles, detailing the profound impact of Crowley's work on modern esoteric thought.

== Relationship with the Age of Aquarius ==
Lon Milo DuQuette commented on the connection between the Aeon of Horus and the Age of Aquarius, stating,

Yes, [the Aeon of Horus] is coincidental to what astrologers and songwriters call the Age of Aquarius and what millions of others refer to simply as the New Age. But it would be a mistake to view this new aeon simply as another tick on a great cosmic clock. The Age of Aquarius, profoundly significant as it is, is only one aspect of a far greater new spiritual age.

Christopher Partridge, in The Re-Enchantment of the West, examines the rise of New Age spirituality and its intersections with occult traditions, including Thelema. He notes that the New Age movement, often associated with the Age of Aquarius, draws upon concepts introduced by Crowley and his contemporaries. Partridge points out that the New Age's emphasis on individual spiritual experience and global transformation parallels the revolutionary spirit of the Aeon of Horus, as proclaimed by Crowley.

Richard Kaczynski, in Perdurabo: The Life of Aleister Crowley, discusses how Crowley's proclamation of the Aeon of Horus aligns with broader cultural shifts that some associate with the Age of Aquarius. He explores the synchronicity between Crowley's work and the evolving spiritual landscape of the 20th century, highlighting how Crowley's ideas resonate with the themes of personal liberation and spiritual transformation that characterize the Age of Aquarius.

== Timekeeping ==
In the Aeon of Horus, Thelemites often use a unique system of dating that incorporates elements of Tarot, astrology, and Thelemic principles. This system aligns significant events and periods with corresponding Tarot trumps and the positions of the Sun and Moon in the zodiac.

=== Thelemic year cycles and representation ===
The Thelemic calendar begins in 1904, the year in which Crowley received The Book of the Law and inaugurated the Aeon of Horus. Each year in the Thelemic calendar is represented by a Tarot trump. This association is based on a cycle that repeats every 22 years, corresponding to the 22 Major Arcana cards of the Tarot. The years are divided into "docosades" of 22 years each, denoted by Roman numerals. For example, the year 1947 (the year of Crowley's death) corresponds to "The Universe" (XXI), as 1947 - 1904 gives 43, and dividing 43 by 22 leaves a remainder of 21, corresponding to the 21st card, "The Universe" (XXI). Thus, the year 1947 would be written as Anno Ixxi, where I indicates the second docosade (The Magician) and xxi is the year within that docosade.

=== Sun and moon sign ===
Thelemic timekeeping also considers the astrological positions of the Sun and Moon. For instance, on December 1, 1947, at the time of Crowley's death, the Sun was in Sagittarius (♐) at 8°, and the Moon was in Cancer (♋) at 20°.

=== Recording time in a magical record ===
The Magician might date their magical record entries at specific times of day, in line with the practices outlined in Liber Resh vel Helios. This practice involves saluting the Sun at dawn, noon, sunset, and midnight, thereby making entries that are aligned with these solar positions.

=== Example of Thelemic date ===
The date of Aleister Crowley's death, December 1, 1947, in Thelemic terms could be expressed as: Dies Lunae, Anno Ixxi, ☉ in 8° ♐, ☽ in 20° ♋

This interpretation of Anno Ixxi, "The Completion of the Magician", aligns with the symbolism of the Tarot and the progress through the docosades.

== See also ==
- Axial precession – Change of rotational axis in an astronomical body
