= Judgement (tarot card) =

Tarot card of the Major Arcana

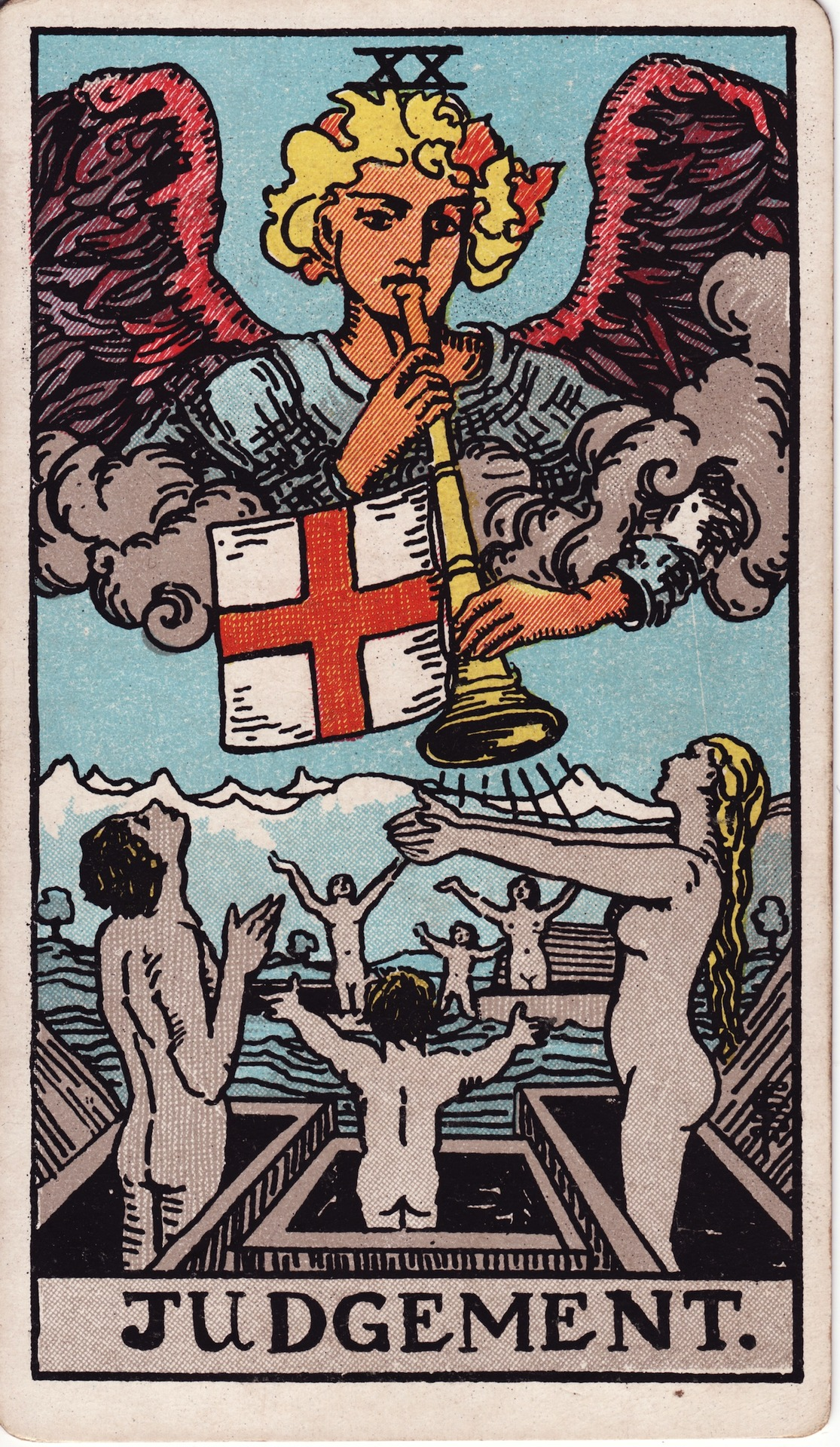
The Judgment (XX) from the Rider–Waite tarot deck

Judgement (XX), or in some decks spelled Judgment, is a tarot card, part of the Major Arcana suit usually comprising 22 cards.

== Description ==
The traditional scene is modeled after Christian imagery of the Resurrection and Last Judgment. An angel is depicted among the clouds blowing a great trumpet, from which hangs the flag of St. George, which references the 1 Corinthians 15. A group of resurrected people (man, woman, and child) of sallow complexion stand, arms spread, looking up at the angel in awe. The Sleeping Dead are emerging from crypts or graves, calling back to the Revelation 20, where the sea gives up its dead. There are snow-covered mountains in the background indicating a winter theme, similar to The Hermit, as a symbolical ending.

== Card meanings ==
The Judgement card appears near the end of the Major Arcana. It suggests themes of resurrection, spiritual awakening, and epiphany. The card may imply that a judgment has been made, but, in contrast to the Justice card, which corresponds to judgements being made in relation to personal experience, the Judgement card corresponds with greater, divine forces summoning an awareness on the "true nature of existence."

According to A. E. Waite's 1910 book Pictorial Key to the Tarot, the Judgement card is associated with:

Change of position, renewal, outcome. Another account specifies total loss though lawsuit. Reversed: Weakness, pusillanimity, simplicity; also deliberation, decision, sentence.

Rachel Pollack writes:

In the divinatory readings the card of Judgement carries a special significance. Whatever else is going on around you, there is a push, a call from within, to make some important change. The change can refer to something mundane and immediate, or to an entire shift in the way a person looks at life — depending on the other cards, and the subject of the reading. The important thing is the call. In effect, the person has already changed; the old situations, the old self, have already died. It is simply a matter of recognizing it.

Tarot author Benebell Wen writes:

[Judgement] indicates a change in the Seeker's personal consciousness, an important realization that will be a game-changer for the Seeker. An important life lesson will be learned. Events currently happening in the Seeker's life will be the catalyst to a person awakening. There may also be a literal sense of judgement. All evidence has been made available to the Seeker and the Seeker has rendered his or her judgement. It does not end there, however. The judgement that the Seeker has made is going to compel an important realization or epiphany in the Seeker. Upright, this card indicates that the judgement is correct and will bring an awakening or epiphany in the Seeker that is spiritually fulfilling.

The card can be assigned the following key words or associations:

- Judgement
- Rebirth
- Inner-calling
- Awakening
- Absolution
- Karma
- Causality
- Second chance

== Alternative decks ==
In Aleister Crowley's Thoth Tarot, Judgement is referred to as The Aeon and includes pictorial representations of Nuit, Hadit and Ra-Hoor-Khuit and Harpocrates.

== See also ==
- Angels in art
