= New Aeon =

New Aeon may refer to:

- Aeon of Horus in Thelema
- Messianic Age, in Abrahamic religions
- new Aeon, an album by Yae Fujimoto
- New Age
