= Abrahadabra =

Magical formula

Abrahadabra is a significant word within Thelema, a religion founded by Aleister Crowley early in the 20th century. Crowley first proposed this respelling of the word "Abracadabra" in January 1901 and included it in the central sacred text of Thelema, The Book of the Law, the manuscript of which was written in April 1904. Thelemites believe Abrahadabra represents the Great Work accomplished—the union of the microcosm (individual) and the macrocosm (universe) and consider it the key to the Aeon of Horus and a word of power that symbolizes the realization of True Will.

== Origin and symbolism ==
The word is derived from the older magic word "Abracadabra". Crowley's adaptation the word as part of his broader practice of recontextualizing ancient symbols and practices within his occult framework. Crowley wrote in his essay "Gematria" that he changed the spelling to include 'H' for qabalistic reasons.

"Abrahadabra" consists of 11 letters, a significant number in Thelema. The number 11 represents the dynamic interaction between the microcosm and the macrocosm, bridging the infinite, represented by Hadit and the finite, represented by Nuit. Crowley referred to it as embodying the concept of unity through diversity.

The Golden Dawn, in their Neophyte ritual, linked the H in the spelling with breath, life, (Note: Regardie (1989), p. 118: "Hiero: Is there any peculiarity in these names? Hierus: They all commence with the letter 'H'. Hiero: Of what is this letter a symbol? Hierus: Of life; because this letter 'H' is our mode of representing the ancient Greek aspirate or breathing, and Breath is the evidence of Life.) and the god Horus. (Note: Regardie (1989) links Horus with the letter 'H' on p. 345, and with the Hierus, p. 338, 352.)

== Qabalah and gematria ==
Crowley emphasized the numerological and Qabalistic significance of "Abrahadabra." According to Crowley, the numerical value of "Abrahadabra" is 418, which corresponds to the Hebrew letter "Cheth", meaning "fence" or "enclosure", symbolizing containment and protection, which Thelemites believe is represented by The Chariot card in the Tarot.

The single letter cheth (ח) itself has a numerical value of 8, but when the word "cheth" is spelled out fully (חֵית) the numerical total of that word is 418 (a method of Hebrew numerology called otiot be-milui, "letters-in-full").

== Use in Thelema ==
The practice of using "Abrahadabra" in meditations and rituals is aimed at achieving one's True Will. This concept is central to Thelema, emphasizing that each individual has a unique purpose or path in life, which "Abrahadabra" helps to realize. Through repeated use and contemplation of the word, practitioners seek to align their actions and intentions with their innermost desires and cosmic purpose.

"Abrahadabra" is often used in Thelemic rituals and invocations to signify the accomplishment of the Great Work. It serves as a word of invocation, believed to draw upon the energies of the Aeon of Horus and aligning the practitioner with their True Will. The word appears repeatedly in the 1904 invocation of Horus that preceded the writing of Liber Legis and led to the founding of Thelema.

It sees use in affirmations, protective spells, and as a focus in rituals aimed at materializing specific intentions. Practitioners reinforce their spiritual practice through invoking the word. It is believed the word acts as a bridge between the spiritual and physical realms, facilitating the manifestation of higher ideals in tangible form.

== In Thelemite Tarot ==
"Abrahadabra" is extensively discussed in The Book of Thoth, where Crowley links it to the Thoth Tarot and magic.

In Tarot as practiced in Thelema, "Abrahadabra" is associated with five cards in the Major Arcana: The Fool (A), The Magician (B), The Sun (R), The Hierophant (H), and The Empress (D). The word as a whole is represented by The Chariot. (Note: Due to its value being the same as the sum of the letters of the Hebrew letter name (Cheth) attributed to this card.)

== Psychological and spiritual impact ==
Adherents believe practices involving "Abrahadabra" lead to experiences of heightened consciousness, deep emotional release, and a stronger connection to one's inner self.

== See also ==
- Aleister Crowley bibliography
- Bornless Ritual – Ritual of Western ceremonial magic
- Holy Guardian Angel – Protective and tutelary angel
- Kether – First emanation in Kabbalah
