= Magical formula =

Words expressing a process in ceremonial magic

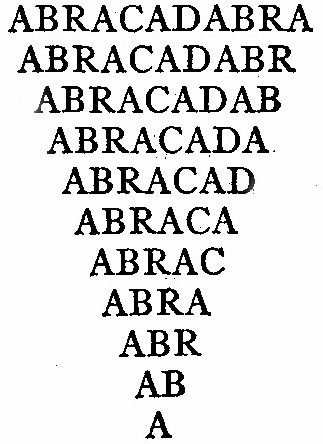
Classic magic words

In ceremonial magic, a magical formula or a word of power is a word that is believed to have specific supernatural effects. They are words whose meaning illustrates principles and degrees of understanding that are often difficult to relay using other forms of speech or writing. It is a concise means to communicate very abstract information through the medium of a word or phrase.

These words often have no intrinsic meaning in and of themselves. However, when deconstructed, each individual letter may refer to some universal concept found in the system in which the formula appears. Additionally, in grouping certain letters together one is able to display meaningful sequences that are considered to be of value to the spiritual system that utilizes them (e.g., spiritual hierarchies, historiographic data, or psychological stages).

A formula's potency is understood and made usable by the magician only through prolonged meditation on its levels of meaning. Once these have been internalized by the magician, that person can then utilize the formula to maximum effect.

Since most of these permutative arrangements have their origin in Hermetic Qabalah, many of the formulae listed below can be best understood by using various techniques of Hebrew Kabbalah such as gematria (or isopsephy), temurah, and notariqon to analyze them.

== Formulae ==
- Abracadabra. A common incantation used in ancient times as a cure for fevers and inflammations.
- ABRAHADABRA. This formula was coined by occult writer Aleister Crowley, who described it as "the Word of the Aeon, which signifieth the Great Work accomplished."
- ABRAXAS.
- AGAPE. A Greek word meaning "the highest form of love, charity," which enumerated in Greek isopsephy equals 93.
- AGLA. A noṭariqōn (kabbalistic acronym) for אַתָּה גִּבּוֹר לְעוֹלָם אֲדֹנָי ʾAtā gībōr ləʿōlām ʾĂḏōnāy, "Thou, O Lord, art mighty forever." It is said daily in the Gevurot, the second blessing of the Amidah, the central Jewish prayer.
- ALHIM. This is a transliterated Hebrew spelling of Elohim, a name of God—or "Gods" in this case, since the name is a masculine plural of a feminine noun. According to Crowley, it is a formula best used for consecration, since it "is the breath of benediction, yet so potent that it can give life to clay and light to darkness."
- ARARITA. According to Crowley, "a formula of the Macrocosm potent in certain very lofty operations of the Inmost Light."
- AUMGN. For both symbolic and numerological reasons, Aleister Crowley adapted Aum into a Thelemic magical formula, adding a silent 'g' (as in the word 'gnosis') and a nasal 'n' to the m to form the compound letter 'MGN'; the 'g' makes explicit the silence previously only implied by the terminal 'm' while the 'n' indicates nasal vocalisation connoting the breath of life and together they connote knowledge and generation. Om appears in this extended form throughout Crowley's magical and philosophical writings, notably appearing in his Gnostic Mass. Crowley discusses its symbolism briefly in section F of "Liber Samekh", and in detail in chapter 7 of Magick (Book 4).
- BABALON. A goddess in Thelema, whose name means "Gate of the Great God ON" according to Liber Samekh.
- HRILIU. used in Liber XV, The Gnostic Mass.
- IAO. Isis – Apophis – Osiris.
- IHVH. See YHVH.
- INRI. Hebrew: ינרי Yod, Nun, Resh, Yod. Hebrew translation of the Christian Jesus, King of the Jews formula, This magical formula represents the passing of life to death and Resurrection, Used in many rituals including the Rose Cross and the Ritual of the Hexagram by both O.T.O, A∴A∴, and the Hermetic Order of the Golden Dawn.
- IPSOS. the word of the Aeon of Ma'at, other spellings include IPSOSh, IPShOS, and IPShOSh from Liber Pennae Praenumbra by Nema.
- JAHBULON. According to Francis X. King in The Secret Rituals of the O.T.O., the word is used in two rituals of Ordo Templi Orientis: the Lodge of Perfection, in which the candidate receives the Fourth Degree (which is called Perfect Magician and Companion of the Holy Royal Arch of Enoch); and the Perfect Initiate (or Prince of Jerusalem) degree, which falls between the fourth and fifth degrees. King prints in his book the lyrics of a song that contains the word "Jahbulon."
- LAShTAL.
- LVX. Lit.= Latin word; Lux, or light. Part of the formula of the "analysis of the key word" used in the Adeptus Minor ritual of the Hermetic Order of the Golden Dawn, in which it is described in a ritualized manner, linking each letter with an Egyptian godform. Perhaps most popularized amongst the occult community at large by being included as the opening part to the Ritual of the Hexagram. See also Liber Resh.
- MEITHRAS.
- NOX. According to Crowley, "It is explained that this triad lives in Night, the Night of Pan, which is mystically called N.O.X., and this O is identified with the O in this word. N is the Tarot symbol, Death; and the X or Cross is the sign of the Phallus. NOX adds to 210, which symbolizes the reduction of duality to unity, and thence to negativity, and is thus a hieroglyph of the Great Work."
- ON. Looks like the Hebrew name for Heliopolis, from an original meaning "pillar" or "pillars". This city claimed to hold the Primeval Mound where Atum (sometimes identified with the mound) created the world. By Crowley's numeration, ON equals the Hebrew word Samekh (a prop or support), which also serves as the name of a Hebrew letter.
- THELEMA. Per Crowley, "Th - Babalon and the Beast conjoined; e - unto Nuit; L - the Work accomplished in Justice; E - the Holy Graal; M - the Water therein; a - the Babe in the Egg (Harpocrates on the Lotus)."
- VIAOV. Thelemic variation of IAO whose enumeration using gematria equals 93.
- VITRIOL. Visita Interiora Terrae Rectificando Invenies Occultem Lapidem ('Visit the interior parts of the earth: by rectification thou shalt find the hidden stone'). Ancient alchemical formula: Sulfuric acid was called "oil of vitriol" by medieval European alchemists because it was prepared by roasting "green vitriol" (iron(II) sulfate) in an iron retort. The first vague allusions to it appear in the works of Vincent of Beauvais, in the Compositum de Compositis ascribed to Saint Albertus Magnus, and in pseudo-Geber's Summa perfectionis (all thirteenth century AD).
- XNOUBIS.
- YHVH. The formula Tetragrammaton refers to the four-letter Hebrew name of God, Jehovah, or Yod, Heh, Vav, Heh (יהוה). These letters have been attributed to numerous four-part symbols, including the classic elements, cardinal directions, Tarot suits, and so on. The formula is often represented by the Father (Yod) joining with the Mother (Heh), to produce the Son (Vav) and the Daughter (Heh). Within Yoga it is possible to see this formula as describing the union of the subject and the object to produce the exalted state of mind and the resulting ecstasy.
- YHShVH, also known as the Pentagrammaton.

== See also ==
- Barbarous name – Meaningless word used in magic rituals
- Ceremonial magic – Variety of rituals of magic
- English Qaballa – English Qaballa system of James Lees
- Enochian – Occult language
- Goetia (magic) – Practice of supernatural beings and forces
- Great Work – Concept within the system of Thelema
- Mantra – Sacred utterance or sound used in meditation, often repeated
- Monas Hieroglyphica – 1564 book by John Dee about an esoteric symbol
- Renaissance magic – Magical science during the Renaissance
- Secret mantra – Mahayana Buddhist tantric tradition
- Spell – Formula intended to trigger a magical effect
- True name – Name of a thing or being that expresses its true nature
