= Stele of Ankh-ef-en-Khonsu =

Ancient Egyptian wooden stele

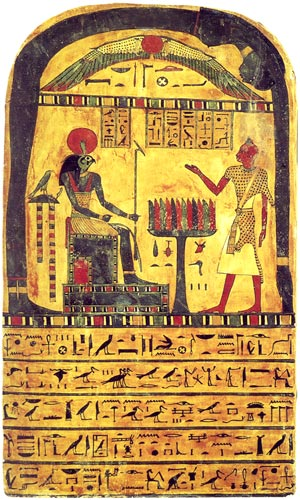
- Stele Cairo A 9422 (Bulaq 666), depicting Nut, Behdety as the winged solar disk, Ra-Horakhty seated on his throne, and the stele's owner, Ankh-ef-en-Khonsu i, standing on the right.
- Material: Wood
- Height: 51.5 cm
- Width: 31 cm
- Created: 680 – 70 BCE
- Discovered: c. 1856; Luxor, Ottoman Egypt
- Discovered by: Auguste Mariette
- Present location: Cairo, Cairo Governorate, Egypt

The Stele of Ankh-ef-en-Khonsu or Stele of Revealing is a painted, wooden offering stele located in Cairo, Egypt. It was discovered in 1858 by the French Egyptologist François Auguste Ferdinand Mariette at the mortuary temple of the 18th Dynasty Pharaoh Hatshepsut, located at Deir el-Bahari. It was originally made for the Montu-priest Ankh-ef-en-Khonsu i, and was discovered near his coffin ensemble of two sarcophagi and two anthropomorphic inner coffins. It dates to circa 680–70 BCE, the period of the late 25th Dynasty/early 26th Dynasty. Originally located in the former Boulaq Museum under inventory number 666, the stele was moved around 1902 to the newly opened Egyptian Museum of Cairo (inventory number A 9422; Temporary Register Number 25/12/24/11), where it remained till it was moved to the newly opened Grand Museum of Egypt, next to the Pyramids of Giza, where it is now located in Gallery 11.

The stele is made of wood and covered with a plaster gesso, which has been painted. It measures 51.5 centimeters high and 31 centimeters wide. On the front, Ankh-ef-en-Khonsu can be seen as a priest of Montu; he is presenting offerings to the falcon-headed god Re-Harakhty ("Re-Horus of the Two Horizons"), a syncretic form of the ancient Egyptian gods Ra and Horus, who is seated on a throne. The symbol of the west, the place of the Dead, is seen behind Re-Harakhty. Above the figures is a depiction of Nut, the sky goddess who stretches from horizon to horizon. Directly beneath her is the Winged Solar Disk, Horus of Behdet.

The stele is otherwise referred to as the "Stele of Revealing" and is a central element of the Western esoteric tradition and religious philosophy of Thelema, founded by the English occultist and ceremonial magician Aleister Crowley.

== Origins ==
The stele is a fairly typical example of a Theban offering stele from the late Third Intermediate Period, dating to the late 25th Dynasty/early 26th Dynasty. It was originally discovered in 1854 as part of a large burial of priests of Montu at Deir el-Bahari in Luxor, Ottoman Egypt, and included the coffin of the dedicant, Ankh-ef-en-Khonsu i.

== Text ==
The stele is painted on both faces with Egyptian texts, some of which are Chapter 91 of the Egyptian Book of the Dead, while the back of the stele records eleven lines of text from Chapters 30 and 2.

The text reads as follows.

=== Obverse ===

[A1] Beneath the Winged Solar Disk: (He of) Behdet, the Great God, Lord of Heaven

[A2–A3] Above Re-Harakhty: Re-Harakhty ("Re-Horus of the Two Horizons"), Chief of the Gods

[A4–A8] Above Ankh-ef-en-Khonsu: The Osiris, God's Servant of Montu, Lord of Waset, Opener of the Door-leaves of Heaven in the Most Select of Places (i.e., Karnak), Ankh-ef-en-Khonsu, <True of> Voice

[A9] Beneath the offering table: (thousands of) Bread and beer, cattle and fowl

[B1–B5] Main text: [B1] Words spoken by the Osiris (i.e., the deceased), God's Servant of Montu, Lord of Waset, Opener of the Door-leaves of Heaven in the Most Select of Places (i.e., Karnak), Ankh-ef-en-Khonsu, [B2] True of Voice: "O Exalted-one! may he be praised, Great of Manifestations, the great Ba whom [B3] the gods fear, and who appears on his great throne, make the path of the Ba, the Akh, and the Shadow, for I am equipped so that (I) might shine therein [B4] (as) an equipped-one. Make for me the path to the place in which Re, Atum, Khepri, and Hathor are therein." The Osiris, God's Servant of Montu, Lord of Waset, [B5] Ankh-ef-en-Khonsu, <True of> Voice, son of the like titled Ba-sa-en-Mut, borne of the Chantress of Amun-Re, Lady of the House, Ta-nesh<et>.

=== Reverse ===
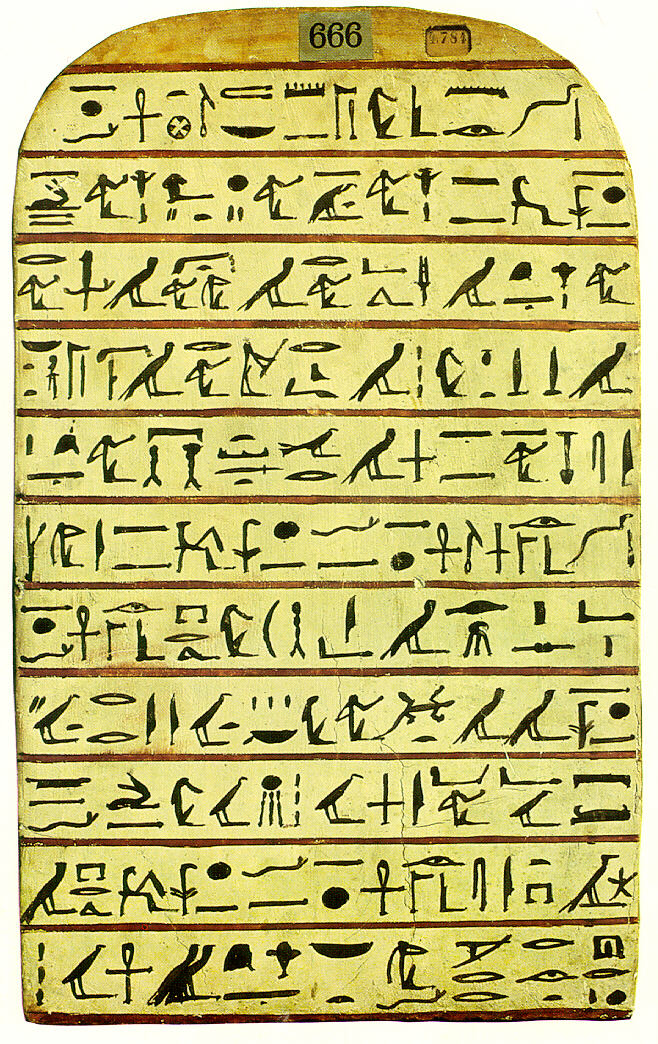
Reverse face of Cairo A 9422

[C1] Words spoken by the Osiris (i.e., the deceased), God's Servant of Montu, Lord of Waset, Ankh-ef-en- [C2] Khonsu, True of Voice: "(O) my heart of my mother [2 times], (O) my heart while I existed [C3] upon earth, do not stand against me as a witness, do not oppose me in [C4] in the tribunal, do not be hostile against me in the presence of the Great God, Lord of the West. [C5] Although I have united (myself) to the land (i.e. died) to the great western side of Heaven, may I flourish upon earth!" [C6] Words spoken by the Osiris, the Stolist of Waset, Ankh-ef-en-Khonsu, True of Voice: O (you who are) Unique [C7], who shines like the moon, the Osiris, Ankh-ef- [C8] en-Khonsu, goes forth from your multitudes, [C9] (O) deliverer of those who are within the sun-light, open for him [C10] the Netherworld, indeed, the Osiris, Ankh-ef-en-Khonsu who goes forth in [C11] day in order to do everything all that pleased him upon earth among the living-ones."

== Influence on Aleister Crowley ==
The designation of this object as the Stele of Revealing was given in April 1904 by the English occultist and ceremonial magician Aleister Crowley, in connection with The Book of the Law or Liber al vel Legis.

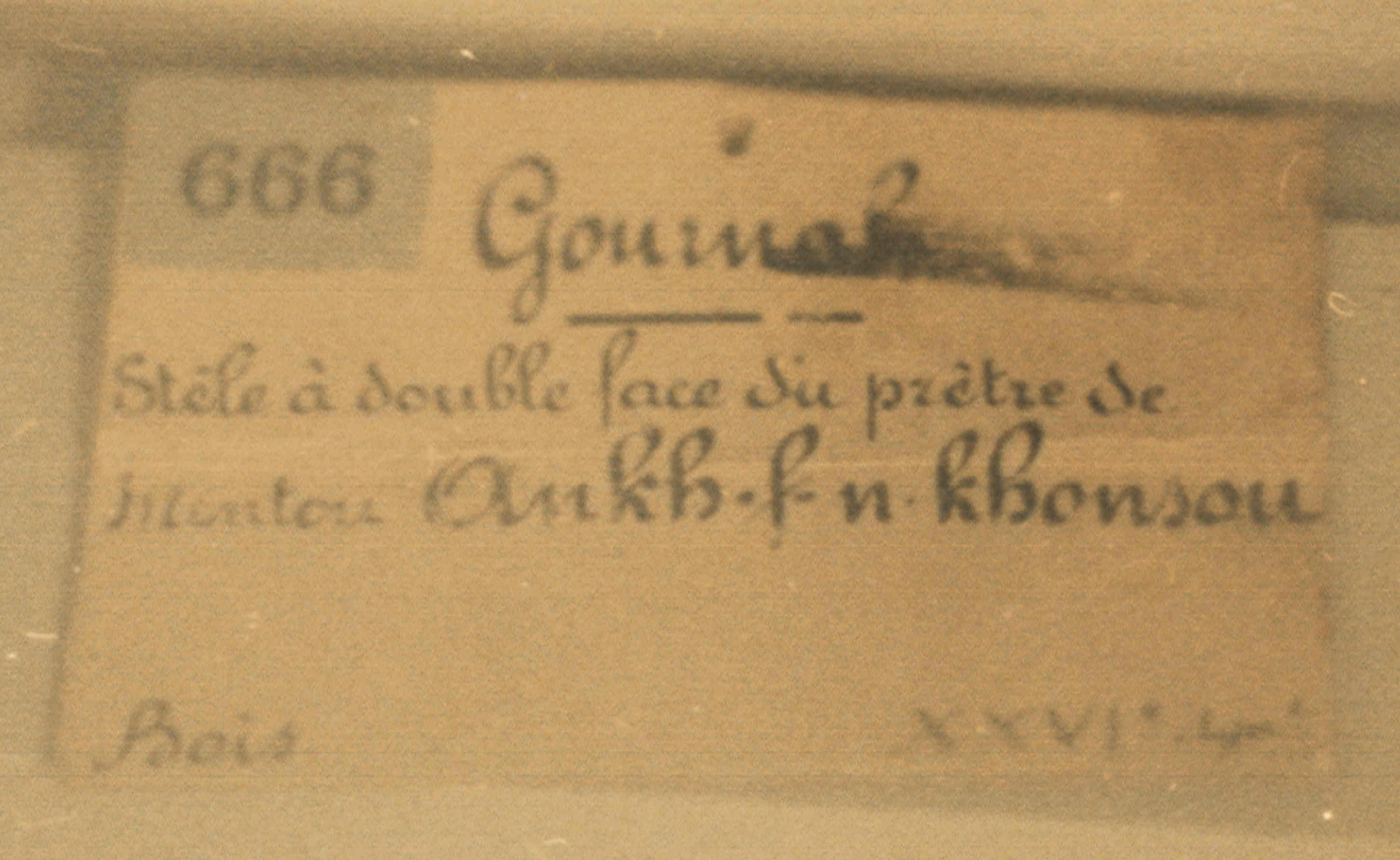
The Stele Cairo A 9422 was originally marked with inventory tag number 666 at the Bulaq Museum.

According to Crowley, his wife Rose had already reported a revelation from the ancient Egyptian god Horus through the non-physical entity named Aiwass, which is regarded as his messenger in Thelema. The couple went to the newly opened Egyptian Museum of Cairo (where the stele had been moved), to see if she could recognize Horus on Monday, March 21, 1904. Rose recognized an image of the god on this painted stele, which at the time bore the catalogue number 666, a number holding religious significance in Thelema.

According to Crowley, the stele depicts the three chief deities of Thelema: Nuit (Egyptian Nut), Hadit (Egyptian Behdety), and Ra-Hoor-Khuit (Egyptian Re-Harakhty ["Re-Horus of the Two Horizons"]). Crowley stated that he dined with Émile Brugsch, a German Egyptologist and curator of the Bulaq Museum, to discuss the stele in his charge and to arrange for a facsimile to be made. According to Crowley, Brugsch's French assistant curator translated the hieroglyphic text on the stele. In 1912, a second translation of the stele was later performed for Crowley by Alan Gardiner and Battiscombe Gunn.
