= Bornless Ritual =

Ritual of Western ceremonial magic

The Bornless Ritual, also known as the Preliminary Invocation of the Goetia or simply Preliminary Invocation, originates from the Graeco-Egyptian Papyri Graecae Magicae (PGM), a collection of ancient spells, invocations, and hymns compiled between the 2nd century BCE and the 5th century CE. Initially used for exorcism and healing, the ritual invokes the "Headless One". In modern times this entity has been reinterpreted as the "Bornless One" without beginning or end, who symbolizes the unity of the divine and the practitioner. Some interpretations suggest that the ritual may have connections with the Egyptian gods Osiris or Bes. Some have connected it with Set, which is unlikely. In the original title, "Stele of Jeu the Hieroglyphist in his letter" (see below), "Jeu" is a Greek permutation of YHWH. It is also called the "Headless Rite" or the "Invocation of the Bornless One".

Adapted by the Hermetic Order of the Golden Dawn and Aleister Crowley's A∴A∴, the ritual is employed to contact the Holy Guardian Angel, a key concept in Thelema and other esoteric traditions. It serves purposes of spiritual protection, purification, and preparation for deeper magical workings, aiming to facilitate a connection with higher spiritual forces.

Today, the Bornless Ritual remains significant in Western esotericism, especially in the pursuit of the Knowledge and Conversation of the Holy Guardian Angel. Its continued use underscores its foundational role and impact on the spiritual journey in modern occult practices.

== Historical origins and development ==
The Bornless Ritual is deeply rooted in ancient texts and traditions, drawing from Graeco-Egyptian magical practices. One of the primary sources for the ritual is the Greek Magical Papyri (Papyri Graecae Magicae), a collection of ancient spells, invocations, and hymns compiled between the 2nd century BCE and the 5th century CE. This collection includes various rituals and invocations that have influenced the development of the Bornless Ritual.

The ritual is derived from a specific text within the Greek Magical Papyri known as the "Stele of Jeu the Hieroglyphist in his letter" (PGM V. 96–172). The original ritual was intended as a rite of exorcism. It refers to "Moses" and the "ceremonies of Israel", suggesting a Jewish influence. The Bornless Ritual was first published in England in 1852 by Charles Wycliffe Goodwin as Fragment of a Graeco-Egyptian Work Upon Magic for the Cambridge Antiquarian Society. In 1899, E. A. Wallis Budge included excerpts from it in his book Egyptian Magic.

The adaptation of the Bornless Ritual in the context of Western esotericism owes much to the Hermetic Order of the Golden Dawn (1887–1903). Samuel Liddell MacGregor Mathers, one of the primary founders of the Golden Dawn, is credited with incorporating the ritual into the order's teachings. The Golden Dawn's teachings and ceremonial practices played a significant role in preserving and popularizing the ritual. Israel Regardie's The Golden Dawn provides an in-depth look at the ritual's structure and its significance within the order's framework.

Aleister Crowley's extensive work on the ritual is detailed in his The Temple of Solomon the King, where he emphasizes its use for attaining the Knowledge and Conversation of the Holy Guardian Angel. His "Liber Samekh" offer a detailed interpretation and adaptation of the ritual, which he integrated into his practices. These foundational texts and references form the bedrock upon which contemporary understandings and practices of the Bornless Ritual are built.

== Theoretical foundations ==
The theoretical foundations of the Bornless Ritual are rooted in ancient Egyptian and Greek magical traditions, reflecting a synthesis of Hermetic, Gnostic, and early Christian influences. The ritual calls upon the "Bornless One", a term signifying a primordial, transcendent deity beyond the confines of birth and death. This concept is central to the Hermetic tradition, emphasizing the unity of the divine and the individual soul's capacity to access higher realms of existence. Philosophers such as Iamblichus and the Neoplatonists have significantly contributed to the metaphysical framework that informs the ritual, advocating the practice of theurgy to attain divine illumination.

In Thelema, the Bornless Ritual is particularly significant for its role in the "Invocation of the Knowledge and Conversation of the Holy Guardian Angel". The invocation's structure and language are designed to evoke a profound spiritual response, tapping into the archetypal imagery and symbolism present in ancient magical traditions. The ritual's invocation of divine names, magical formulae and attributes is intended to align the practitioner with cosmic forces, facilitating a state of heightened spiritual awareness and connection with the Holy Guardian Angel. This alignment bridges the gap between the material and spiritual worlds, enabling the practitioner to wield spiritual authority and attain deeper self-realization.

== Structure ==
The structure of the Bornless Ritual is composed of several key components that together form an impactful invocation. It begins with the declaration of the practitioner's intent and a series of preparatory invocations aimed at purifying and consecrating the ritual space. The core of the ritual involves the recitation of the central invocation, which addresses the Bornless One and enumerates divine attributes, invoking protection, guidance, and spiritual authority. This central invocation is a detailed litany that calls upon various divine names and attributes, establishing a connection with higher spiritual forces. The invocation includes references to ancient deities such as the Egyptian god Thoth and the Greek god Hermes, symbolizing wisdom and communication.

Following the central invocation, the ritual concludes with a series of closing statements, reaffirming the practitioner's connection to the divine and sealing the ritual space. Each segment is rich with symbolism, drawing on elements from various esoteric traditions to create a unified magical operation. The language used in the ritual is designed to resonate deeply with the practitioner's unconscious mind, invoking a sense of awe and numinosity. This intricate structure ensures that the ritual is both a spiritual and psychological journey, guiding the practitioner through stages of purification, invocation, and empowerment. In Thelema, these stages facilitate the Knowledge and Conversation of the Holy Guardian Angel, with the aim of establishing a profound connection with one's true divine self.

== Practical application ==
In ancient times, the Bornless Ritual was primarily used for exorcism and healing. Its invocation of the "Bornless One" was believed to summon a transcendent power capable of banishing negative influences and purifying the practitioner and their surroundings. This use of the ritual reflects its roots in the Graeco-Egyptian magical traditions, where it served as a means of invoking divine assistance for health and protection. The ritual's exorcistic qualities was thought to make it effective for warding off malevolent entities and ensuring the safety of the practitioner.

In modern ceremonial magic, the Bornless Ritual serves multiple purposes, extending its ancient applications to more complex magical workings. It is often used to invoke divine guidance and protection, enhancing the practitioner's spiritual resilience and clarity. Practitioners often report heightened states of consciousness and profound spiritual experiences as a result of performing the Bornless Ritual. It is considered an advanced practice within the magical community, often performed after preparatory rituals such as the lesser ritual of the pentagram.

In the Golden Dawn, it was used as an invocation of the knowledge and conversation of the Holy Guardian Angel. Crowley included his version of the ritual in his book "Liber Samekh". It is a core method and milestone in Thelema, and is often considered the proper preliminary invocation to the Ars Goetia since it was introduced as such by Crowley.

== Performance ==
Performing the Bornless Ritual requires meticulous attention to detail and a profound understanding of its components. The practitioner must begin by purifying themselves through bathing and donning ritual garments, followed by the consecration of the ritual space with incense and the drawing of protective symbols. The ritual proceeds with the chanting of the invocation, during which the practitioner must focus intensely on the words and their meanings. The use of specific gestures and movements can enhance the ritual's effectiveness, aligning the practitioner's body and mind with the invocation's spiritual intent.

At the climax of the ritual is the powerful invocation of the Bornless One, a key segment that exemplifies the depth and complexity of the ritual. This climactic invocation as translated from the text by Hans Dieter Betz reads:

I am the headless daimon with my sight in my feet; [I am] the mighty one [who possesses] the immortal fire; I am the truth who hates the fact that unjust deeds are done in the world; I am the one who makes the lightning flash and the thunder roll; I am the one whose sweat is the heavy rain which falls upon the earth that it might be inseminated; I am the one whose mouth burns completely; I am the one who begets and destroys; I am the Favor of the Aion; my name is a heart encircled by a serpent; come forth and follow.

Variations of the ritual exist, allowing for adaptations to different traditions and personal preferences, but the core elements remain consistent. Common challenges include maintaining concentration and navigating the intense energies invoked, which can be overwhelming for the unprepared practitioner. However, with practice and experience, these challenges can be managed effectively. The Bornless Ritual demands a high level of commitment and discipline, but its rewards in terms of spiritual empowerment and enlightenment make it a cornerstone of ceremonial magic practice.

== Spiritual and psychological effects ==
Practitioners often report a heightened sense of spiritual clarity and connection, experiencing visions or insights during and after the ritual. The repetitive and rhythmic nature of the invocation induces a trance-like state, facilitating deeper meditation and introspection. This process can lead to significant personal transformations, as the practitioner confronts and transcends inner obstacles. Practitioners may also use it to integrate their spirituality into their daily lives and navigate their feelings about their place within the cosmos.

== Retreat and intensive practice ==
In modern esoteric practice, the Bornless Ritual is often integrated into intensive retreat settings to potentiate its effects. Inspired by the Abramelin operation, these retreats can span several months. Crowley developed a six-month version detailed in "Liber VIII". During these retreats, practitioners focus intensively on the ritual, aiming to achieve the Knowledge and Conversation of the Holy Guardian Angel. The extended period of focused practice allows for deeper spiritual engagement and transformation, enhancing the ritual's efficacy and impact.

Reports from practitioners who have undertaken these intensive retreats often mention profound psychological and spiritual experiences. Many practitioners describe encounters with Jungian archetypes, which are symbolic representations of universal human experiences and emotions. These archetypes can emerge during the deep meditative and trance states induced by the ritual, providing insights into the practitioner's unconscious mind.

Additionally, some practitioners report experiencing atavistic resurgence, where ancient, primal aspects of the psyche surface during the ritual. These experiences can be both enlightening and challenging, as they confront practitioners with deeply buried aspects of their psyche that require integration and understanding. The intensive nature of the retreat amplifies these experiences.

== Scholarly perspectives ==
Scholarly interest in the Bornless Ritual spans various disciplines, including religious studies, anthropology, and psychology. Researchers analyze its historical roots, comparing it with similar rituals across different cultures and epochs. Academic studies often focus on the ritual's linguistic and symbolic components, exploring their psychological impacts and the mechanisms by which they induce altered states of consciousness.

While scholars critique efficacy of prayer from a scientific perspective, others acknowledge its cultural and spiritual significance, contributing to a broader understanding of esoteric practices. Jake Stratton-Kent has produced a robust analysis, examining its historical and practical aspects in detail. Richard Kaczynski's work on Aleister Crowley and Thelema also provides valuable insights into the ritual's context and evolution. Contemporary researchers continue to explore its applications and adaptations in modern occultism, examining how the ritual evolves and maintains its relevance.

== See also ==
- Abrahadabra – Magical formula
- The Book of Abramelin – Book by Abraham of Worms
- Deity yoga – Vajrayana practice involving visualization of a deity
- Goetia (magic) – Practice of supernatural beings and forces
- Ishtadevata – A worshipper's favourite deity, in Hinduism
- Juno and Genius – Tutelary entity or double
- Magical thinking – Belief in the connection of unrelated events
- Tutelary deity – Guardian/patron deity or spirit
- Yidam – Buddhist tutelary deity
