= The Book of the Law =

Central sacred text of Thelema

The Book of the Law, or Liber AL vel Legis
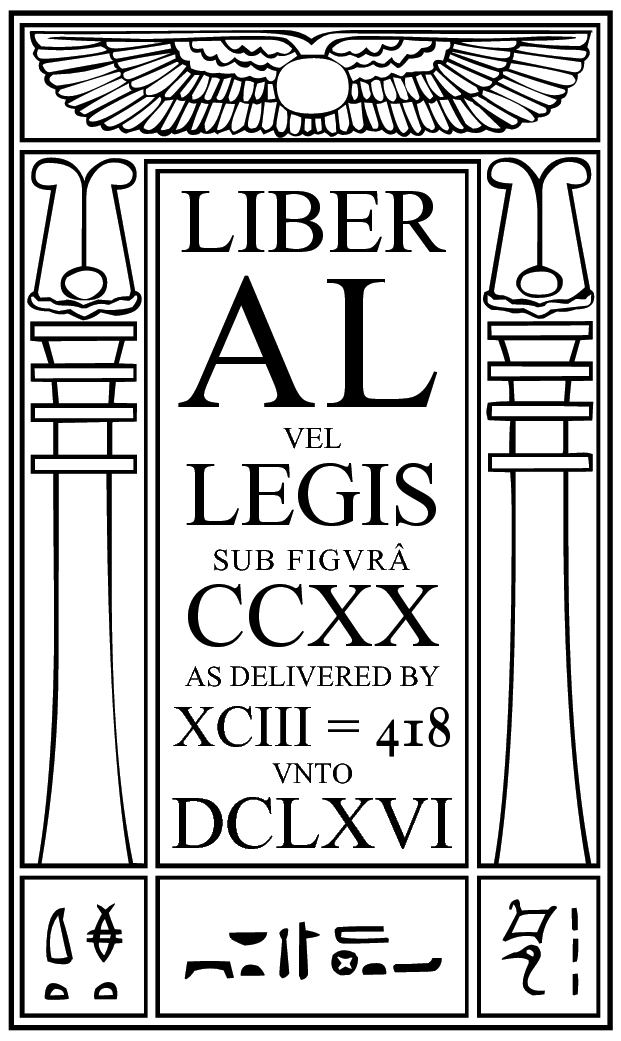
- Cover of The Book of the Law
- Author: Aleister Crowley
- Language: English
- Publication date: 1909
- Publication place: Egypt
- Text: The Book of the Law, or Liber AL vel Legis at Wikisource

Liber AL vel Legis (Classical Latin: [ˈlɪbɛr aː.ɛɫ wɛl‿ˈleːgɪs]), commonly known as The Book of the Law, is the central sacred text of Thelema. The book is often referred to simply as Liber AL, Liber Legis or just AL, though technically the latter two refer only to the manuscript.

The English occultist Aleister Crowley wrote the Liber AL vel Legis in 1904, saying that the book was dictated to him by a beyond-human being, Aiwass, who he later referred to as his own Holy Guardian Angel. Crowley claimed this event marked the arrival of a new stage in the spiritual evolution of humanity, to be known as the "Æon of Horus". (Note: Crowley (1989), p. 399: "I may now point out that the reign of the Crowned and Conquering Child is limited in time by The Book of the Law itself. We learn that Horus will be in his turn succeeded by Hrumachis ...") (Note: Crowley (1991), ch. 8: "In this revelation is the basis of the future Aeon ... The new Aeon is ... of Horus.") The primary precept of this new aeon is the charge, "Do what thou wilt shall be the whole of the Law."

The book contains three chapters, each of which Crowley said had been dictated and written down in one hour, beginning at noon, on 8 April, 9 April, and 10 April in Cairo, Egypt, in the year 1904. The three chapters of the book are attributed to the deities Nuit, Hadit, and Ra-Hoor-Khuit. Rose Edith Kelly, Crowley's wife, corrected two phrases in the manuscript.

Crowley later wrote that "Certain very serious questions have arisen with regard to the method by which this Book was obtained. I do not refer to those doubts—real or pretended—which hostility engenders, for all such are dispelled by study of the text; no forger could have prepared so complex a set of numerical and literal puzzles[...]" Biographer Lawrence Sutin quotes private diaries that fit this story and writes that "If ever Crowley uttered the truth of his relation to the Book," his public account accurately describes what he remembered on this point.

== Structure and title ==
The technical title of the book is Liber AL vel Legis, sub figura CCXX, as delivered by XCIII=418 to DCLXVI, although this title never occurs in the Book itself, which refers to itself as "the Book of the Law" and "the threefold Book of Law" (chapters 1:35, 3:75). CCXX is 220 in Roman figures, representing The Tree of Life (10 numbers times 22 paths), and is the number of verses of the Book in typescript. XCIII is 93, the enumeration of both "The word of the law" Thelema and Aiwass. DCLXVI is 666, the number of Crowley as Great Beast both as Adept and Magus. This is a way of saying that the book was delivered by Aiwass (whose number is both 93 and 418) to Crowley, who is The Beast 666.

The facsimile manuscript of the Book is not, however, numbered 220, but XXXI (31) as the first chapter's verses are unnumbered in the original manuscript: that is, no verse numbers were dictated to Crowley for chapter one. Both editions were titled by Crowley AL, pronounced "El", value 31, so therefore Liber 31 is the manuscript of The Book of the Law called AL (not be confused with Liber 31 by C. S. Jones (Frater Achad), which is an exegesis of some of the qabalistic symbolism of the Book), whereas Liber 220 is the edited (strictly according to the editing instructions dictated as part of the text of the Book itself), printed form of the text. (Note: See The Equinox of the Gods for a full account by Crowley of the reception and publishing of the Book according to these internal instructions.)

The original title of the book was Liber L vel Legis. Crowley retitled it Liber AL vel Legis in 1921, when he also gave the handwritten manuscript its own title.

== Creation ==
=== Summons ===
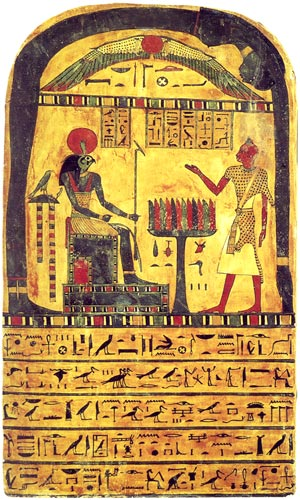
The Stele of Revealing (Bulaq 666): Nuit, Hadit as the winged solar disk, Ra-Hoor-Khuit seated on his throne, and the stele's owner, Ankh-af-na-khonsu

According to Crowley, the story began on 16 March 1904, when he tried to "shew the Sylphs" by use of the Bornless Ritual to his wife, Rose Edith Kelly, while spending the night in the King's Chamber of the Great Pyramid of Giza. Although she could see nothing, she did seem to enter into a light trance and repeatedly said, "They're waiting for you!" Since Rose had no interest in magic or mysticism, she took little interest. However, on the 18th, after he invoked Thoth (the god of knowledge), she mentioned Horus by name as the one waiting for him. Crowley, still skeptical, asked her numerous questions about Horus, which she answered accurately supposedly without having any prior study of the subject.

Crowley also gives a different chronology, in which an invocation of Horus preceded the questioning. Lawrence Sutin says this ritual described Horus in detail, and could have given Rose the answers to her husband's questions.

As part of his 'test' for Rose, Crowley wrote that they visited the Bulaq Museum where Crowley asked her to point out an image of Horus. Much to Crowley's initial amusement, she passed by several common images of the god, and went upstairs. From across the room Rose identified Horus on the stele of Ankh-ef-en-Khonsu, then housed under inventory number 666 (since moved to the Egyptian Museum of Cairo, number A 9422). The stela would subsequently be known to Thelemites (adherents of Thelema) as the "Stele of Revealing".

On 20 March, Crowley invoked Horus, "with great success". Between 23 March and 8 April, Crowley had the hieroglyphs on the stele translated. Also, Rose revealed that her "informant" was not Horus himself, but his messenger, Aiwass.

Finally, on 7 April, Rose gave Crowley his instructions—for three days he was to enter the "temple" and write down what he heard between noon and 1:00 P.M.

=== Speakers ===
Although the messenger of Liber AL was Aiwass, each chapter is presented as an expression of one of three god-forms: Nuit, Hadit, and Ra-Hoor-Khuit.

The first chapter is spoken by Nuit, the Egyptian goddess of the night sky, called the Queen of Space. Crowley calls her the "Lady of the Starry Heaven, who is also Matter in its deepest metaphysical sense, who is the infinite in whom all we live and move and have our being."

The second chapter is spoken by Hadit, who refers to himself as the "complement of Nu, my bride." As such, he is the infinitely condensed point, the center of her infinite circumference. Crowley says of him, "He is eternal energy, the Infinite Motion of Things, the central core of all being. The manifested Universe comes from the marriage of Nuit and Hadit; without this could no thing be. This eternal, this perpetual marriage-feast is then the nature of things themselves; and therefore, everything that exists is a "crystallisation of divine ecstasy", and "He sees the expansion and the development of the soul through joy."

The third chapter is spoken by Ra-Hoor-Khuit, "a god of War and of Vengeance", also identified as Hoor-paar-kraat, the Crowned and Conquering Child.

Crowley sums up the speakers of the three chapters thus, "we have Nuit, Space, Hadit, the point of view; these experience congress, and so produce Heru-Ra-Ha, who combines the ideas of Ra-Hoor-Khuit and Hoor-paar-kraat."

The book also introduces:

- The Beast (The Great Beast 666, TO MEGA THERION, Aleister Crowley)
- The Scarlet Woman, also known as Babalon, the Mother of Abominations
- Ankh-af-na-khonsu (the historical priest associated with the Stele of Revealing)

=== Writing ===
Crowley said he wrote The Book of the Law on 8, 9 and 10 April 1904, between the hours of noon and 1:00 pm, in the flat where he and his new wife were staying for their honeymoon, which he described as being near the Boulak Museum in a fashionable European quarter of Cairo, let by the firm Congdon & Co. The apartment was on the ground floor, and the "temple" was the drawing room.

Crowley described the encounter in detail in The Equinox of the Gods, saying that as he sat at his desk in Cairo, the voice of Aiwass came from over his left shoulder in the furthest corner of the room. This voice is described as passionate and hurried, and was "of deep timbre, musical and expressive, its tones solemn, voluptuous, tender, fierce or aught else as suited the moods of the message. Not bass—perhaps a rich tenor or baritone." Further, the voice was devoid of "native or foreign accent".

Crowley also got a "strong impression" of the speaker's general appearance. Aiwass had a body composed of "fine matter", which had a gauze-like transparency. Further, he "seemed to be a tall, dark man in his thirties, well-knit, active and strong, with the face of a savage king, and eyes veiled lest their gaze should destroy what they saw. The dress was not Arab; it suggested Assyria or Persia, but very vaguely.

Despite initially writing that it was an "excellent example of automatic writing", Crowley later insisted that it was not just automatic writing (though the writing included aspects of this, since when Crowley tried to stop writing he was compelled to continue. The writing also recorded Crowley's own thoughts). Rather he said that the experience was exactly like an actual voice speaking to him. This resulted in him disclaiming authorship of the work in the usual sense:

Note, moreover, with what greedy vanity I claim authorship even of all the other A∴A∴ Books in Class A, though I wrote them inspired beyond all I know to be I. Yet in these Books did Aleister Crowley, the master of English both in prose and in verse, partake insofar as he was That. Compare those Books with The Book of the Law! The style [of the former] is simple and sublime; the imagery is gorgeous and faultless; the rhythm is subtle and intoxicating; the theme is interpreted in faultless symphony. There are no errors of grammar, no infelicities of phrase. Each Book is perfect in its kind.

I, daring to snatch credit for these [...] dared nowise to lay claim to have touched The Book of the Law, not with my littlest finger-tip.

Crowley himself was initially opposed to the book and its message. (Note: Crowley (1989), ch. 50: The fact of the matter was that I resented The Book of the Law with my whole soul. For one thing, it knocked my Buddhism completely on the head. ... I was bitterly opposed to the principles of the Book on almost every point of morality. The third chapter seemed to me gratuitously atrocious.) Shortly after making a few copies for evaluation by close friends, the manuscript was misplaced and forgotten about. It would be several years before it was found, and the first official publication occurred in 1909.

=== Original manuscript ===
A facsimile of the original handwritten manuscript was published in The Equinox, Volume I, Number VII, in 1912. In 1921, Crowley gave the manuscript its own title, "AL (Liber Legis), The Book of the Law, sub figura XXXI", to distinguish it from the typeset version. It is now sometimes referred to as simply "Liber XXXI".

The original manuscript was sent on Crowley's death to Karl Germer, the executor of his will and head of Ordo Templi Orientis (O.T.O.). On Germer's death no trace of it could be found in his papers. There matters rested until 1984, when Tom Whitmore, the new owner of a house in Berkeley, California, began searching through the junk left in the basement by the previous owner. Among the used mattresses, lumber, and outdated high school textbooks were two boxes of assorted papers and newspaper clippings dealing with Germer's affairs, the charter of the O.T.O. and an envelope containing the manuscript of The Book of the Law. Whitmore donated the papers to the O.T.O.

==== Changes to the manuscript ====
The final version of Liber Legis includes text that did not appear in the original writing, including many small changes to spelling. In several cases, stanzas from the Stele of Revealing were inserted within the text.

=== The Comment ===
Based on several passages, including: "My scribe Ankh-af-na-khonsu, the priest of the princes, shall not in one letter change this book; but lest there be folly, he shall comment thereupon by the wisdom of Ra-Hoor-Khuit" (AL I:36), Crowley felt compelled to interpret AL in writing. He wrote two large sets of commentaries where he attempted to decipher each line.

In 1912, he prepared AL and his current comments on it for publication in The Equinox, I(7). However, he was not satisfied with this initial attempt. He recalls in his confessions (Crowley 1989, p. 674) that he thought the existing commentary was "shamefully meagre and incomplete." He later explains, "I had stupidly supposed this Comment to be a scholarly exposition of the Book, an elucidation of its obscurities and a demonstration of its praeterhuman origin. I understand at last that this idea is nonsense. The Comment must be an interpretation of the Book intelligible to the simplest minds, and as practical as the Ten Commandments." Moreover, this Comment should be arrived at "inspirationally", as the Book itself had been.

Years later in 1925 while in Tunis, Tunisia, Crowley received his inspiration. He published "The Comment", in the Tunis edition of AL, of which only 11 copies were printed, and signed it as Ankh-f-n-khonsu (lit. "He Lives in Khonsu"—a historical priest who lived in Thebes in the 26th dynasty, associated with the Stele of Revealing). Crowley later tasked his friend and fellow O.T.O. member Louis Wilkinson with preparing an edited version of Crowley's commentaries which was published some time after Crowley's death as The Law is for All.

== Thelemic interpretations ==
Thanks in large part to "The Comment", the interpretation of the often cryptic text of Liber AL vel Legis is generally considered by Thelemites to be a matter for the individual reader. Crowley devoted much of his life to writing about Liber AL, seeking to decipher its mysteries and provide insights into its meanings.

Crowley emphasized that one of the main precepts of the book is the emancipation of mankind from all limitations. He viewed The Book of the Law as not just introducing a new religion, but also a new cosmology, philosophy, and ethics. According to Crowley, the word Thelema, as uttered by Aiwass, signified a complete departure from the formula of the Dying God, proposing instead a system that integrates the discoveries of science, from physics to psychology, into a coherent and consistent framework.

=== Via Hermetic Qabalah ===
Crowley employed Hermetic Qabalah, particularly its numerological method of gematria, to interpret the obscurities of Liber AL vel Legis. He explained that the text contains numerous instances of double entendre, paronomasia in one language or another, numerical-literal puzzles, and even connections of letters across various lines. Crowley detailed these interpretations in the Qabalistic section of his Commentary.

In Magick Without Tears, Crowley elaborated on his insights, stating that the "Author of the Book" (Aiwass) demonstrated profound knowledge of Qabalah. Initially, Crowley was assured that Aiwass knew at least as much Qabalah as he did. Over time, further study convinced him that Aiwass possessed a much higher level of Qabalistic knowledge, leading Crowley to regard Aiwass as the supreme Qabalist of all time.

In one of the Holy Books of Thelema (1907), called Liber Trigrammaton, sub figura XXVII -- Being the Book of the Mutations of the Tao with the Yin and the Yang, Crowley correlated the 26 Roman script letters to trigrams composed of a solid line for the Yang, a broken line for the Yin, and a point for the Tao. In doing so, Crowley felt that he had fulfilled the book's injunction to "obtain the order & value of the English Alphabet", as noted in his 'Old Comment' to The Book of the Law. However, he also wrote that "The attribution in Liber Trigrammaton is good theoretically; but no Qabalah of merit has risen therefrom."

=== Via prophecy ===
Crowley later considered the events of his life and the apparent fulfillment of certain 'predictions' in Liber AL vel Legis as further proof of its divine origin. He noted that Aiwass had foreseen and provided solutions to difficulties that Crowley only discovered years later, and sometimes even events that he had no part in bringing about.

One significant event was Charles Stansfeld Jones claiming the grade of Magister Templi, which Crowley interpreted as the birth of his 'Magical Son'. Crowley believed that Jones' subsequent discovery of the critical value of 31 was foretold in the book (II:76, III:47) and provided him with further insight into his qabalistic understanding and interpretation of the text. Upon receiving notification of this discovery, Crowley expressed his realization that Jones' key had unlocked deeper meanings within Liber AL vel Legis, noting that the text had unfolded like a flower and solved various enigmatic passages.

=== Via English Qaballa ===
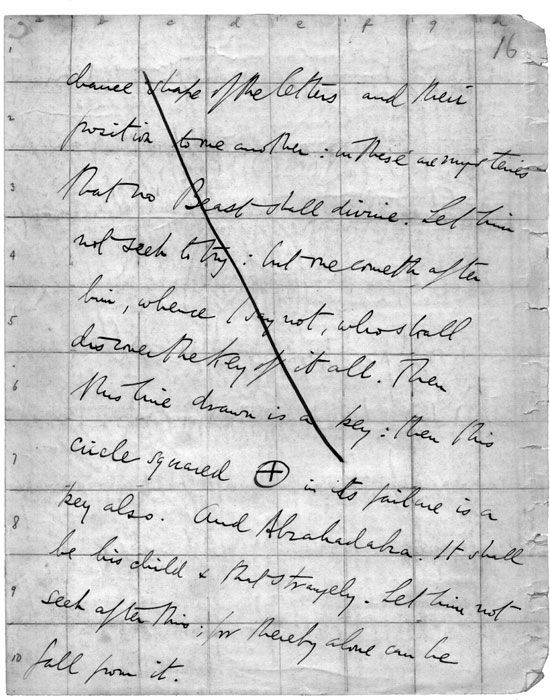
The mysterious 'grid' page of Liber AL's manuscript. "for in the chance shape of the letters and their position to one another: in these are mysteries that no Beast shall divine. ... Then this line drawn is a key: then this circle squared in its failure is a key also. And Abrahadabra."

English Qaballa (EQ) is an English-based Hermetic Qabalah supported by a system of arithmancy that interprets the letters of the English alphabet via an assigned set of values, discovered by James Lees in 1976. It is the result of an intent to understand, interpret, and elaborate on the mysteries of Aleister Crowley's received text, Liber AL vel Legis, the Book of the Law. According to Jake Stratton-Kent, "the English Qaballa is a qabalah and not a system of numerology. A qabalah is specifically related to three factors: one, a language; two, a 'holy' text or texts; three, mathematical laws at work in these two."

The "order & value" discovered by James Lees lays the letters out on the grid superimposed on the page of manuscript of Liber AL on which this verse (III:47) appears (sheet 16 of Chapter III). Also appearing on this page are a diagonal line and a circled cross. The Book of the Law states that the book should only be printed with Crowley's hand-written version included, suggesting that there are mysteries in the "chance shape of the letters and their position to one another" of Crowley's handwriting. Whichever top-left to bottom-right diagonal is read the magickal order of the letters is obtained.

== Scholarly analyses ==
Israel Regardie, former secretary to Crowley, offers a psychological interpretation of The Book of the Law in The Eye in the Triangle. Regardie suggests that the book can be understood as an expression of Crowley's complex psychological landscape, including his struggles with identity and spirituality. He explores the symbolic and archetypal dimensions of the text, providing insights into its deeper meanings and its significance in Crowley's magical philosophy. Regardie suggests that current psychological theory supports the idea that individuals possess various forms of knowledge and power of which they are unaware, aligning with both Freudian and Jungian theories.

Marco Pasi, in Aleister Crowley and the Temptation of Politics, delves into the philosophical underpinnings of The Book of the Law. Pasi highlights the connections between the text and Nietzschean thought, particularly the concept of the Übermensch. He discusses how Crowley's work reflects a radical individualism and a break from traditional religious and moral systems. Pasi places The Book of the Law within the broader context of early 20th-century intellectual and cultural movements.

Richard Kaczynski, a biographer and historian of Aleister Crowley, provides an in-depth analysis of The Book of the Law in his work, Perdurabo: The Life of Aleister Crowley. Kaczynski explores the historical and psychological contexts in which the book was received, discussing how Crowley's environment, personal experiences, and extensive knowledge of esoteric traditions influenced the content and structure of the book. His analysis includes a detailed examination of the book's themes, symbols, and its role in Crowley's overall magical system.

Lawrence Sutin, in his biography Do What Thou Wilt: A Life of Aleister Crowley, presents a critical perspective on The Book of the Law. Sutin argues that the text reflects Crowley's subconscious mind rather than a divine revelation, pointing out the possibility that Crowley's extensive knowledge of esoteric traditions and his personal aspirations heavily influenced the content of the book. Sutin provides a balanced view, acknowledging the text's impact while questioning its purported supernatural origins.

The Book of the Law is considered the cornerstone of Thelemic practice, influencing subsequent Thelemic texts and rituals. Its precepts form the basis for Thelemic ethical and spiritual guidance. Wouter J. Hanegraaff, in Western Esotericism: A Guide for the Perplexed, discusses how the book has impacted modern esoteric movements, noting that it has inspired various interpretations and adaptations in occult literature and practices, highlighting its lasting influence on contemporary spirituality.

=== Skeptical views ===
In The Eye in the Triangle, Regardie questions the significance of Rose's ability to answer Crowley's questions about Horus and the Qabala. Given that Rose had been married to Crowley for eight months at the time, Regardie proposed that Crowley may have used Rose as a 'sounding board' for many of his ideas, meaning she might not have been as ignorant of magick and mysticism as Crowley made out. In his introduction to his edition of The Law is for All, Regardie remarked that it ultimately did not matter whether The Book of the Law was dictated by a preterhuman intelligence named Aiwass or emerged from the creative depths of Aleister Crowley. He emphasized that Crowley became a mouthpiece for the Zeitgeist, accurately expressing the intrinsic nature of his time.

Charles R. Cammell, in his book Aleister Crowley: The Man, the Mage, the Poet, also believed that The Book of the Law was an expression of Crowley's personality. Cammell described the book's maxims as cold, cruel, and relentless, reflecting Crowley's own Daemonic personality. He noted that the manner of the book's reception made it a document of curious interest, partially emanating from Crowley's unconscious mind.

Scholar Joshua Gunn argued that the stylistic similarities between The Book of the Law and Crowley's poetic writings were too pronounced for it to be anything other than Crowley's work. Gunn pointed out that despite Crowley's belief in the superhuman inspiration of the book, its clichéd imagery, overwrought style, and elaborate ecphonetic displays mirrored Crowley's other poetic works, suggesting it was not the product of something supernatural.

== Editions ==
The Book of the Law as published in ΘΕΛΗΜΑ (1909)

The Book of the Law was first published in 1909 as part of ΘΕΛΗΜΑ, a collection of the holy books of Thelema. ΘΕΛΗΜΑ was privately published in London by the A∴A∴ as a three volume set, with The Book of the Law appearing in Volume III. It was next published in 1913 as part of The Equinox, Volume I, Number X. In both of these early editions it is titled Liber L vel Legis. Subsequent published editions include:

- 1925 Tunis edition, only 11 copies printed
- Ordo Templi Orientis, London, 1938, privately issued (US edition 1942, although dated 1938)
- Weiser Books (Reissue edition; 1976; ISBN 0-87728-334-6)
- Weiser Books (100th Anniversary edition; March 2004; ISBN 1-57863-308-7)
- Thelema Media (100th Anniversary edition; (leather bound limited edition: 418 copies); March 2004; ISBN 1-932599-03-7)
- Mandrake of Oxford (April 1992; paperback; ISBN 1-869928-93-8)

Liber AL is also published in several other books, including:

- The Holy Books of Thelema (Equinox III:9). (1983). York Beach, Maine: Samuel Weiser. ISBN 0-87728-579-9
- The Equinox (III:10). (1990). York Beach, Maine: Samuel Weiser. ISBN 0-87728-719-8
- Magick: Liber ABA, Book Four, Parts I–IV. (1997). York Beach, Maine: Samuel Weiser. ISBN 0-87728-919-0

== See also ==
- Aleister Crowley bibliography
- Liber Pennae Praenumbra
