= Heru-ra-ha =

Deity in Thelema

Heru-ra-ha (lit. 'Horus sun-flesh') is a composite deity related to ancient Egyptian mythology revered within Thelema, a religion that began in 1904 with Aleister Crowley and The Book of the Law. Heru-ra-ha is composed of Hoor-paar-kraat and Ra-Hoor-Khuit. He is associated with the other two major Thelemic deities found in The Book of the Law, Nuit and Hadit. Adherents believe the Stele of Ankh-ef-en-Khonsu, known within Thelema as the "Stele of Revealing", links Nuit, Hadit, and Ra-Hoor-Khuit to the ancient Egyptian deities Nut, Behdety, and Ra-Horakhty.

== Ra-Hoor-Khuit ==
The active aspect of Heru-ra-ha is Ra-Hoor-Khuit (Ancient Egyptian: rꜥ-ḥr-ꜣḫtj; sometimes also anglicized as Ra-Hoor-Khu-it, Ra-Har-Khuti, or Ra-Har-Akht; Egyptological pronunciation: Ra-Horakhty or Ra-Herakhty), means 'Ra (who is) Horus of the Horizon'. Ra-Hoor-Khuit or Ra-Hoor-Khut is the speaker in the third chapter of The Book of the Law, where the relationship with Heru-ra-ha and Hoor-pa-kraat is detailed in verse 35:

The half of the word of Heru-ra-ha, called Hoor-pa-kraat and Ra-Hoor-Khut.

Within Thelema, Ra-Hoor-Khuit is called 'Lord of the Aeon' (which began in 1904 according to Thelemic doctrine), and 'The Crowned and Conquering Child'. An appellation of Ra, identifying him with Horus, this name shows the two as manifestations of the singular solar force. According to Crowley, the five-pointed "star of flame" symbolizes Ra-Hoor-Khuit in certain contexts.

"Khuit" also refers to a local form of the goddess Hathor at Athribis, who guarded the heart of Osiris. "Khut" refers to the goddess Isis as light giver of the new year; some older sources say that it can also refer to the fiery serpent on the crown of Ra.

== Hoor-pa-kraat ==
The passive aspect of Heru-ra-ha is Hoor-pa-kraat (Ancient Egyptian: ḥr-pꜣ-ẖrd, meaning "Horus the Child"; Egyptological pronunciation: Har-pa-khered), more commonly referred to by the Greek rendering Harpocrates; Horus, the son of Isis and Osiris, sometimes distinguished from their brother Horus the Elder, who was the old patron deity of Upper Egypt. Hoor is represented as a young boy with a child's sidelock of hair, sucking his finger. The Greeks, Ovid, and the Hermetic Order of the Golden Dawn attributed silence to him, presumably because the sucking of the finger is suggestive of the common "shhh"-gesture.

Aiwass, the being who dictated The Book of the Law to Crowley, introduces himself as "the minister of Hoor-paar-kraat" in the book's first chapter.

Also known as "The Babe in the Lotus", Hoor-paar-kraat is sometimes thought of as the younger brother of Horus. The former interpretation in the works of Aleister Crowley portrays Ra-Hoor-Khuit—in place of the Golden Dawn's Osiris/Jesus—as a model for the initiate, and thus describes attainment as a natural growth process, de-emphasizing the metaphor of death and resurrection. In the second interpretation, the Golden Dawn placed Hoor-paar-kraat at the center of their Hall of Ma'at while the officers of the temple (one of whom represented Horus) revolved around him.

== See also ==
- Laws of Form
- Mark and space
- Worship of heavenly bodies
