= Therion (Thelema) =

Deity found in the mystical system of Thelema

Therion (thēríon) (Greek: θηρίον, beast) is a deity found in the mystical system of Thelema, which was established in 1904 with Aleister Crowley's writing of The Book of the Law. Therion's female counterpart is Babalon, another Thelemic deity. Therion, as a Thelemic godform, evolved from that of "The Beast" from the Book of Revelation, whom Crowley identified himself with since childhood, because his mother called him that name.

== Background ==
Throughout his life Crowley occasionally referred to himself as “Master Therion” or sometimes “The Beast 666”. He wrote:

Before I touched my teens, I was already aware that I was THE BEAST whose number is 666. I did not understand in the least what that implied; it was a passionately ecstatic sense of identity.

== Use in ritual ==
The word "Therion" is mentioned in several Thelemic rituals, such as The Star Ruby. In total, there are five mentions of The Beast in Liber AL vel Legis, the first being in 1:15, and the remaining four are all in the third chapter—verses 14, 22, 34, and 47, respectively—although the word “beast” can be found elsewhere therein. Aleister Crowley believed that the references to The Beast and the Scarlet Woman (Babalon) in the book “do not denote persons but are titles of office”. The first mention reads thus:

Now ye shall know that the chosen priest & apostle of infinite space is the prince-priest the Beast; and in his woman called the Scarlet Woman is all power given.

== Numerology ==
The Number of the Beast is 666. The number is significant in the system of Thelema. It is the sum of the numbers inside the 6-by-6 magic square, which is associated with the sun by some Kabbalists, astrologists, and numerologists. According to Crowley, it is a solar number. The Stele of Revealing bore the catalogue number 666 at the time when Crowley discovered it.

Lon Milo DuQuette has written that the Hebrew letter shin (ש), which is written at the beginning and end of the Hebrew word for 'sun' (shemesh), conceals in itself the number of The Beast, because its shape is like three vavs (ו) conjoined together, whose gematrical value is 6.

The following words and phrases have 666 for their gematrical value:

- אליסטיר קרולי — ALISTIR QRWLY; a Hebrew spelling of the name “Aleister Crowley”.
- נכיאל multiplied by 6 (111x6) — NKIAL; Nachiel; the intelligence of the sun.
- נמרוד מכוש - NMRVD MKVSh; Nimrod M'kush; Hebrew for "Nimrod from Cush".
- נשימירון — NShIMIRVN; Nashimiron; the qlippoth of Pisces.
- פרי שלום — PRI ShLVM; pri shalom; Hebrew for “fruit of peace”.
- סורת — SVRTh; Sorath; the evil spirit of the sun.
- תריון — ThRIVN; a Hebrew transliteration of “θηριον” / “therion”, Greek for “beast”.
- Το Μεγα Θηριον — Greek for “The Great Beast”. Koine Greek is the Greek dialect by which the books of the New Testament were written, including the Book of Revelation, where the original mention of The Beast's number is recorded (13:17-18).

== See also ==
- Padmasambhava
- Magical formula
