= True Will =

Concept within the system of Thelema

True Will is a foundational concept in Thelema, the philosophical and magical framework established by Aleister Crowley early in the 20th century. It represents the intrinsic and divine purpose unique to each individual, transcending mere personal desires and societal expectations. At the core of Crowley's teachings is "Do what thou wilt shall be the whole of the Law", a central dictum of his received work, The Book of the Law. This principle asserts not a license for unchecked indulgence, but rather a mandate for individuals to align their actions with their truest spiritual calling. By adhering to their True Will, practitioners of Thelema seek to fulfill their spiritual destiny by harmonising with the cosmic order.

Crowley, drawing from diverse mystical traditions and personal experiences, articulated True Will as essential to personal fulfillment and universal harmony. For Crowley, the journey to uncover one's True Will requires deep introspection, spiritual discipline, and a commitment to the ethical conduct outlined in The Book of the Law. This work, written down during a revelatory experience in 1904, serves as a guiding principle for Thelemites and emphasizes the transformative power of aligning one's life with one's True Will.

== Background ==
Crowley (1875–1947), was an influential figure in the world of Western esotericism and the founder of Thelema. His journey into the occult began in his early twenties, culminating in the establishment of Thelema, a religious and philosophical system that combined elements of mysticism, magick, and esoteric traditions.

The development of Thelema was significantly influenced by Crowley's mystical experiences and extensive study of various esoteric traditions. One of the pivotal moments in Crowley's life was his reception of The Book of the Law in 1904, a text he maintained that he received from a higher entity named Aiwass. This book laid the foundation for Thelema, introducing key concepts such as True Will and the Thelemic law, "Do what thou wilt shall be the whole of the Law".

Crowley's teachings and writings on Thelema expanded throughout his life, incorporating elements from his experiences with the Hermetic Order of the Golden Dawn, his travels to Egypt and other mystical sites, and his interactions with other occultists. His work synthesized various strands of Western esoteric thought into a cohesive system that emphasized personal spiritual development and the pursuit of True Will.

== Concept and meaning ==
True Will in Thelema refers to an individual's unique, divinely ordained purpose or path in life. It is the core principle that guides a person's actions and decisions, transcending personal desires and ego-driven motives. According to Crowley, True Will is the expression of one's deepest and most authentic self, aligned with the universal order.

Distinguishing True Will from ego-driven desires is crucial in Thelemic practice. While personal desires often stem from temporary emotions, societal conditioning, or superficial goals, True Will represents a higher calling that aligns with the cosmic order and one's inherent nature. Pursuing ego-driven desires can lead to conflict, dissatisfaction, and disharmony, whereas following one's True Will brings about a sense of fulfillment, purpose, and alignment with the greater good.

True Will is not static but evolves as individuals grow and develop spiritually. Discovering and understanding one's True Will requires introspection, self-discipline, and spiritual practices that help uncover the deeper layers of one's being. In Thelema, various techniques such as meditation, ritual magick, and divination are used to gain insight into one's True Will and to align one's actions with this higher purpose.

Crowley believed that in order to discover the True Will, one had to free the desires of the unconscious mind from the control of the conscious mind, especially the restrictions placed on sexual expression, which he associated with the power of divine creation. He identified the True Will of each individual with the Holy Guardian Angel, a daimon unique to each individual. The spiritual quest to find what one is meant to do and to do it is known in Thelema as the Great Work.

== Cosmic order ==
In Thelema, True Will is understood as being in harmony with the cosmic order. This alignment signifies that an individual's purpose is not isolated but interconnected with the universe's grand design. Crowley posited that each person's True Will functions as a unique and essential component of the larger framework of existence, contributing to the harmony and balance of the cosmos.

The philosophical implications of True Will suggest that when individuals act in accordance with their True Will, they contribute positively to the universal order, creating a ripple effect of balance and harmony. This perspective aligns with various Western esoteric traditions that emphasize the interconnectedness of all things and the importance of aligning personal actions with higher principles.

Parallels can be drawn between the concept of True Will and other philosophical and mystical traditions that advocate for living in accordance with one's true nature or divine purpose. In essence, True Will represents the unique expression of the divine within each individual, and living in alignment with it is seen as the highest form of spiritual fulfillment and contribution to the universal order.

== Methods for discovery ==
Discovering True Will is a central pursuit in Thelemic practice and involves various spiritual disciplines and personal development techniques. Aleister Crowley emphasized the importance of self-exploration, meditation, and magick as key methods for uncovering one's True Will.

Regular meditation and introspective practices help individuals quiet the mind and connect with their inner self. Through these practices, one can gain insights into their true nature and purpose, distinguishing True Will from transient desires. Thelemic rituals and magical practices are also designed to align the practitioner with their True Will. These rituals often involve invoking higher powers, performing symbolic actions, and using tools like tarot cards or astrological charts to gain deeper understanding and guidance.

Seeking guidance from experienced practitioners, mentors, or spiritual leaders within Thelemic communities can provide valuable insights and support in the journey toward discovering True Will. The structured teachings and communal support can help individuals navigate their spiritual path more effectively. Additionally, engaging in continuous personal development, including studying Thelemic texts, self-discipline, and self-improvement practices, is essential for aligning one's life with their True Will. This ongoing process helps individuals refine their understanding and application of True Will in their daily lives.

== Ethical dimensions ==
True Will encompasses not only personal freedom but also a profound sense of responsibility towards others and the universe. The ethical dimensions of True Will emphasize that while individuals are encouraged to pursue their unique path, they must also consider the impact of their actions on the broader community and cosmic order.

Thelema teaches that true freedom is achieved through the alignment with one's True Will, which naturally harmonizes with the greater good. This balance between personal freedom and responsibility is reflected in the Thelemic law, "Love is the law, love under will." This principle underscores that love and compassion must guide the exercise of one's True Will, ensuring that actions contribute positively to the well-being of others and the world.

Balancing personal freedom with responsibility requires a deep understanding of one's True Will and a commitment to ethical living. Thelemic practice encourages individuals to develop a strong moral compass, guided by the principles of love, compassion, and justice, to ensure that their pursuit of True Will benefits both themselves and the larger community.

== In Thelemic texts ==
Several key Thelemic texts provide in-depth discussions on the concept of True Will, including The Book of the Law (also known as Liber AL vel Legis) and other writings by Aleister Crowley. These texts serve as foundational sources for understanding and practicing True Will in Thelema.

- The Book of the Law: This seminal text, received by Crowley in 1904, outlines the core principles of Thelema, including the concept of True Will. The central tenet, "Do what thou wilt shall be the whole of the Law," emphasizes the importance of discovering and following one's True Will as the path to spiritual fulfillment and harmony with the cosmic order.
- "Liber II: The Message of the Master Therion": In this text, Crowley elaborates on the meaning and implications of True Will, providing practical guidance for its discovery and application in daily life. He stresses the distinction between True Will and personal desires, highlighting the importance of aligning with one's higher purpose.
- Magick Without Tears: This collection of letters written by Crowley offers insights into various aspects of Thelemic philosophy, including the concept of True Will. Crowley addresses common questions and challenges faced by practitioners, providing practical advice and encouragement for pursuing True Will.

These texts, among others, form the basis for Thelemic practice and study, offering a comprehensive understanding of True Will and its significance within the broader framework of Thelema.

== Practical applications ==
True Will is not only a philosophical concept but also a practical guide for living within Thelemic communities. Various Thelemic orders and organizations, such as Ordo Templi Orientis (O.T.O.), provide structured practices and rituals to help individuals discover and align with their True Will.

- Ordo Templi Orientis: This Thelemic order offers a range of rituals, initiations, and teachings designed to facilitate the discovery and pursuit of True Will. The initiatory structure of the O.T.O. provides a supportive environment for personal and spiritual development, emphasizing the importance of True Will in all aspects of life.
- A∴A∴: Another key Thelemic organization which focuses on individual spiritual advancement and the attainment of True Will through rigorous training, meditation, and magical practices. The order's curriculum is designed to guide practitioners through progressive stages of self-discovery and alignment with their True Will.

Regular participation in communal rituals, ceremonies, and study groups within Thelemic communities reinforces the principles of True Will and provides opportunities for shared learning and support. These communal practices help individuals stay aligned with their True Will and foster a sense of belonging and mutual encouragement.

== Influence and legacy ==
The concept of True Will has had a significant impact on modern esoteric and occult practices, as well as contemporary spirituality and personal development movements. Crowley's teachings on True Will have influenced a wide range of spiritual and philosophical traditions, contributing to a broader understanding of purpose and self-realization.

In modern esoteric practices, True Will has been incorporated into various traditions, including Neopagan witchcraft, chaos magic, and other occult practices. These traditions emphasize the importance of aligning with one's True Will as a path to spiritual empowerment and transformation. The principles of True Will have also influenced personal development and self-help movements, which often stress the importance of discovering one's true purpose and living authentically. Crowley's ideas have inspired many individuals to seek deeper self-awareness and fulfillment through the pursuit of their True Will.

In the broader context of contemporary spirituality, the concept of True Will resonates with themes of self-discovery, authenticity, and alignment with a higher purpose. It has contributed to a growing emphasis on personal spiritual growth and the exploration of individual paths to enlightenment. The enduring legacy of True Will is evident in its continued relevance and application across diverse spiritual and philosophical contexts, reflecting its profound impact on the quest for meaning and purpose in modern life.

== See also ==
- Aleister Crowley bibliography
- Agency – Capacity of an actor to act in a given environment
- Chokmah – Biblical Hebrew word; 2nd emanation in Kabbalah
- Free will – Ability to make choices voluntarily
- Future self – Research that examines the processes of thinking of oneself in the future
- Psychology of self – Study of the representation of one's identity
- Self-agency – The phenomenal will
- Volition – Cognitive process of decision to act
- Will – Faculty that selects among a being's desires
- Will to power – Philosophical concept
- Ziran – Key concept in Taoism and East Asian Buddhism
