= Aiwass =

Non-physical entity in Thelema

Aiwass is the name given to a voice that the English occultist and ceremonial magician Aleister Crowley reported to have heard on April 8, 9, and 10 in 1904. Crowley reported that this voice, which he considered originated with a non-corporeal being, dictated a text known as The Book of the Law or Liber AL vel Legis to him during his honeymoon in Cairo.

== Dictation ==
According to Crowley, Aiwass first appeared during the Three Days of the writing of Liber al vel Legis. His first and only identification as such is in Chapter I: "Behold! it is revealed by Aiwass the minister of Hoor-paar-kraat" (AL I:7).

Hoor-paar-kraat (Egyptian: Har-pa-khered) is more commonly referred to by the Greek transliteration Harpocrates, meaning "Horus the Child", whom Crowley considered to be the central deity within the Thelemic cosmology (see Æon of Horus). Simultaneously, Harpocrates also represents the Higher Self, the Holy Guardian Angel.

Crowley described the encounter in detail in his 1936 book The Equinox of the Gods, saying:

The Voice of Aiwass came apparently from over my left shoulder, from the furthest corner of the room. It seemed to echo itself in my physical heart in a very strange manner, hard to describe. I have noticed a similar phenomenon when I have been waiting for a message fraught with great hope or dread. The voice was passionately poured, as if Aiwass were alert about the time-limit ... The voice was of deep timbre, musical and expressive, its tones solemn, voluptuous, tender, fierce or aught else as suited the moods of the message. Not bass – perhaps a rich tenor or baritone. The English was free of either native or foreign accent, perfectly pure of local or caste mannerisms, thus startling and even uncanny at first hearing. I had a strong impression that the speaker was actually in the corner where he seemed to be, in a body of "fine matter," transparent as a veil of gauze, or a cloud of incense-smoke. He seemed to be a tall, dark man in his thirties, well-knit, active and strong, with the face of a savage king, and eyes veiled lest their gaze should destroy what they saw. The dress was not Arab; it suggested Assyria or Persia, but very vaguely. I took little note of it, for to me at that time Aiwass was an "angel" such as I had often seen in visions, a being purely astral.

In the later-written Liber 418, the voice of the 8th Aethyr says "my name is called Aiwass", and "in The Book of the Law did I write the secrets of truth that are like unto a star and a snake and a sword." Crowley says this later manifestation took the form of a pyramid of light.

== Identity ==
Crowley went to great pains to argue that Aiwass was an objectively separate being from himself, possessing far more knowledge than he or any other human could possibly have. He wrote "no forger could have prepared so complex a set of numerical and literal puzzles". As Crowley writes in his Confessions: "I was bound to admit that Aiwass had shown a knowledge of the Cabbala immeasurably superior to my own" and "We are forced to conclude that the author of The Book of the Law is an intelligence both alien and superior to myself, yet acquainted with my inmost secrets; and, most important point of all, that this intelligence is discarnate." Finally, this excerpt (also from Confessions, ch.49):

The existence of true religion presupposes that of some discarnate intelligence, whether we call him God or anything else. And this is exactly what no religion had ever proved scientifically. And this is what The Book of the Law does prove by internal evidence, altogether independent of any statement of mine. This proof is evidently the most important step in science that could possibly be made: for it opens up an entirely new avenue to knowledge. The immense superiority of this particular intelligence, AIWASS, to any other with which mankind has yet been in conscious communication is shown not merely by the character of the book itself, but by the fact of his comprehending perfectly the nature of the proof necessary to demonstrate the fact of his own existence and the conditions of that existence. And, further, having provided the proof required.

However, Crowley also spoke of Aiwass in symbolic terms. In The Law Is for All, he goes on at length in comparison to various other deities and spiritual concepts, but most especially to The Fool. For example, he writes of Aiwass: "In his absolute innocence and ignorance he is The Fool; he is the Saviour, being the Son who shall trample on the crocodiles and tigers, and avenge his father Osiris. Thus we see him as the Great Fool of Celtic legend, the Pure Fool of Act I of Parsifal, and, generally speaking, the insane person whose words have always been taken for oracles."

Perhaps more importantly, Crowley later identified Aiwass as his own personal Holy Guardian Angel and more. Again from the Equinox of the Gods: "I now incline to believe that Aiwass is not only the God once held holy in Sumer, and mine own Guardian Angel, but also a man as I am, insofar as He uses a human body to make His magical link with Mankind, whom He loves, and that He is thus an Ipsissimus, the Head of the A∴A∴".

Yet even while eventually identifying Aiwass as his Holy Guardian Angel, Crowley still went to even greater lengths in his later years to insist that Aiwass was an objective entity apart from himself, even going as far as to declare in no uncertain terms that the Holy Guardian Angel is not only entirely objective, but is also not to be confused with the "Higher Self," as in his final work, Magick Without Tears: "The Holy Guardian Angel is not the 'Higher Self' but an Objective individual. . . . He is not, let me say with emphasis, a mere abstraction from yourself; and that is why I have insisted rather heavily that the term 'Higher Self' implies 'a damnable heresy and a dangerous delusion'. . . . If it were not so, there would be no point in The Sacred Magic of Abramelin the Mage."

In Magick in Theory and Practice, Aiwass is identified by Crowley as Lucifer. This assertion is made in a footnote where Crowley is discussing the Devil, who he asserts does not exist. He goes on to clarify his statements by explaining that the Devil is in reality a label for the God of any people that one dislikes, and that this fact has led to so much "confusion of thought" on the subject that Crowley prefers to:

let names stand as they are, and to proclaim simply that AIWAZ—the solar-phallic-hermetic "Lucifer"—is His own Holy Guardian Angel, and "The Devil" SATAN or HADIT, the Supreme Soul behind RA-HOOR-KHUIT the Sun, the Lord of our particular unit of the Starry Universe. This serpent, SATAN, is not the enemy of Man, but He who made Gods of our race, knowing Good and Evil; He bade 'Know Thyself!' and taught Initiation. He is "the Devil" of the Book of Thoth, and His emblem is BAPHOMET, the Androgyne who is the hieroglyph of arcane perfection.

=== Skeptical views ===
A number of authors have expressed the view that Aiwass was most likely an unconscious manifestation of Crowley's personality. Occultist Israel Regardie argued for this view in his Crowley biography, The Eye in the Triangle, and considered that The Book of the Law was a "colossal wish fulfillment" on Crowley's part. Regardie noted that in 1906 Crowley wrote: "It has struck me – in connection with reading Blake that Aiwass, etc. 'Force and Fire' is the very thing I lack. My 'conscience' is really an obstacle and a delusion, being a survival of heredity and education."

Regardie argued that because Crowley felt that his Fundamentalist upbringing instilled him in an overly rigid conscience, when he rebelled against Christianity "he must have yearned for qualities and characteristics diametrically opposed to his own. In The Book of the Law the wish is fulfilled." Charles R. Cammell, author of Aleister Crowley: The Man, the Mage, the Poet, wrote that The Book of the Law was "in part (but in part only) an emanation from Crowley's unconscious mind I can believe; for it bears a likeness to his own Daemonic personality."

Writer Israel Regardie and academic Joshua Gunn have argued that the stylistic similarities between The Book of the Law and Crowley's other writings are evidence that Crowley rather than a discarnate entity was the sole source of the book.

== Gematria ==
Crowley, being a Qabalist, labored to discover Aiwass's number within the system of gematria. Initially he believed that it was 78: "I had decided on AIVAS = 78, the number of Mezla, the influence from the highest unity, and therefore suitable enough as the title of a messenger from Him." After receiving a letter from a stranger, the typographer and publisher Samuel A. Jacobs (whose Golden Eagle Press published the work of E. E. Cummings and others), and whose Hebrew name was Shmuel bar Aiwaz bie Yackou de Sherabad, Crowley asked the Hebrew spelling of Aiwaz. To Crowley's astonishment and delight, it was OIVZ, which equated to 93, the number of Thelema itself, and "also that of the Lost Word of freemasonry, which I had re-discovered". Crowley remained perplexed, though, since the spelling of the name in AL was "Aiwass" not "AIVAS", which does not add up to 93. When Crowley decided to use the Greek Qabalah, he discovered that:

... its value is 418! and this is the number of the Magical Formula of the Aeon. It represents the practice of the Book as 93 does the theory. It is now evident with what inconceivable ingenuity AIWAZ has arranged his expression. He is not content to give one spelling of his name, however potent; he gives two which taken together are not merely twice as significant as either alone, but more so, in a degree which is beyond me to calculate.

According to Israel Regardie, Tav is pronounced /s/ when without a dagesh, therefore a Hebrew spelling that enumerates to 418 is:

(tav) 400 + (aleph) 1 + (waw) 6 + (yod) 10 + (aleph) 1 = 418

== See also ==
- Aleister Crowley bibliography
