= Aeon (Thelema) =

Concept of time in the religion of Thelema

In the religion of Thelema, it is believed that the history of humanity can be divided into a series of aeons, each of which was accompanied by its own forms of "magical and religious expression".

The first of these was the Aeon of Isis, which Thelemites believed occurred during prehistory and which saw mankind worshipping a Great Goddess, symbolised by the ancient Egyptian deity Isis. In Thelemite beliefs, this was followed by the Aeon of Osiris, a period that took place in the classical and mediaeval centuries, when humanity worshipped a singular male god, symbolised by the Egyptian god Osiris, and was therefore dominated by patriarchal values. The third aeon is the Aeon of Horus, controlled by the child god, symbolised by Horus.

In the New Aeon, prophesied by Aleister Crowley during his lifetime throughout his esoteric and occult writings, Thelemites believe that humanity shall leave behind the tyranny of Abrahamic religions and enter a time of greater consciousness and self-actualization. Within the Thelemite religion, each of these aeons is believed to be "characterized by their [own specific] magical formula", the use of which "is very important and fundamental to the understanding of Thelemic Magick".

== Aeons ==
=== Aeon of Isis ===
The first Aeon, of Isis, was maternal. The female aspect of the Godhead was revered due to a mostly matriarchal society and the idea that "Mother Earth" nourished, clothed and housed man closed in the womb of Matrix. It was characterized by pagan worship of the Mother and Nature. In his Equinox of the Gods Crowley describes this period as "simple, quiet, easy, and pleasant; the material ignores the spiritual."

Lon Milo DuQuette remarked that this aeon was "the Age of the Great Goddess", and that it had originated in prehistory, reaching its zenith at "approximately 2400 B.C." Continuing with this idea, he remarked that this period was when "the cult of the Great Goddess" was truly universal. She was worshipped by countless cultures under myriad names and forms. It would also be a mistake for us to conclude that the magical formula of this period manifested exclusively through the worship of any particular anthropomorphic female deity. For, like every aeon, the magical formula of the Aeon of Isis was founded upon mankind's interpretation of the 'perceived facts' of nature, and our Isian-age progenitors perceived nature as a continuous process of spontaneous growth."

=== Aeon of Osiris ===
The classical and medieval Aeon of Osiris is considered to be dominated by the paternal principle and the formula of the Dying God. This Aeon was characterized by that of self-sacrifice and submission to the Father God while man spoke of his father and mother. Crowley says of this Aeon in his Heart of the Master:

Formula of Osiris, whose word is IAO; so that men worshiped Man, thinking him subject to Death, and his victory dependent upon Resurrection. Even so conceived they of the Sun as slain and reborn with every day, and every year.

Crowley also says of the Aeon of Osiris:

...the second [period] is of suffering and death: the spiritual strives to ignore the material. Christianity and all cognate religions worship death, glorify suffering, deify corpses.

=== Aeon of Horus ===
The modern Aeon of Horus is portrayed as a time of self-realization as well as a growing interest in all things spiritual, and is considered to be dominated by the principle of the child. The Word of its Law is Thelema (will), which is complemented by Agape (love), and its formula is Abrahadabra. Individuality and finding the individual's True Will are the dominant aspects; its formula is that of growth, in consciousness and love, toward self-realization. Concerning the Aeon of Horus, Crowley wrote:

... the crowned and conquering child, who dieth not, nor is reborn, but goeth radiant ever upon His Way. Even so goeth the Sun: for as it is now known that night is but the shadow of the Earth, so Death is but the shadow of the Body, that veileth his Light from its bearer.

And also, in his Little Essays Toward Truth:

The Aeon of Horus is here: and its first flower may well be this: that, freed of the obsession of the doom of the Ego in Death, and of the limitation of the Mind by Reason, the best men again set out with eager eyes upon the Path of the Wise, the mountain track of the goat, and then the untrodden Ridge, that leads to the ice-gleaming pinnacles of Mastery!

Lon Milo DuQuette commented on the connection that the Aeon of Horus had to the Age of Aquarius when he stated that "Yes, [the Aeon of Horus] is coincidental to what astrologers and songwriters call the Age of Aquarius and what millions of others refer to simply as the New Age. But it would be a mistake to view this new aeon simply as another tick on a great cosmic clock. The Age of Aquarius, profoundly significant as it is, is only one aspect of a far greater new spiritual age."

Sometimes Crowley compared the Word of Horus with other formulas, whose reigns appear to overlap with the Aeon of Osiris and/or Isis. From his The Confessions of Aleister Crowley:

There are many magical teachers but in recorded history we have scarcely had a dozen Magi in the technical sense of the word. They may be recognized by the fact that their message may be formulated as a single word, which word must be such that it overturns all existing beliefs and codes. We may take as instances the Word of Buddha-Anatta (absence of an atman or soul), which laid its axe to the root of Hindu cosmology, theology and psychology, and incidentally knocked away the foundation of the caste system; and indeed of all accepted morality. Mohammed, again, with the single word Allah, did the same thing with polytheisms, patently pagan or camouflaged as Christian, of his period.

Similarly, Aiwass, uttering the word Thelema (with all its implications), destroys completely the formula of the Dying God. Thelema implies not merely a new religion, but a new cosmology, a new philosophy, a new ethics. It co-ordinates the disconnected discoveries of science, from physics to psychology, into a coherent and consistent system.

=== Future aeons ===
Some Thelemites believe that the Aeon of Ma'at will succeed the present one. According to one of Crowley's early students, Charles Stansfeld Jones (a.k.a. Frater Achad), the Aeon of Ma'at has already arrived or overlaps the present Aeon of Horus.

According to Crowley, the Aeon of Horus is succeeded by that of Thmaist:

I may now point out that the reign of the crowned and Conquering Child is limited in time by The Book of the Law itself. We learn that Horus will be in his turn succeeded by Thmaist, the Double-Wanded One; she who shall bring the candidates to full initiation, and though we know little of her peculiar characteristics, we know at least that her name is justice.

== See also ==
- Astrological age – Time period in ancient historical and astrological theories of time
- Astrotheology – Theological discipline
- Ceremonial magic – Variety of rituals of magic
- Great Year – Length of time
- IPSOS – Sacred text in Thelema
