= Hadit =

Thelemic deity

Hadit /ˈhædit/ (sometimes Had) is a deity in Thelema, a Western esoteric and occult social or spiritual philosophy and a new religious movement founded in the early 1900s by Aleister Crowley (1875–1947), an English writer, mystic, occultist, and ceremonial magician. Hadit is the principal speaker of the second chapter of The Book of the Law, which was written or received by Aleister Crowley in 1904.

== Descriptions ==
Hadit identifies himself as the point in the center of the circle, the axle of the wheel, the cube in the circle, "the flame that burns in every heart of man, and in the core of every star", and the worshipper's own inner self. When juxtaposed with Nuit in The Book of the Law, Hadit represents each unique point-experience.

Hadit, "the Great God, the lord of the sky", is depicted on the Stele of Revealing in the form of the winged disk of the Sun, Horus of Behdet (also known as the Behdeti). However, while the ancient Egyptians treated the Sun and the other stars as separate, Thelema connects the sun-god Hadit with every individual star. Furthermore, The Book of the Law says: "Every man and every woman is a star."

Hadit is the Secret Seed. In The Book of the Law he says; "I am alone: there is no God where I am." He is "the flame that burns in every heart of man, and in the core of every star." He is identified with kundalini; in The Book of the Law he says, "I am the secret Serpent coiled about to spring: in my coiling there is joy. If I lift up my head, I and my Nuit are one. If I droop down mine head, and shoot forth venom, then is rapture of the earth, and I and the earth are one. There is great danger in me..."

== History ==
The earlier, Egyptian version, went by the name of Heru-Behdeti or Horus of Behdet (Edfu), Haidith in Greek. Thoth let him take the form of the solar disk to help a younger version of Horus—Re-Horakhty, or Ra-Hoor-Khuit—in a battle with Set and his army. Both versions of Horus appear in the Egyptian image that Thelemites call Stele 666, a Dynasty 25 or 26 offering stele formerly in the Boulaq Museum, but now in the Egyptian Museum in Cairo, also known as the Stele of Revealing.

== Identity ==
In Magick in Theory and Practice, Hadit is identified by Crowley as Satan. This assertion is made in a footnote where Crowley is discussing the Devil, who he asserts does not exist. He goes on to clarify his statements by explaining that the Devil is in reality a label for the God of any people that one dislikes, and that this fact has led to so much "confusion of thought" on the subject that Crowley prefers to:

let names stand as they are, and to proclaim simply that AIWAZ—the solar-phallic-hermetic "Lucifer"—is His own Holy Guardian Angel, and "The Devil" SATAN or HADIT, the Supreme Soul behind RA-HOOR-KHUIT the Sun, the Lord of our particular unit of the Starry Universe. This serpent, SATAN, is not the enemy of Man, but He who made Gods of our race, knowing Good and Evil; He bade 'Know Thyself!' and taught Initiation. He is "the Devil" of the Book of Thoth, and His emblem is BAPHOMET, the Androgyne who is the hieroglyph of arcane perfection.

== See also ==
- Heru-ra-ha – Deity in Thelema
- Naunet – Ancient Egyptian personification of the primordial watery abyss
