= Nuit =

Deity in Thelema

- Queen of Heaven; Queen of Space
- Symbol: Sky, Stars
- Gender: Female
- Consort: Hadit
- Offspring: Ra-Hoor-Khuit

Equivalents
- Egyptian: Nut

Nuit (alternatively Nu, Nut, or Nuith) is a goddess in Thelema, a Western esoteric quasi-religion. Nuit is the speaker in the first chapter of The Book of the Law, the sacred text written or received in 1904 by Aleister Crowley. Nuit is based on the Ancient Egyptian sky goddess Nut, who in Egyptian mythology arches over her brother/husband, Geb (Earth god). She is usually depicted as a naked woman who is covered with stars.

== In The Book of the Law ==
In Aleister Crowley’s The Book of the Law, the central sacred text of Thelema, Nuit is one part of a triad of deities, along with Hadit (her masculine counterpart), and Ra-Hoor-Khuit, or “the Crowned and Conquering Child”, who Thelemites believe are depicted on the Stele of Revealing. She has several titles, including "Our Lady of the Stars", and "Lady of the Starry Heaven". In The Book of the Law she says of herself: "I am Infinite Space, and the Infinite Stars thereof", and in other verses she is called "Queen of Heaven", and "Queen of Space". Nuit is symbolized by a sphere whose circumference is nowhere and whose center is everywhere. (Note: This idea is nearly identical to the definition of God attributed to Hermes Trismegistus and later Alain de Lille in the 12th century).) Hadit is the infinitely small point at the center of the sphere of Nuit.

== In Thelemic theology ==
Manon Hedenborg-White writes that "[...] Nuit and Hadit are constructed as gendered opposites in ritual and literature, and their divine functions and attributes are linked to their sex." She observes that

Claiming that Nuit is female and receptive and Hadit is male and active is thus not a mere description, but a performative utterance that creates these deities as gendered in the minds of those who experience them, and reproduces assumptions about what femininity and masculinity is. By disregarding other physical aspects that might otherwise define the deities and linking their sex to the human sexes of male and female in ritual, gender is established as a crucially important category in relating to the divine.

She goes on to note the practitioners of Thelema may subvert this view through polytheism, incorporating deities such as Kali from Hinduism as well as the Greek god Pan to represent different forms of femininity and masculinity. She also notes that one of her Thelemic informants questions the gendering of Nuit, calling it "merely a convenient metaphor". Another called the model "overly simplistic" and has devised their own more complex gender formulation. Hedenborg-White goes on to note that "studying contemporary Thelema requires sensitivity to the fact that Thelemites are not passively bound to orthodoxy in their religious practice."

== See also ==
- Abzu – Primeval sea in Mesopotamian mythology
- Book of Nut – Collection of ancient Egyptian astronomical texts
- Chinese theology – Chinese theological conception of Heaven
- Laws of Form – 1969 non-fiction book by G. Spencer-Brown
- Mark and space – States of a communications signal
- Nu – Ancient Egyptian personification of the primordial watery abyss
- Ohr – Term in the Jewish mystical tradition
- Śūnyatā – Philosophical concept of emptiness found in Asian religions
