= Thelema =

New religious movement founded by Aleister Crowley

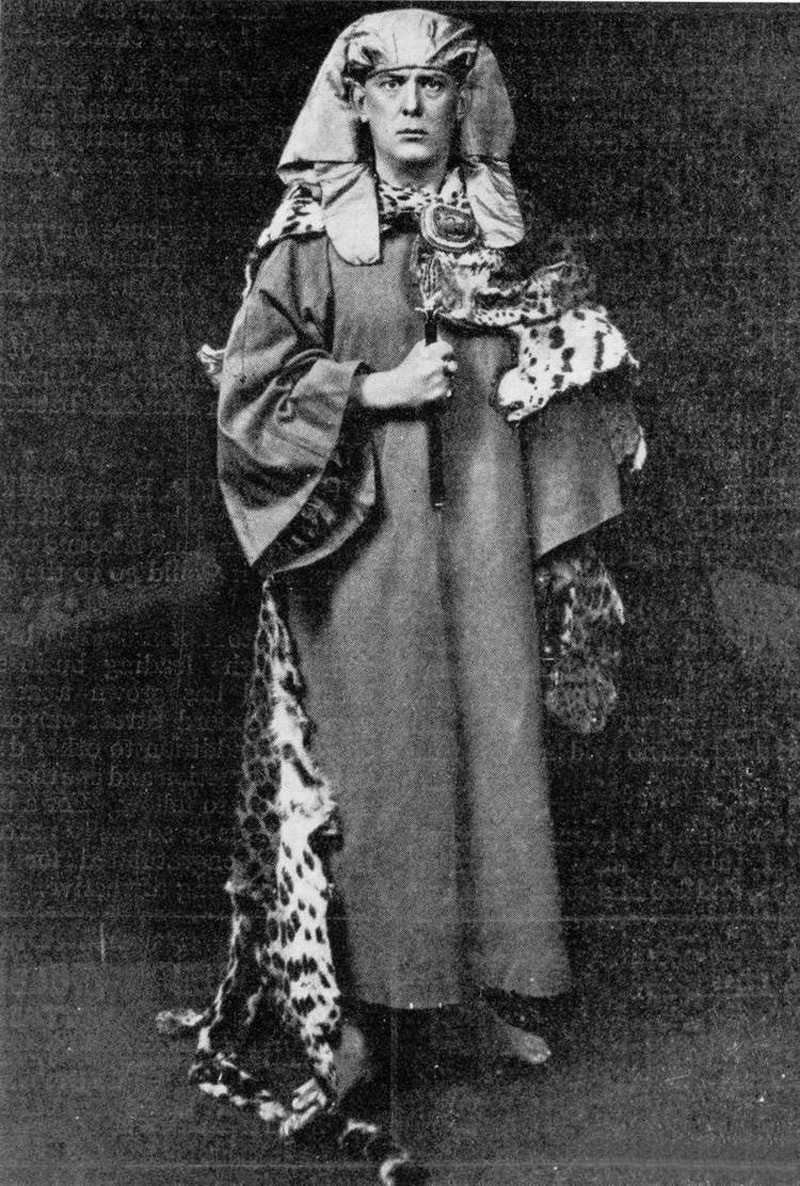
Aleister Crowley in 1910

Thelema (/θəˈliːmə/) is a Western esoteric and occult social and spiritual philosophy, and a new religious movement. It was founded in the early 1900s by Aleister Crowley (1875–1947), an English writer, mystic, occultist, and ceremonial magician. Central to Thelema is the concept of discovering and following one's True Will, a divine and individual purpose that transcends ordinary desires. Crowley's system begins with The Book of the Law, a text he maintained was dictated to him by a non-corporeal entity named Aiwass. This work outlines key principles, including the axioms "Do what thou wilt shall be the whole of the Law" and "love is the law, love under will", emphasizing personal freedom and the pursuit of one's true path.

The Thelemic cosmology features deities inspired by ancient Egyptian religion. The highest deity is Nuit, the night sky symbolized as a naked woman covered in stars, representing the ultimate source of possibilities. Hadit, the infinitely small point, symbolizes manifestation and motion. Ra-Hoor-Khuit, who is believed to be a form of Horus, represents the Sun and active energies of Thelemic magick. Crowley believed that discovering and following one's True Will is the path to self-realization and personal fulfillment, often referred to as the Great Work. The Creed of the Gnostic Mass also professes a belief in Chaos, Babalon, and Baphomet.

Magick is a central practice in Thelema, involving various physical, mental, and spiritual exercises aimed at uncovering one's True Will and enacting change in alignment with it. Practices such as rituals, yoga, and meditation are used to explore consciousness and achieve self-mastery. The Gnostic Mass, a central ritual in Thelema, mirrors traditional religious services but conveys Thelemic principles. Thelemites also observe specific holy days, such as the Equinoxes and the Feast of the Three Days of the Writing of the Book of the Law, commemorating the writing of Thelema's foundational text.

Post-Crowley figures like Jack Parsons, Kenneth Grant, James Lees, and Nema Andahadna have further developed Thelema, introducing new ideas, practices, and interpretations. Parsons conducted the Babalon Working to invoke the goddess Babalon, while Grant synthesized various traditions into his Typhonian Order. Lees created the English Qaballa, and Nema Andahadna developed Maat Magick.

== Historical precedents ==
The word θέλημα (thelēma) is rare in Classical Greek, where it "signifies the appetitive will: desire, sometimes even sexual", but it is frequent in the Septuagint. Early Christian writings occasionally use the word to refer to the human will, and even the will of the Devil, but it usually refers to the will of God. In his 5th-century sermon, Catholic philosopher and theologian Augustine of Hippo gave a similar instruction: "Love, and what you will, do." (Dilige et quod vis fac).

In the Renaissance, a character named "Thelemia" represents will or desire in the Hypnerotomachia Poliphili of the Dominican friar and writer Francesco Colonna. The protagonist Poliphilo has two allegorical guides, Logistica (reason) and Thelemia (will or desire). When forced to choose, he chooses fulfillment of his sexual will over logic. Colonna's work was a great influence on the Franciscan friar and writer François Rabelais, who in the 16th century used Thélème, the French form of the word, as the name of a fictional abbey in his novels, Gargantua and Pantagruel. The only rule of this Abbey was "fay çe que vouldras" ("Fais ce que tu veux", or, "Do what you will").

In the mid-18th century, Sir Francis Dashwood inscribed the adage on a doorway of his abbey at Medmenham, where it served as the motto of the Hellfire Club. Rabelais's Abbey of Thelema has been referred to by later writers Sir Walter Besant and James Rice, in their novel The Monks of Thelema (1878), and C. R. Ashbee in his utopian romance The Building of Thelema (1910).

=== Definitions ===
==== In Classical Greek ====
In Classical Greek there are two words for will: thelema (θέλημα) and boule (βουλή).

- Boule means 'determination', 'purpose', 'intention', 'counsel', or 'project'
- Thelema means 'divine will', 'inclination', 'desire', or 'pleasure'

The verb thelo appears very early (Homer, early Attic inscriptions) and has the meanings of "ready", "decide" and "desire" (Homer, 3, 272, also in the sexual sense).

==== In the New Testament ====
In the original Greek version of the New Testament the word thelema is used 62 or 64 times, twice in the plural (thelemata). Here, God's will is always and exclusively designated by the word thelema (θέλημα, mostly in the singular), as the theologian Federico Tolli points out by means of the Theological Dictionary of the New Testament of 1938 ("Your will be done on earth as it is in heaven").

=== François Rabelais and the Abbey of Thélème ===
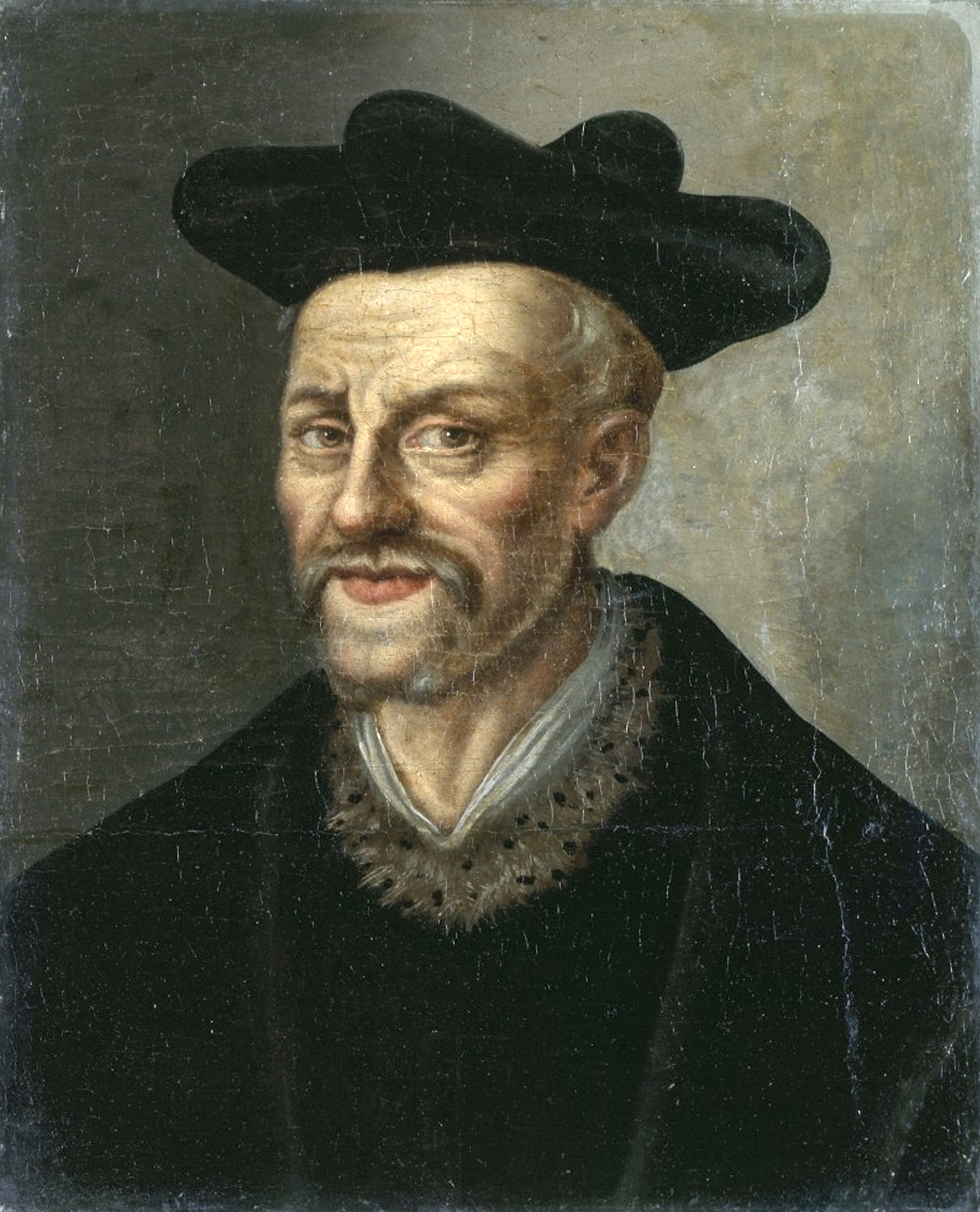
François Rabelais

François Rabelais was a Franciscan and later a Benedictine monk of the 16th century. Eventually he left the monastery to study medicine, and moved to the French city of Lyon in 1532. There he wrote Gargantua and Pantagruel, a connected series of books. They tell the story of two giants—a father (Gargantua) and his son (Pantagruel) and their adventures—written in an amusing, extravagant, and satirical vein.

Most critics today agree that Rabelais wrote from a Christian humanist perspective. The Crowley biographer Lawrence Sutin notes this when contrasting the French author's beliefs with the Thelema of Aleister Crowley. In the previously mentioned story of Thélème, which critics analyze as referring in part to the suffering of loyal Christian reformists or "evangelicals" within the French Church, the reference to the Greek word θέλημα "declares that the will of God rules in this abbey". Sutin writes that Rabelais was no precursor of Thelema, with his beliefs containing elements of Stoicism and Christian kindness.

In his first book (ch. 52–57), Rabelais writes of this Abbey of Thélème, built by the giant Gargantua. It is a classical utopia presented in order to critique and assess the state of the society of Rabelais's day, as opposed to a modern utopian text that seeks to create the scenario in practice. It is a utopia where people's desires are more fulfilled. Satirical, it also epitomises the ideals considered in Rabelais's fiction. The inhabitants of the abbey were governed only by their own free will and pleasure, the only rule being "Do What Thou Wilt". Rabelais believed that men who are free, well born and bred have honour, which intrinsically leads to virtuous actions. When constrained, their noble natures turn instead to remove their servitude, because men desire what they are denied.

Some modern Thelemites consider Crowley's work to build upon Rabelais's summary of the instinctively honourable nature of the Thelemite. Rabelais has been variously credited with the creation of the philosophy of Thelema, as one of the earliest people to refer to it. The current National Grand Master General of the U.S. Ordo Templi Orientis Grand Lodge has opined that:

Saint Rabelais never intended his satirical, fictional device to serve as a practical blueprint for a real human society ... Our Thelema is that of The Book of the Law and the writings of Aleister Crowley.

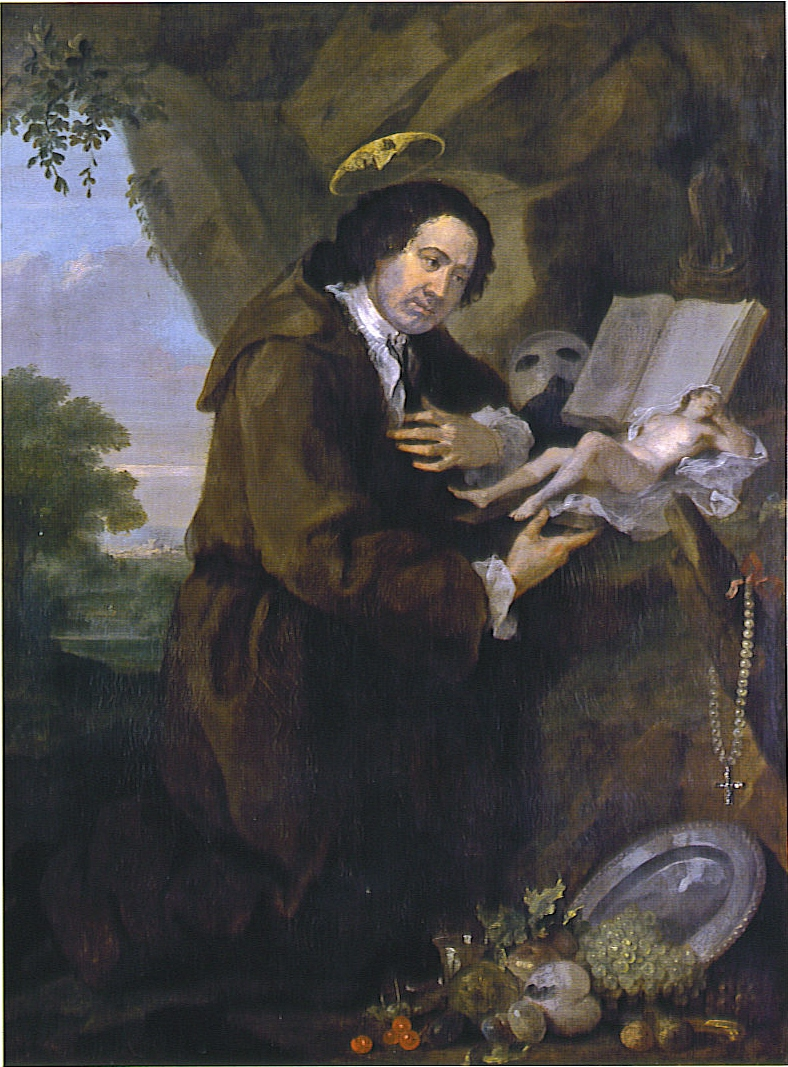
Portrait of Francis Dashwood, 11th Baron le Despencer, by William Hogarth from the late 1750s

Aleister Crowley wrote in The Antecedents of Thelema (1926), an incomplete work not published in his day, that Rabelais not only set forth the law of Thelema in a way similar to how Crowley understood it, but predicted and described in code Crowley's life and the holy text that he received, The Book of the Law. Crowley said the work he had received was deeper, showing in more detail the technique people should practice, and revealing scientific mysteries. He said that Rabelais confines himself to portraying an ideal, rather than addressing questions of political economy and similar subjects, which must be solved in order to realize the Law.

Rabelais is included among the Saints of Ecclesia Gnostica Catholica.

=== Francis Dashwood and the Hellfire Club ===
Sir Francis Dashwood adopted some of the ideas of Rabelais and invoked the same rule in French, when he founded a group called the Monks of Medmenham (better known as the Hellfire Club). An abbey was established at Medmenham, in a property which incorporated the ruins of a Cistercian abbey founded in 1201. The group was known as the Franciscans, not after Saint Francis of Assisi, but after its founder, Francis Dashwood, 11th Baron le Despencer. John Wilkes, George Dodington and other politicians were members. There is little direct evidence of what Dashwood's Hellfire Club practiced or believed. The one direct testimonial comes from John Wilkes, a member who never got into the chapter-room of the inner circle.

Sir Nathaniel Wraxall in his Historical Memoires (1815) accused the Monks of performing Satanic rituals, but these reports have been dismissed as hearsay. Daniel Willens argued that the group likely practiced Freemasonry, but also suggests Dashwood may have held secret Roman Catholic sacraments. He asks if Wilkes would have recognized a genuine Catholic Mass, even if he saw it himself and even if the underground version followed its public model precisely.

Crowley’s system was built on his time in the Hermetic Order of the Golden Dawn (he joined in 1899), on Rosicrucian currents and on early Theosophical ideas from Helena Blavatsky and others.

== Beliefs ==
=== The Book of the Law ===
Aleister Crowley's rendition of the unicursal hexagram

Aleister Crowley's system of Thelema begins with The Book of the Law, which bears the official name Liber AL vel Legis. It was written in Cairo, Egypt, during his honeymoon with his new wife Rose Crowley (née Kelly). A small book, Liber AL vel Legis, contains just three chapters, each of which Crowley said he had written in exactly one hour—beginning at noon on April 8, April 9, and April 10, 1904, respectively. Crowley also maintained that the book was dictated to him by a non-corporeal entity named Aiwass, whom he later identified as his Holy Guardian Angel. Crowley stated that "no forger could have prepared so complex a set of numerical and literal puzzles" and that study of the text would dispel all doubts about the method of how the book was obtained.

Besides the reference to Rabelais made in the book, an analysis by Dave Evans found similarities to The Beloved of Hathor and Shrine of the Golden Hawk, a play by Florence Farr. Evans says this may have resulted from the fact that "both Farr and Crowley were thoroughly steeped in Golden Dawn imagery and teachings", and that Crowley probably knew the same materials that inspired some of Farr's motifs. Sutin also found similarities between Thelema and the work of W. B. Yeats, attributing this to "shared insight" and perhaps to the older man's knowledge of Crowley's work.

Crowley wrote several commentaries on The Book of the Law, the last of which he wrote in 1925. The latter commentary, dubbed "The Comment", warns against discussing the book's contents, states that all "questions of the Law are to be decided only by appeal to my writings", and is signed by Ankh-ef-en-Khonsu i.

Other core Thelemic works include The Vision and the Voice (1911) and the serial journal The Equinox (1919–23).

=== Axioms ===
Three statements from The Book of the Law distill the practice and ethics of Thelema. Of these statements, one in particular, known as the "Law of Thelema", forms the central doctrine of Thelema. "Do what thou wilt shall be the whole of the Law". The first statement is then supplemented by a second, follow-up statement: "Love is the law, love under will." These two statements are generally believed to be better understood in light of a third statement: "Every man and every woman is a star."

These three statements have specific meanings:

- "Do what thou wilt shall be the whole of the Law": Adherents of Thelema should seek out and follow their true path, known as their True Will.
- "Every man and every woman is a star": This refers to the body of light, which Plato described as being composed of the same substance as the stars. It implies that individuals doing their Wills are like stars in the universe—occupying a time and position in space, yet distinctly individual and having an independent nature largely without undue conflict with other stars.
- "Love is the law, love under will": The nature of the Law of Thelema is love, which Crowley wrote should be understood in the same sense as the Greek word agape. Both agape and thelema sum to 93 in Hermetic Qabalah. The phrase "love under will" is often abbreviated as "93/93", suggesting that "love under will" represents something akin to unity.

=== Cosmology ===
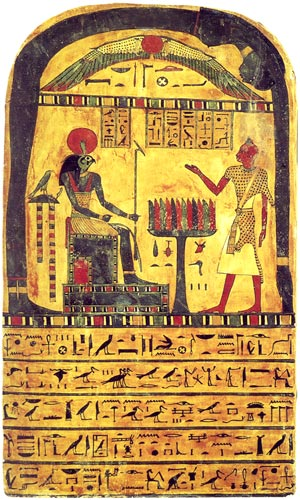
The Stèle of Revealing [front] depicting Nuit, Hadit as the winged globe, Ra-Hoor-Khuit seated on his throne, and the creator of the Stèle, the scribe Ankh-af-na-khonsu

Thelema places its principal gods and goddesses—three altogether—from Ancient Egyptian religion as the speakers presented in Liber AL vel Legis.

The highest deity in the theology of Thelema is the goddess Nuit (also spelled Nuith). She is envisioned as the night sky arching over the Earth, represented as a nude woman and typically depicted with stars covering her body. Nuit is conceived as the "Great Mother" and the ultimate source of all things, the collection of all possibilities, "Infinite Space, and the Infinite Stars thereof", and the circumference of an infinite circle or sphere. Nuit is derived from the Egyptian sky goddess Nut and is referred to poetically as "Our Lady of the Stars" and, in The Book of the Law, as "Queen of Space" and "Queen of Heaven".

The second principal deity of Thelema is the god Hadit, conceived as the infinitely small point, and the complement and consort of Nuit. Hadit symbolizes manifestation, motion, and time. He is also described in Liber AL vel Legis as "the flame that burns in every heart of man, and in the core of every star."

Hadit has sometimes been said to represent a "point-event" and all individual point-events within the body of Nuit. Hadit is said, in The Book of the Law, to be "perfect, being Not." Additionally, it is written of Nuit in Liber AL vel Legis that "men speak not of Thee [Nuit] as One but as None."

The third deity of Thelemic theology is Ra-Hoor-Khuit, a manifestation of the ancient Egyptian deity Horus. He is symbolized as a throned man with the head of a hawk who carries a wand. He is associated with the Sun and the active energies of Thelemic magick.

Other deities within the pantheon of Thelema are Hoor-paar-kraat (or Harpocrates), the god of silence and inner strength and the twin of Ra-Hoor-Khuit, as well as Babalon, the goddess of all pleasure known as the Virgin Whore, and Therion, the beast upon which Babalon rides who represents the wild animal within humankind and the force of nature.

=== True Will ===
According to Crowley, every individual has a True Will, which is to be distinguished from the ordinary wants and desires of the ego. True Will is essentially one's "calling" or "purpose" in life. "Do what thou wilt shall be the whole of the Law" for Crowley refers not to hedonism, fulfilling everyday desires, but to acting in response to that calling. According to Lon Milo DuQuette, a Thelemite is anyone who bases their actions on striving to discover and accomplish their true will, when a person does their True Will, it is like an orbit, their niche in the universal order, and the universe assists them:

But the Magician knows that the pure Will of every man and every woman is already in perfect harmony with the divine Will; in fact, they are one and the same.

For the individual to follow their True Will, the everyday self's socially instilled inhibitions may have to be overcome via deconditioning. Crowley believed that to discover the True Will, one had to free the desires of the subconscious mind from the control of the conscious mind, especially the restrictions placed on sexual expression, which he associated with the power of divine creation. He identified the True Will of each individual with the Holy Guardian Angel, a daimon unique to each individual. The spiritual quest to find what you are meant to do and do it is also known in Thelema as the Great Work.

=== Ethics ===
Liber AL vel Legis makes some standards of individual conduct clear. The primary of these is "Do what thou wilt", which is presented as the sum of the law and a right. Some interpreters of Thelema believe that this right includes an obligation to allow others to do their own wills without interference, but Liber AL vel Legis makes no clear statement on the matter. Crowley himself wrote that there was no need to detail the ethics of Thelema for everything springs from "Do what thou Wilt". Crowley wrote several additional documents presenting his personal beliefs regarding individual conduct in light of the Law of Thelema, some of which indeed address the topic interference with the will of others: Liber OZ, Duty, and Liber II.

Liber OZ enumerates some of the individual's rights implied by the overarching right, "Do what thou wilt". For every individual, these include the right to "live by one's own law"; "live in the way that one wills to do"; "work, play, and rest as one will"; "die when and how one will"; "eat and drink what one will"; "live where one will"; "move about the earth as one will"; "think, speak, write, draw, paint, carve, etch, mould, build, and dress as one will"; "love when, where and with whom one will"; and "kill those who would thwart these rights".

Duty is described as "A note on the chief rules of practical conduct to be observed by those who accept the Law of Thelema." It is not a numbered "Liber" as the other documents Crowley intended for A∴A∴; instead, it is listed as a document explicitly intended for Ordo Templi Orientis. There are four sections:

- A. Your Duty to Self: Describes the self as the center of the universe, with a call to learn about one's inner nature. Admonishes the reader to develop every faculty in a balanced way, establish one's autonomy, and devote oneself to the service of one's own True Will.
- B. Your Duty to Others: An admonishment to eliminate the illusion of separateness between oneself and all others, to fight when necessary, to avoid interfering with the Wills of others, to enlighten others when needed, and to worship the divine nature of all other beings.
- C. Your Duty to Mankind: States that the Law of Thelema should be the sole basis of conduct and that the laws of the land should aim to secure the greatest liberty for all individuals. Crime is described as being a violation of one's True Will.
- D. Your Duty to All Other Beings and Things: States that the Law of Thelema should be applied to all problems and used to decide every ethical question. It violates the Law of Thelema to use any animal or object for a purpose for which it is unfit or to ruin things that are useless for their purpose. Man can use natural resources, but this should not be done wantonly, or the breach of the law will be avenged.

In Liber II: The Message of the Master Therion, the Law of Thelema is summarized briefly as "Do what thou wilt—then do nothing else." Crowley describes the pursuit of True Will as not merely detaching from possible results but also involving tireless energy. It is Nirvana but in a dynamic rather than static form. The True Will is described as the individual's orbit, and if one seeks to do anything else, one will encounter obstacles, as doing anything other than the Will is a hindrance to it.

== Practice ==
The core of Thelemic thought is "Do what thou wilt". However, beyond this, there exists a wide range of interpretation of Thelema. Modern Thelema is a syncretic philosophy and religion, and many Thelemites try to avoid strongly dogmatic thinking. Crowley emphasized that each individual should follow their own inherent "True Will", rather than blindly following his teachings, saying he did not wish to found a flock of sheep. Thus, contemporary Thelemites may practice more than one religion, including Wicca, Gnosticism, Satanism, Setianism and Luciferianism. Many adherents of Thelema recognize correlations between Thelemic and other systems of spiritual thought; most borrow freely from the methods and practices of other traditions, including alchemy, astrology, qabalah, tantra, tarot divination and yoga. For example, Nu and Had are thought to correspond with the Tao and Teh of Taoism, Shakti and Shiva of the Hindu Tantras, Shunyata and Bodhicitta of Buddhism, Ain Soph and Kether in the Hermetic Qabalah.

=== Magick ===
The Tree of Life, important in the magical order A∴A∴ as the degrees of advancement in are related to it

Thelemic magick is a system of physical, mental, and spiritual exercises which practitioners believe are of benefit. Crowley defined magick as "the Science and Art of causing Change to occur in conformity with Will", and spelled it with a 'k' to distinguish it from stage magic. He recommended magick as a means for discovering the True Will. Generally, magical practices in Thelema are designed to assist in finding and manifesting the True Will, although some include celebratory aspects as well. Crowley believed that after discovering the True Will, the magician must also remove any elements of himself that stand in the way of its success.

Crowley was a prolific writer, integrating Eastern practices with Western magical practices from the Hermetic Order of the Golden Dawn. He recommended a number of these practices to his followers, including: basic yoga (asana and pranayama); rituals of his own devising or based on those of the Golden Dawn, such as the lesser ritual of the pentagram, for banishing and invocation; Liber Samekh, a ritual for the invocation of the Holy Guardian Angel; eucharistic rituals such as the Gnostic Mass and The Mass of the Phoenix; and Liber Resh, consisting of four daily adorations to the sun. He also discussed sex magick and sexual gnosis in various forms involving masturbation and sexual intercourse between heterosexual and homosexual partners; practices which are among his suggestions for those in the higher degrees of Ordo Templi Orientis.

One goal in the study of Thelema within the magical Order of the A∴A∴ is for the magician to obtain the knowledge and conversation of the Holy Guardian Angel: conscious communication with their own personal daimon, thus gaining knowledge of their True Will. The chief task for one who has achieved this goes by the name of "crossing the abyss"; completely relinquishing the ego. If the aspirant is unprepared, he will cling to the ego instead, becoming a Black Brother. According to Crowley, the Black Brother slowly disintegrates, while preying on others for his own self-aggrandisement.

Crowley taught skeptical examination of all results obtained through meditation or magick, at least for the student. He tied this to the necessity of keeping a magical record or diary, that attempts to list all conditions of the event. Remarking on the similarity of statements made by spiritually advanced people of their experiences, he said that fifty years from his time they would have a scientific name based on "an understanding of the phenomenon" to replace such terms as "spiritual" or "supernatural". Crowley stated that his work and that of his followers used "the method of science; the aim of religion", and that the genuine powers of the magician could in some way be objectively tested. This idea has been taken on by later practitioners of Thelema. They may consider that they are testing hypotheses with each magical experiment. The difficulty lies in the broadness of their definition of success, in which they may see as evidence of success things which a non-magician would not define as such, leading to confirmation bias. Crowley believed he could demonstrate, by his own example, the effectiveness of magick in producing certain subjective experiences that do not ordinarily result from taking hashish, enjoying oneself in Paris, or walking through the Sahara desert. It is not strictly necessary to practice ritual techniques to be a Thelemite, as due to the focus of Thelemic magick on the True Will, Crowley stated "every intentional act is a magickal act."

=== Gnostic Mass ===
Crowley wrote 'The Gnostic Mass' — technically called Liber XV or "Book 15" — in 1913 while travelling in Moscow, Russia. The structure is similar to the Mass of the Eastern Orthodox Church and Roman Catholic Church, communicating the principles of Thelema. It is the central rite of Ordo Templi Orientis and its ecclesiastical arm, Ecclesia Gnostica Catholica.

=== Holidays ===
The Book of the Law gives several holy days to be observed by Thelemites. There are no established or dogmatic ways to celebrate these days, so as a result Thelemites will often take to their own devices or celebrate in groups, especially within Ordo Templi Orientis. These holy days are usually observed on the following dates:

- March 20. The Feast of the Supreme Ritual, which celebrates the Invocation of Horus, the ritual performed by Crowley on this date in 1904 that inaugurated the New Aeon.
- March 20-21. The Equinox of the Gods, which is commonly referred to as the Thelemic New Year (although some celebrate the New Year on April 8). Although the equinox and the Invocation of Horus often fall on the same day, they are often treated as two different events. This date is the Autumnal equinox in the Southern Hemisphere.
- April 8 through April 10. The Feast of the Three Days of the Writing of the Book of the Law. These three days are commemorative of the three days in the year 1904 during which Aleister Crowley wrote The Book of the Law. One chapter was written each day, the first being written on April 8, the second on April 9, and the third on April 10. Although there is no official way of celebrating any Thelemic holiday, this particular feast day is usually celebrated by reading the corresponding chapter on each of the three days, usually at noon.
- June 20-21. The Summer solstice in the Northern Hemisphere and the Winter solstice in the Southern Hemisphere.
- August 12. The Feast of the Prophet and His Bride. This holiday commemorates the marriage of Aleister Crowley and his first wife Rose Edith Crowley. Rose was a key figure in the writing of The Book of the Law.
- September 22-23. The Autumnal equinox in the Northern Hemisphere and the Vernal Equinox in the Southern Hemisphere.
- October 12. The Feast for Aleister Crowley's Life / CrowleyMass. This day commemorates the birth of Aleister Crowley, in 1875, at Leamington Spa, Warwickshire, England.
- December 21-22. The Winter solstice in the Northern Hemisphere and the Summer Solstice in the Southern Hemisphere.
- The Feast for Life, celebrated at the birth of a Thelemite and on birthdays.
- The Feast for Fire/The Feast for Water. These feast days are usually taken as being when a child hits puberty and steps unto the path of adulthood. The Feast for Fire is celebrated for a male, and the Feast for Water for a female.
- The Feast for Death, celebrated on the death of a Thelemite and on the anniversary of their death. Crowley's Death is celebrated on December 1.

=== Greetings ===
The number 93 is of great significance in Thelema. The central philosophy of Thelema is in two phrases from Liber AL: "do what thou wilt shall be the whole of the law" and "love is the law, love under will". Crowley urged their use in everyday communications, and himself used them to greet people. Today, rather than using the full phrases, Thelemites often use numerological abbreviations to shorten these greeting in informal contexts, a practice Crowley also applied in his informal written correspondences. The two primary terms in these statements are 'will' and 'love', respectively. Using the Greek technique of isopsephy, which applies a numerical value to each letter, the letters of words thelema ('will') and agape ('love') each sum to 93:

- Thelema: Θελημα = 9 + 5 + 30 + 8 + 40 + 1 = 93
- Agapé: Αγαπη = 1 + 3 + 1 + 80 + 8 = 93

In this way, the first phrase is abbreviated to "93" while the second is abbreviated to "93 93/93", with the division "93/93" symbolizing love "under" will.

== Post-Crowley developments ==
Aleister Crowley was highly prolific and wrote on the subject of Thelema for over 35 years, and many of his books remain in print. During his time, there were several others who wrote on the subject, including U.S. O.T.O. Grand Master Charles Stansfeld Jones, whose works on Qabalah are still in print, and Major-General J. F. C. Fuller. Subsequent to Crowley, a number of figures have made significant contributions to Thelema. Each has their own following within the broader Thelemic community.

=== Major orders ===
- The Ordo Templi Orientis (O.T.O.) adopted The Book of the Law as its central scripture in the 1920s.
- The A∴A∴—co-founded by Crowley and George Cecil Jones in 1906—was established to teach the graded system of attainment spelled out in The Equinox.

=== Jack Parsons ===
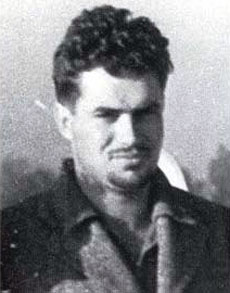
Parsons in 1941

John Whiteside Parsons (1914–1952) was an American rocket engineer, chemist, and Thelemite occultist. Parsons converted to Thelema, and together with his first wife, Helen Northrup, joined the Agape Lodge, the Californian branch of Ordo Templi Orientis (O.T.O.), in 1941. At Crowley's bidding, Parsons replaced Wilfred Talbot Smith as its leader in 1942 and ran the Lodge from his mansion on Orange Grove Boulevard.

Parsons identified four obstacles that prevented humans from achieving and performing their True Will, all of which he connected with fear: the fear of incompetence, the fear of the opinion of others, the fear of hurting others, and the fear of insecurity. He insisted that these must be overcome, writing that "The Will must be freed of its fetters. The ruthless examination and destruction of taboos, complexes, frustrations, dislikes, fears and disgusts hostile to the Will is essential to progress."

The project was based on the ideas of Crowley, and his description of a similar project in his 1917 novel Moonchild. (Note: Urban (2006), pp. 135–137: "The ultimate goal of these operations, carried out during February and March 1946, was to give birth to the magical being, or 'moonchild,' described in Crowley's works. Using the powerful energy of IX degree Sex Magick, the rites were intended to open a doorway through which the goddess Babalon herself might appear in human form.") The rituals performed drew largely upon rituals and sex magic described by Crowley. Crowley was in correspondence with Parsons during the course of the Babalon Working, and warned Parsons of his potential overreactions to the magic he was performing, while simultaneously deriding Parsons' work to others.

A brief text entitled Liber 49, self-referenced within the text as The Book of Babalon, was written by Jack Parsons as a transmission from the goddess or force called 'Babalon' received by him during the Babalon Working. Parsons wrote that Liber 49 constituted a fourth chapter of Crowley's Liber AL Vel Legis (The Book of the Law), the holy text of Thelema.

=== Kenneth Grant ===
Grant in the library of his Golders Green home, taken by Jan Magee in 1978

Kenneth Grant (1924–2011) was an English ceremonial magician and advocate of the Thelemic religion. A poet, novelist, and writer, he founded his own Thelemic organisation, the Typhonian Ordo Templi Orientis—later renamed the Typhonian Order—with his wife Steffi Grant.

Grant drew eclectically on a range of sources in devising his teachings. Although based in Thelema, Grant's Typhonian tradition has been described as "a bricolage of occultism, Neo-Vedanta, Hindu tantra, Western sexual magic, Surrealism, ufology and Lovecraftian gnosis". Grant promoted what he termed the Typhonian or Draconian tradition of magic, and wrote that Thelema was only a recent manifestation of this wider tradition. In his books, he portrayed the Typhonian tradition as the world's oldest spiritual tradition, writing that it had ancient roots in Africa. The religious studies scholar Gordan Djurdjevic noted that Grant's historical claims regarding Typhonian history were "at best highly speculative" and lacked any supporting evidence; however he also suggested that Grant may never have intended these claims to be taken literally.

Grant wrote that Indian spiritual traditions like Tantra and Yoga correlate to Western esoteric traditions and that both stem from a core ancient source and have parallels in the perennial philosophy promoted by the Traditionalist School of esotericists. He believed that by mastering magic, one masters this illusory universe, gaining personal liberation and recognising that only the Self really exists. Doing so, according to Grant, leads to the discovery of one's True Will, the central focus of Thelema. Grant further wrote that the realm of the Self was known as 'the Mauve Zone', and that it could be reached while in a state of deep sleep, where it has the symbolic appearance of a swamp. He also believed that the reality of consciousness, which he deemed the only true reality, was formless and thus presented as a void, although he also taught that it was symbolised by the Hindu goddess Kali and the Thelemic goddess Nuit.

Grant's views on sex magic drew heavily on the importance of sexual dimorphism among humans and the subsequent differentiation of gender roles. Grant taught that the true secret of sex magic were bodily secretions, the most important of which was a woman's menstrual blood. In this he differed from Crowley, who viewed semen as the most important genital secretion. Grant referred to female sexual secretions as kalas, a term adopted from Sanskrit. He thought that because women have kalas, they have oracular and visionary powers. The magical uses of female genital secretions are a recurring theme in Grant's writings.

=== James Lees ===
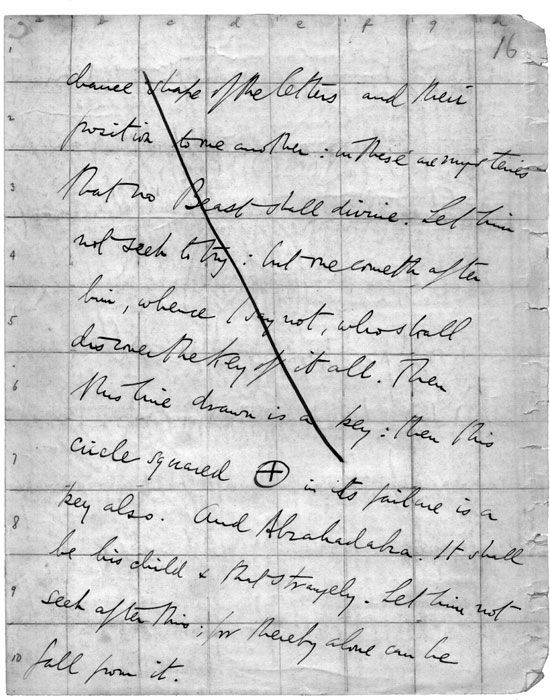
The 'grid' page of Liber AL's manuscript

James Lees (August 22, 1939 - 2015) was an English ceremonial magician known for creating the system he called English Qaballa. In November 1976, Lees explained how he had discovered the "order & value of the English Alphabet." Following this, Lees founded the order O∴A∴A∴ in order to assist others in the pursuit of their own spiritual paths. The first public report of the system known as English Qaballa (EQ) was published in 1979 by Ray Sherwin in an editorial in the final issue of his journal, The New Equinox. Lees subsequently assumed the role of publisher of The New Equinox and, starting in 1981, published additional material about the EQ system over the course of five issues of the journal, extending into 1982.

The "order & value" proposed by James Lees lays the letters out on the grid superimposed on the page of manuscript of Liber AL on which this verse (Ch. III, v. 47) appears (sheet 16 of Chapter III). Also appearing on this page are a diagonal line and a circled cross. The Book of the Law states that the book should only be printed with Crowley's hand-written version included, suggesting that there are mysteries in the "chance shape of the letters and their position to one another" of Crowley's handwriting. Whichever top-left to bottom-right diagonal is read the magical order of the letters is obtained.

Little, if any, further material on English Qaballa was published until the appearance of Jake Stratton-Kent's book, The Serpent Tongue: Liber 187, in 2011. This was followed in 2016 by The Magickal Language of the Book of the Law: An English Qaballa Primer by Cath Thompson. An account of the creation, exploration, and continuing research and development of the system up to 2010, by James Lees and members of his group in England, is detailed in her 2018 book, All This and a Book.

=== Nema Andahadna ===
Nema Andahadna (1939–2018) practiced and wrote about magick (magical working, as defined by Aleister Crowley) for over thirty years. In 1974, she said she had channelled a short book called Liber Pennae Praenumbra.

From her experience with Thelemic magick, she developed her own system of magic called "Maat Magick" which has the aim of transforming the human race. In 1979, she co-founded the Horus-Maat Lodge. The Lodge and her ideas have been featured in the writings of Kenneth Grant.

Her writings have appeared in many publications, including the Cincinnati Journal of Ceremonial Magick, Aeon, and Starfire. According to Donald Michael Kraig:

Nema has been one of the most influential occultists of the last quarter century although most occultists have never read her works. What Nema has done is influence those who have been writers and teachers. They, in turn, influenced the rest of us.

== See also ==
- Sri Sabhapati Swami – Indian yoga teacher
- Wiccan Rede – Wicca moral statement
- Worship of heavenly bodies – Worship of stars and other heavenly bodies as deities
- Samuel Liddell MacGregor Mathers – British occultist (1854–1918)
