= Aleister Crowley bibliography =

Aleister Crowley (12 October 1875 – 1 December 1947) was an English writer, not only on the topic of Thelema and magick, but also on philosophy, politics, and culture. He was a published poet and playwright and left behind many personal letters and daily journal entries. Most of Crowley's published works entered the public domain in 2018.

== 1875–1947 ==
Crowley published the following books during his lifetime:

- White Stains: The Literary Remains of George Archibald Bishop, a Neuropath of the Second Empire. Amsterdam: Leonard Smithers. 1898.
- Collected Works of Aleister Crowley. Vol. I. Foyers: Society for the Propagation of Religious Truth. 1905.
- Collected Works of Aleister Crowley. Vol. II. Foyers: Society for the Propagation of Religious Truth. 1906.
- Collected Works of Aleister Crowley. Vol. III. Foyers: Society for the Propagation of Religious Truth. 1907.
- Konx Om Pax: Essays in Light. Newcastle upon Tyne: Walter Scott Publishing Company. 1907.
- Tannhäuser: A Story of All Time. Foyers: Society for the Propagation of Religious Truth. 1907 – via Project Gutenberg.
- Clouds without Water. London: Privately printed by Philippe Renouard, Paris. 1909.
- ΘΕΛΗΜΑ. London: A∴A∴. 1909. 3 vols. First publication of Liber L vel Legis in v. III.
- The Equinox. Vol. I (1). London: Simpkin, Marshall, Hamilton, Kent & Co. Spring 1909.
- The Equinox. Vol. I (2). London: Simpkin, Marshall, Hamilton, Kent & Co. Autumn 1909.
- The Equinox. Vol. I (3). London: Simpkin, Marshall, Hamilton, Kent & Co. Spring 1910.
- The Equinox. Vol. I (4). London: Privately printed. Autumn 1910.
- The Equinox. Vol. I (5). London: Privately printed. Spring 1911.
- The Equinox. Vol. I (6). London: Wieland & Co. Autumn 1911.
- The Equinox. Vol. I (7). London: Wieland & Co. Spring 1912.
- The Equinox. Vol. I (8). London: Wieland & Co. Autumn 1912.
- The Equinox. Vol. I (9). London: Wieland & Co. Spring 1913.
- The Equinox. Vol. I (10). London: Wieland & Co. Autumn 1913.
- The Book of Lies, which is also falsely called Breaks. London: Wieland & Co. 1913.
- "The Blue Equinox". The Equinox. III (1). Detroit: Universal Publishing Co. Spring 1919.
- The Diary of a Drug Fiend. London: W. Collins Sons & Co. 1922. Boston: E. P. Dutton. 1923.
- Magick in Theory and Practice. Paris: Lecram Press. 1929.
- Moonchild. London: Mandrake Press. 1929.
- The Spirit of Solitude: An Autohagiography. London: Mandrake Press. 1929. 2 vols.
- The Stratagem and other Stories. London: Mandrake Press. 1929.
- "The Equinox of the Gods". The Equinox. III (3). London: Ordo Templi Orientis. 1936.
- The Heart of the Master. London: Ordo Templi Orientis. 1938.
- Little Essays Toward Truth. London: Ordo Templi Orientis. 1938.
- "Eight Lectures on Yoga". The Equinox. III (4). London: Ordo Templi Orientis. 1939.
- "The Book of Thoth". The Equinox. III (5). London: Ordo Templi Orientis. 1944.

== Posthumous editions (1947–present) ==
=== Books ===
The following is a list of notable editions published after Crowley's death:

1950s

- Germer, Karl J., ed. (1952). The Vision and the Voice (1st ed.). Barstow, California: Thelema Publishing Company. With an introduction by Israel Regardie.
- Germer, Karl J., ed. (1953). "The Gospel According to St Bernard Shaw". The Equinox. III (2). Thelema Publishing Company.
- Germer, Karl J., ed. (1954). Magick Without Tears. Hampton, New Jersey: Thelema Publishing Company.

1960s

- Germer, Karl J., ed. (1962). The Book of Lies [with commentary]. Ilfracombe, Devon: The Hayden Press.
- Germer, Karl J., ed. (1962). "Liber Aleph vel CXI: The Book of Wisdom or Folly". The Equinox. III (6). West Point, California: Thelema Publishing Company.
- Crowley, Aleister (1969) [1944]. The Book of Thoth: A Short Essay on the Tarot of the Egyptians. Illustrated by Lady Frieda Harris (reprint ed.). New York: Samuel Weiser.
- Symonds, John; Grant, Kenneth, eds. (1969). The Confessions of Aleister Crowley: An Autohagiography. London: Jonathan Cape. ISBN 978-0224613347.

1970s

- Parsons Smith, Helen, ed. (1971). "Shih Yi: A Critical and Mnemonic Paraphrase of the Yî King by Ko Yuen". The Equinox. III (7). Oceanside, California: Monthelema.
- Symonds, John; Grant, Kenneth, eds. (1972). The Magical Record of the Beast 666: The Diaries of Aleister Crowley, 1914-1920. London: Duckworth. ISBN 0-7156-0636-0.
- Grant, Kenneth, ed. (1973). The Heart of the Master. Montreal: 93 Publishing. ISBN 0-919690-00-9.
- King, Francis, ed. (1973). The Secret Rituals of the O.T.O. (the "unauthorized" ed.). London & New York: C. W. Daniel Company / Samuel Weiser.
- Parsons Smith, Helen, ed. (1973). Khing Kang King: The Classic of Purity. Liber XXI. Kings Beach, California: Thelema Publications. ISBN 978-0913576076.
- Regardie, Israel, ed. (1973). Magick Without Tears. St. Paul: Llewellyn Publications. ISBN 978-0875421155.
- Regardie, Israel, ed. (1973). The Qabalah of Aleister Crowley: Three Texts. New York: Samuel Weiser. ISBN 0-87728-222-6.
- Symonds, John; Grant, Kenneth, eds. (1973). Magick. London: Routledge & Kegan Paul. ISBN 978-0710074232.
- Crowley, Aleister (1974) [1898–1913]. The Works of Aleister Crowley (reprint ed.). New York: Gordon Press. ISBN 0-87968-130-6. 13 vols.
- King, Francis, ed. (1974). Crowley on Christ. London: C. W. Daniel Co. ISBN 0-85207-131-0.
- Regardie, Israel, ed. (1974). Gems from the Equinox. St. Paul: LLewellyn Publications. ISBN 978-0875421131.
- Symonds, John; Grant, Kenneth, eds. (1974). Magical and Philosophical Commentaries on the Book of the Law. Montreal: 93 Publishing. ISBN 978-0919690011.
- Regardie, Israel, ed. (1975). The Law is for All: An Extended Commentary on The Book of the Law. St. Paul: Llewellyn. ISBN 978-0875421148.
- Crowley, Aleister (1976). The Book of the Law (the "little red book" ed.). York Beach, Maine: Samuel Weiser. ISBN 0-87728-334-6.
- Parsons Smith, Helen, ed. (1976). "The Tao Teh King, A New Translation". The Equinox. III (8). Kings Beach, California: Thelema Publications. ISBN 0-913576-06-9.
- Regardie, Israel, ed. (1977). 777 and Other Qabalistic Writings of Aleister Crowley. York Beach, Maine: Samuel Weiser. ISBN 0-87728-222-6.
- Skinner, Stephen, ed. (1979). The Magical Diaries of Aleister Crowley: Tunisia 1923. York Beach, Maine: Samuel Weiser. ISBN 0-87728-358-3.

1980s

- Alpha, Hymenaeus, ed. (1983). "The Holy Books of Thelema". The Equinox. III (9). York Beach, Maine: Samuel Weiser. ISBN 0-87728-579-9.
- Regardie, Israel, ed. (1983). Aha! Being Liber CCXLII. Phoenix: Falcon Press. ISBN 978-0941404297.
- Regardie, Israel, ed. (1985). Eight Lectures on Yoga. Phoenix: Falcon Press. ISBN 0-941404-36-6.
- Regardie, Israel, ed. (1985). The World's Tragedy. Phoenix: Falcon Press. ISBN 0-941404-18-8.
- Starr, Martin P., ed. (1987). The Scrutinies of Simon Iff. Chicago: Teitan Press. ISBN 0-933429-02-9.

1990s

- Beta, Hymenaeus, ed. (1990). The Equinox. Vol. III (10). York Beach, Maine: Weiser Books. ISBN 978-0877287193.
- Richmond, Keith, ed. (1990). The Rites of Eleusis. Thame: Mandrake Press. ISBN 1-872736-02-5.
- Starr, Martin P., ed. (1990). Amrita: Essays in Magical Rejuvenation. Kings Beach, California: Thelema Publications. ISBN 0-913576-18-2.
- Starr, Martin P., ed. (1990). Konx Om Pax: Essays in Light. Chicago: Teitan Press. ISBN 0-933429-04-5.
- Beta, Hymenaeus, ed. (1991). "The Equinox of the Gods and Eight Lectures on Yoga". The Equinox. III (3–4). New York: 93 Publishing.
- DuQuette, Lon Milo; Hyatt, Christopher, eds. (1991). Enochian World of Aleister Crowley: Enochian Sex Magick. Scottsdale: New Falcon Publications. ISBN 1-56184-029-7.
- Wasserman, James, ed. (1993). Aleister Crowley and the Practice of the Magical Diary. Scottsdale: New Falcon Publications. ISBN 978-1561840687.
- Crowley, Aleister; Blavatsky, H. P.; Fuller, J. F. C.; Jones, Charles Stansfeld (1996). "Commentaries on the Holy Books and Other Papers". The Equinox. IV (1). York Beach, Maine: Samuel Weiser. ISBN 0-87728-888-7.
- Wilkinson, Louis; Beta, Hymenaeus, eds. (1996). The Law is for All: The Authorized Popular Commentary of Liber AL vel Legis sub figura CCXX, The Book of the Law. Tempe: New Falcon Publications. ISBN 1-56184-090-4.
- Beta, Hymenaeus, ed. (1997). Magick: Liber ABA, Book Four, Parts I-IV. York Beach, Maine: Samuel Weiser. ISBN 0-87728-919-0.
- Beta, Hymenaeus; Kaczynski, Richard, eds. (1998). The Revival of Magick and Other Essays. Tempe: New Falcon Publications. ISBN 1-56184-133-1.
- Crowley, Aleister; Neuburg, Victor B.; Desti, Mary (1998). "The Vision & the Voice: With Commentary and Other Papers". The Equinox. IV (2). York Beach, Maine: Samuel Weiser. ISBN 0-87728-887-9.

2000s

- Beta, Hymenaeus, ed. (2002) [1917]. The General Principles of Astrology. with Evangeline Adams. Boston: Weiser Books. ISBN 978-0877289081.
- Crowley, Aleister; Crowley, Rose Edith (2004). The Book of the Law: Liber AL vel Legis (Centennial ed.). Boston: Weiser Books. ISBN 978-1578633081.

=== Poetry ===
Gordon Press collection, 13 vols.

1. Songs of the Spirit. New York: Gordon Press. 1974 [1898]. ISBN 0-87968-220-5.
2. Jephthah. New York: Gordon Press. 1974 [1898]. ISBN 0-87968-217-5.
3. Jezebel, and Other Tragic Poems. New York: Gordon Press. 1974 [1899]. ISBN 0-87968-216-7.
4. The Soul of Osiris: Comprising the Temple of The Holy Ghost and The Mother's Tragedy. New York: Gordon Press. 1974 [1899]. ISBN 0-87968-177-2.
5. Tannhäuser. New York: Gordon Press. 1974 [1901].
6. Ahab, and Other Poems. New York: Gordon Press. 1974 [1902]. ISBN 0-87968-221-3.
7. The Argonauts. New York: Gordon Press. 1974 [1904]. ISBN 0-87968-222-1.
8. Orpheus: A Lyrical Legend. New York: Gordon Press. 1974 [1904]. ISBN 0-87968-176-4.
9. The Star and the Garter. New York: Gordon Press. 1974 [1904]. ISBN 0-87968-175-6.
10. The Sword of Song: Called by Christians, The Book of the Beast. New York: Gordon Press. 1974 [1904]. ISBN 0-87968-223-X.
11. Gargoyles: Being Strangely Wrought Images of Life and Death. New York: Gordon Press. 1974 [1907]. ISBN 0-87968-224-8.
12. Clouds without Water. New York: Gordon Press. 1974 [1909]. ISBN 0-87968-111-X.
13. Breaks. New York: Gordon Press. 1974 [1913].

Other editions

- Booth, Martin, ed. (1986). Aleister Crowley: Selected Poems. London: Crucible. ISBN 0-85030-456-3.
- Starr, Martin P., ed. (1986) [1904]. Snowdrops from a Curate's Garden. Chicago: Teitan Press. ISBN 0-933429-01-0.
- Starr, Martin P., ed. (1988). Golden Twigs (First collected ed.). Chicago: Teitan Press. ISBN 0-933429-03-7.
- Starr, Martin P., ed. (1991) [1910]. Bagh-i-Muattar: The Scented Garden of Abdullah the Satirist of Shiraz. Chicago: Teitan Press. ISBN 0-933429-05-3.
- Starr, Martin P., ed. (1992) [1910]. The Winged Beetle. Chicago: Teitan Press. ISBN 0-933429-06-1.
- Crowley, Aleister (2004) [Beta (1990)]. The Stone of Cybele: A "Golden Twigs" Story (First ed.). Syracuse: Luminist Publications.

== Libri of Aleister Crowley ==
Many of the important works of Aleister Crowley are in the form of Libri (lit. "books"), which are usually short documents consisting of core teachings, methodologies, practices, or Thelemic scripture. All the libri are given a number in the Roman numeral system, and those that are part of the A∴A∴ curriculum are assigned a "class" as follows:

- Class [A] consists of books of which may be changed not so much as the style of a letter: that is, they represent the utterance of an Adept entirely beyond the criticism of even the Visible Head of the Organization.
- Class [B] consists of books or essays which are the result of ordinary scholarship, enlightened and earnest.
- Class [C] consists of matter which is to be regarded rather as suggestive than anything else.
- Class [D] consists of the Official Rituals and Instructions.
- Class [E] consists of manifestos, broadsides, epistles and other public statements. Some publications are composite, and pertain to more than one class.

Many of the books and articles are major works of Aleister Crowley. This is a listing with liber number, Roman number, class, full title, and a short description.

Liber	No.	Class	Title and short description
I	1	A	Liber B vel Magi — This is an account of the Grade of Magus, the highest grade which it is ever possible to manifest in any way whatever upon this plane. Or so it is said by the Masters of the Temple.' Also known as The Book of the Magus.
II	2	E	The Message of The Master Therion — It explains the essence of the New Law in a very simple manner.
III	3	D	Liber III vel Jugorum — An instruction for the control of speech, action, and thought.
IV	4	ABDE	ABA, Book 4 — General account, in elementary terms, of magical and mystical powers in four parts: 1. Mysticism; 2. Magick (Elementary Theory); 3. Magick in Theory and Practice; 4. θΕΛΗΜΑ. The Law. The Equinox of the Gods.
V	5	D	Liber V vel Reguli — Being the Ritual of the Mark of the Beast: an incantation proper to invoke the Energies of the Æon of Horus, adapted for the daily use of the Magician of whatever grade.
VI	6	B	Liber O vel Manus et Sagittæ — The instructions given in this book are too loose to find a place in the Class D publications. Instructions given for elementary study of the Qabalah, Assumption of God forms, Vibration of Divine Names, the Rituals of Pentagram and Hexagram, and their uses in protection and invocation, a method of attaining astral visions so-called, and an instruction in the practice called Rising on the Planes.
VII	7	A	Liber Liberi vel Lapidis Lazuli, Adumbratio Kabbalæ Ægypt sub figura VII, Also known as The Book of Lapis Lazuli. — Being the Voluntary Emancipation of a certain Exempt Adept from his Adeptship. These are the Birth Words of the Master of the Temple. The nature of this book is sufficiently explained by its title. Its seven chapters are referred to the seven planets in the following order: Mars, Saturn, Jupiter, Sol, Mercury, Luna, Venus. Given in magical language an account of the Initiation of a Master of the Temple. This is the only parallel, for Beauty of Ecstasy, to "Liber LXV"."
VIII	8	D	The official instructions for invoking the Knowledge and Conversation of the Holy Guardian Angel; see CDXVIII (418).
IX	9	B	Liber E vel Exercitiorum — This book instructs the aspirant in the necessity of keeping a record. Suggests methods of testing physical clairvoyance. Gives instruction in āsana, prāṇāyāma, and dhāraṇā, and advises the application of tests to the physical body, in order that the student may thoroughly understand his own limitations.
X	10	A	Liber Porta Lucis — This book is an account of the sending forth of the Master Therion by the A∴A∴ and an explanation of His mission.' and 'Porta Lucis, the Gate of Light, is one of the titles of Malkuth, whose number is X.
XI	11	D	Liber Nu — Instructions for attaining Nuit.
XIII	13	D	Graduum Montis Abiegni — 'A Syllabus of the Steps upon the Path.' being, 'An account of the task of the Aspirant from Probationer to Adept.
XV	15		Ecclesiæ Gnosticæ Catholicae Canon Missae. The Canon of the Mass according to the Gnostic Catholic Church – The central ceremony of the public and private celebration of the O.T.O., corresponding to the Mass of the Roman Catholic Church. It represents the original and true pre-Christian Christianity.
XVI	16	D	Liber Turris vel Domus Dei — ...called 'The Tower; or the House of God.' An instruction for attainment by the direct destruction of thoughts as they arise in the mind.
XVII	17	D	Liber I.A.O. — Gives three methods of attainment through a willed series of thoughts. This book has not been published. It is the active form of Liber H.H.H. vel CCCXLI. The article Energized Enthusiasm is an adumbration of this book.
XXI	21	B	Khing Kang King (Qingjing Jing), The Classic of Purity — by Ko Yuen. A new translation from the Chinese by the Master Therion.' 'This is the most exalted and yet practical of the Chinese classics.
XXIV	24		De Nuptiis Secretis Deorum Cum Hominibus, Of the Secret Marriages of Gods with Men. A secret instruction of the VIII°.
XXV	25	D	The Ritual of the Star Ruby — An improved form of the 'lesser' ritual of the Pentagram.
XXVII	27	A	Liber Trigrammaton, being a book of Trigrams of the Mutations of the TAO with the YIN and YANG. — An account of the cosmic process: corresponding to the Stanzas of Dzyan in another system.
XXVIII	28		Liber TzBA vel Νικη sub figura XXVIII. The Fountain of Hyacinth — In three parts.
XXVIII	28	D	Liber Septem Regum Sanctorum. Ritual XXVIII. The Ceremony of The Seven Holy Kings. — A ritual of Initiation bestowed on certain selected Probationers. Unpublished.
XXX	30	B	Liber Librae, The Book of Balance. — An elementary course of morality suitable for the average man.
XXXI	31	A	AL (Liber Legis) The Book of the Law sub figurâ XXXI — The Holograph Manuscript of Liber AL vel Legis. Also: Liber L (Liber Legis), or The Book of the Law. Facsimile pages of the actual manuscript of The Book of the Law. This book is the foundation of the New Aeon, and thus of the whole of our Work. Received April 8, 9 and 10, 1904 by Aleister Crowley and Rose Kelly.
XXXIII	33	C	An Account of A∴A∴ first written in the language of his period by the Councillor Von Eckartshausen, and now revised and rewritten in the Universal Cipher. — An elementary suggestive account of the work of the Order in its relation to the average man. The preliminary paper of M∴M∴M∴ (Liber LII in the O.T.O.) may be classed with this.
XXXVI	36	D	The Star Sapphire — An improved ritual of the Hexagram.
XLI	41	C	Thien Tao, A Political Essay or the Synagogue of Satan — An advanced study of Attainment by the method of equilibrium on the ethicals plane.
XLIV	44	D	The Mass of the Phoenix — An instruction in a simple and exoteric form of Eucharist." "A Ritual of the Law.
XLVI	46		The Key of the Mysteries. — A translation by Frater O.M. of the masterpiece of Éliphas Lévi, La Clef des grands mystères.
XLIX	49		Shih I Ch'ien (Shi Yi Qian) — An account of the divine perfection illustrated by the sevenfold permutation of the Dyad. It is presumed that no full copy survives.
LI	51		The Lost Continent — An account of the continent of Atlantis: the manners and customs, magical rites and opinions of its people, together with a true account of the catastrophe, so-called, which ended in its disappearance." "I sometimes feel that this lacks artistic unity. At times it is a fantastic rhapsody describing my ideals of Utopian society; but some passages are a satire on the conditions of our existing civilisation, while others convey hints of certain profound magical secrets, or anticipations of discoveries in science.
LII	52		Manifesto of the O.T.O. — An elementary suggestive account of the work of the Order. The preliminary paper of the A∴A∴ (Liber XXXIII) may be classed with this.
LV	55	C	The Chymical Jousting of Brother Perardua with the seven Lances that he brake. — An account of the Magical and Mystic Path in the language of Alchemy.
LVIII	58	B	An Article on the Qabalah — This is an article on the Qabalah in The Temple of Solomon the King.
LIX	59	C	Across the Gulf — A fantastic account of a previous incarnation. Its principal interest is that its story of the overthrowing of Isis by Osiris may help the reader to understand the meaning of the overthrowing of Osiris by Horus in the present Æon.
LXI	61	D	Liber Causæ. The Preliminary Lection, including the History Lection. — Explains the actual history of the origin of the present movement. Its statements are accurate in the ordinary sense of the word. The object of the book is to discount Mythopœia. A manuscript giving an account of the history of the A∴A∴ in recent times. This history contains no mythology; it is a statement of facts susceptible of rational proof.
LXIV	64	B	Liber Israfel — formally called Anubis. An instruction in a suitable method of preaching.
LXV	65	A	Liber Cordis Cincti Serpente, also known as The Heart Girt with a Serpent. — An account of the relations of the Aspirant with his Holy Guardian Angel. Attainment of the Knowledge and Conversation of the Holy Guardian Angel is the Crown of the Outer College. Similarly 'Liber VII is given to Neophytes, as the grade of Master of the Temple is the next highest resting-place, and Liber CCXX to the Zelator, since that carries him to the highest of all possible grades. Liber XXVII is given to the Practicus, as in this book is the ultimate foundation of the highest theoretical Qabalah, and Liber DCCCXIII to the Philosophus, as it is the foundation of the highest practical Qabalah. This magical treatise describes particularly the relation of the Aspirant with his Higher Self. It is, alike in conception and execution, a masterpiece of exaltation of thought, carved in Pure Beauty.
LXVI	66	A	Liber Stellæ Rubeæ, also known as The Book of the Ruby Star. — A secret ritual, the Heart of IAO-OAI, delivered unto V.V.V.V.V. for his use in a certain matter of Liber Legis, and written down under the figure LXVI. This book is sufficiently described by its title.
LXVII	67	C	The Sword of Song. Called by Christians The Book of the Beast. Dedicated to Bhikkhu Ananda Metteya (Allan Bennett) — A critical study of various philosophies. An account of Buddhism.
LXX	70	D	Σταυρος Βατραχου — The Ceremonies proper to the obtaining of a familiar spirit of a Mercurial nature as described in the Apocalypse of St. John the Divine from a frog or toad. A ritual proper to the VI° of O.T.O.
LXXI	71	B	The Voice of the Silence, the Two Paths, the Seven Portals, by Helena Blavatsky, with an elaborate commentary by Frater O.M.
LXXIII	73		The Urn — This is the sequel to The Temple of Solomon the King, and is the Diary of a Magus. This book contains a detailed account of all the experiences passed through by The Master Therion in His attainment of this grade of Initiation, the highest possible to any manifested Man.
LXXIV	74	D	Liber Testis Testitudinis vel Ayin Daleth Sub Figura LXXIV — Previously unclassified.
LXXVII	77		"Liber OZ, the Book of the Goat" — The O.T.O. manifesto of the rights of mankind: moral, bodily, mental, sexual freedom, and the safeguard tyrannicide. The O.T.O. plan in words of one syllable."
LXXVIII	78	B	A description of the Cards of the Tarot The Book of Thoth — ... with their attributions; including a method of divination by their use." "A complete treatise on the Tarot giving the correct designs of the cards with their attributions and symbolic meanings on all the planes.
LXXXI	81		Moonchild. The Butterfly Net, also known as The Net. — An account of a magical operation, particularly concerning the planet Luna, written in the form of a novel.
LXXXIV	84	B	Liber אנוך vel Chanokh sub figura LXXXIV — A brief abstract of the Symbolic representation of the Universe derived by Dr. John Dee through the Scrying of Sir Edward Kelly." Part I: The Symbolic Representation of The Universe. Part II: The Forty-Eight Calls or Keys.
XC	90	A	Liber Tzaddi vel Hamus Hermeticus sub figura XC, also known as The Book of the Hermetic Fish-Hook. — An account of Initiation, and an indication as to those who are suitable for the same.
XCIII	93		See XXVIII (28).
XCV	95	C	The Wake World. A Tale for Babes and Sucklings. — A poetical allegory of the relations of the soul and the Holy Guardian Angel.
XCVI	96	B	Liber Gaias sub figura XCVI. A Handbook of Geomancy — Describes a system of geomancy.
XCVII	97		Soror Achitha's Vision — Unpublished; possibly not extant. Soror Achitha is the magical motto of Roddie Minor.
C	100		Liber כף Agape Azoth sal Philosophorum. The Book of the Unveiling of the Sangraal, wherein it is spoken of the Wine of the Sabbath of the Adepts. — A secret instruction of the IX°."
CI	101	B	Ordo Templi Orientis: An Open Letter to Those who may Wish to Join the Order — An epistle of Baphomet to Sir George MacNie Cowie VIII°, enumerating the duties and privileges."
CVI	106	B	Concerning Death — An Epistle of Baphomet to Dame Anna Wright VI°."
CXI	111	B	Liber Aleph. The Book of Wisdom or Folly — An extended and elaborate commentary on The Book of the Law, in the form of a letter from the Master Therion to his magical son. This Book contains some of the deepest secrets of initiation, with a clear solution to many cosmic and ethical problems.
CXVI	116	B	See XCVI (96)
CXX	120	D	Liber Cadaveris. Ritual CXX, of Passing through the Tuat. — A Ritual of Initiation of a Zelator.
CXXIV	124		Of Eden and the Sacred Oak; and of the Greater and Lesser Hospitality of the O.T.O. — An Epistle of Baphomet to His Excellency Sir James Thomas Windram, V.H., V.I., V.I., Initiate of the Sanctuary of the Gnosis, his Viceroy in the Union of South Africa.
CXXXII	132		Αποθεοσις CXXXII — An Epistle of Baphomet to His Excellency Sir Wilfred Talbot Smith, T.H., T.I. and T.I. Initiate of the Sanctuary of the Gnosis, on the mystery of incarnation. Part α: Birth of an Idea. Part β: Dead Reckoning, and the Fort. Part γ: The Captain's Ship's Discipline: Hints on Navigation."
CXLVIII	148	C	The Soldier and the Hunchback — An essay on the method of equilibrium on the intellectual plane.
CL	150	E	De Lege Libellum — A further explanation of The Book of the Law, with special reference to the powers and privileges conferred by its acceptance.
CLVI	156	A	Liber Cheth vel Vallum Abiegni sub figura CLVI — This book is a perfect account of the task of the Exempt Adept, considered under the symbols of a particular plane, not the intellectual.
CLVII	157		The Tao Te Ching (Daode Jing) — A new translation, with commentary, by the Master Therion. This is the most exalted and yet practical of the Chinese classics.
CLXI	161		The Law of Thelema — Thelemic epistle.
CLXV	165	B	A Master of the Temple — Frater Achad's magical diary with comments by Crowley.
CLXXV	175	D	Liber Astarte vel Liber Berylli — On uniting oneself to a deity.
CLXXXV	185	D	Liber Collegii Sancti — Tasks and Oaths of the Grades of A∴A∴
CXCIV	194		An Intimation with Reference to the Constitution of the Order— the structure of O.T.O.
CXCVII	197	C	Sir Palamedes the saracen knight — A poetic account of the Great Work.
CC	200	D	Liber Resh vel Helios — An instruction for the adoration of the Sun four times daily.
CCVI	206	D	Liber RU vel Spiritus — Full instructions in Pranayama.
CCVII	207		A syllabus of the official instructions of the A∴.A∴
CCXVI	216		The Yi King (Yi Jing) — A translation with commentary by Crowley.
CCXX	220	A	Liber AL vel Legis, The Book of the Law
CCXXVIII	228		De Natura Deorum Of the Nature of the Gods. A secret instruction of the VII° of O.T.O.
CCXXXI	231	A	Liber Arcanorum — This is an account of the cosmic process so far as it is indicated by the Tarot trumps.
CCXXLII	242	C	AHA! — An exposition in poetic language of several of the ways of attainment and the results obtained.
CCLXV	265		The Structure of the Mind — A treatise of psychology from the mystic and magical standpoint.
CCC	300	E	Khabs am Pekht — A special instruction for the Promulgation of the Law.
CCCXXXIII	333	C	The Book of Lies — A book of 93 brief chapters on many subjects.
CCCXXXV	335	C	Adonis an Allegory — A short play.
CCCXLI	341		Liber H.H.H. — Three methods of attainment.
CCCXLIII	343		AMRITA
CCCLXV	365		The Preliminary Invocation of the Goetia — Similar to Liber Samekh, but with some differences.
CCCLXVII	367		De Homunculo A secret instruction of the X° of O.T.O.
CCCLXX	370	A	Liber A'ash vel Capricorni Pneumatici — Analyzes the nature of the creative magical force in man (veiled sex magick).
CD	400	A	Liber Tau vel Kabbalae Trium Literarum — A graphic interpretation of the Tarot on the plane of Initiation.
CDXII	412	D	Liber A vel Armorum — An instruction for the preparation of the Elemental Instruments.
CDXIV	414		De Arte Magica — An instruction of the IX° of O.T.O.
CDXV	415	AB	The Paris Working — A record of homosexual magick operations.
CDXVIII	418	AB	The Vision and the Voice — The classic account of Crowley's travels through the Thirty Aethyrs.
CDLI	451	B	Eroto-comatose lucidity — Also known as Liber Siloam. Not yet published. A direct method of inducing trance. In Liber CDXIV (414) Chapter XV.
CDLXXIV	474	B	Liber Os Abysmi vel Daath — A method for entering the Abyss.
D	500	B	Sepher Sephiroth — A dictionary of Hebrew words arranged according to their numerical value.
DXXXVI	536	B	Liber Batrachophrenoboocosmomachia — Instruction in the expansion of the field of the mind.
DLV	555	D	Liber HAD — Instructions for attaining Hadit.
DLXX	570	A	Liber DCCCXIII vel Ararita sub figura DLXX — An account of the hexagram, and the method of reducing it to the unity and beyond. See Liber DCCCXIII.
DCXXXIII	633		De Thaumaturgia — A treatise on magical ethics.
DCLXXI	671	D	Liber DCLXXI vel Pyramidos — A ritual of self initiation based on the neophyte ritual.
DCCXXIX	729	C	The Amalantrah Working — Interviews with a discarnate entity.
DCCLXXVII	777	B	777 vel Prolegomena Symbolica Ad Systemam Sceptico Mysticae — The qabalah and the tree of life, and their correspondences.
DCCC	800	D	Liber Samekh — Ritual for the "Attainment of the Knowledge and Conversation of the Holy Guardian Angel".
DCCC	800	C	The Ship — A Mystery Play.
DCCCVIII	808		Serpentis Nehushtan — No copy exists, Gerald Yorke considers this ms. 'Lost'.
DCCCXI	811	C	Energised Enthusiasm — Treatise on sex magick and the creative impulse.
DCCCXIII	813	A	Liber DCCCXIII vel Ararita sub figura DLXX — An account of the hexagram and the method of reducing it to the unity and beyond. See Liber DLXX.
DCCCXXXI	831	D	Liber Yod — Three methods of reducing the manifold consciousness to the unity.
DCCCXXXVII	837	C	The Law of Liberty — Thelemic epistle.
DCCCLX	860	C	John St. John — Record of Crowley's magical retirement.
DCCCLXVIII	868	B	Liber Viarum Viae — A graphic account of Magical powers classified under Tarot Trumps.
DCCCLXXXVIII	888		The Gospel According to Saint Bernard Shaw — A complete study of the origins of Christianity.
CMXIII	913	B	Liber ThIShARB — Methods for attaining the magical memory
CMXXXIV	934		The Cactus — A record of experiments with the Mescal buttons.
CMLXIII	963	AB	The Treasurehouse of Images — Collection of Litanies appropriate to the Signs of the Zodiac, by J.F.C. Fuller.
MCLI	1151		Being the requirements of Minerval to III° in study and work in O.T.O. in the Order as it has manifested under the Caliph.
MCXXXIX	1139		Title Unknown — Referred to as "The Utterance of the Pythoness" in Liber DCCCLXVIII.
MCCLXIV	1264		The Greek Qabalah — A complete dictionary of all sacred and important words and phrases given in the Books of the Gnosis and other important writings both in the Greek and the Coptic. This work has not survived intact and has been partially reconstructed.
MMCMXI	2911	C	A Note on Genesis, by Allan Bennett, prefatory note by Aleister Crowley — A model of Qabalistic ratiocination.

== See also ==
- Kenneth Grant bibliography
- List of occult writers
- The New Equinox – Ceremonial magic publication (1976–1982)
- The Red Book: Liber Novus – Manuscript by Carl Jung
- Thoth Tarot – Divinatory tarot deck
