= Collected Works of Aleister Crowley =

Series of books by Aleister Crowley

Collected Works 1905–1907
- Author: Aleister Crowley
- Illustrator: –
- Language: English
- Genre: poetry/plays/religion
- Publisher: The S. P. R. T
- Publication date: 1905, 1906, 1907
- Publication place: United Kingdom
- Media type: Hardback
- Followed by: Konx Om Pax

The Collected Works of Aleister Crowley (1905–1907) is a trilogy of books published by Aleister Crowley during his early career as student of magick.

== Volume I (1905) ==
The first volume was published in 1905 but contains his poems and plays between 1898 and 1902 and is what he admits to be his juvenilia. It is noted at the beginning:

The great bulk of MSS. from 1887 to 1897 have been sedulously sought out and destroyed. They were very voluminous.

Contents

Page	Title	Type	Year	Read online
1	Aceldama	poem	1898	–
7	The Tale of Archais	dramatic poem	1898	–
29	Songs of the Spirit	poems	1898	–
57	The Poem	play	1898	–
64	Jephthah	play	1899	–
90	Mysteries	poems	1898	–
129	Jezebel and other Tragic Poems	poems	1899	–
136	An Appeal to the American Republic	poem	1899	–
141	The Fatal Force	play	1899	–
154	The Mother's Tragedy	play	1899	–
166	The Temple of the Holy Ghost	poems	1900	–
214	Carmen Saeculare	poem	1901	–
222	Tanhäuser	play	1902	–
263	A Death in Thessaly	epilogue	–	–
265	Qabalistic Dogma	appendix	–	in

Most of these early works show little in the way of magic but are an introduction to Crowley's knowledge of religion and mythology. It's interesting to see how, after Crowley's first book White Stains was banned and pulped, his consequent works of 1898 were quite mellow, almost gothic and Christian, with the first two hiding behind the pseudonym "A Gentlemen of the University of Cambridge" (no doubt after Percy Shelley's "A Gentlemen of the University of Oxford" for similar reasons). Aceldama, named after the place where Judas hanged himself ("the field of blood") is a philosophical lament that sees sin as the only abyss of life. The Tale of Archais is a dramatic love poem telling the story of Charicles and Archais, a girl condemned to turn into a snake. Charicles prays to his mother Aphrodite to change him into a beautiful girl to lure Zeus' love and make him vow to change into a mortal for him/her, this then so Archais can bite and finally kill Zeus to lift the curse. The allusions to adultery and the Christian God are obvious in this comedy.

After Songs of the Spirit the poems pick up Crowley's love of adulterous sex in the name of sin with the likes of "The Honourable Adulterers", "The Five Kisses" (both in Mysteries) and Jezebel and other Tragic Poems (in fact the word "tragedy" was added to these pieces, along with their own pseudonyms "A.E.C" and "Count Vladimir Svareff", again to protect Crowley's early reputation. He knew in himself they were actually comedies)

The Temple of the Holy Ghost is a fusing of the poems in The Mother's Tragedy and other Poems and The Soul of Osiris: A History and now introduces Golden Dawn allusions, Sanskrit yoga terms, qabbalistic terms and Egyptian mythology. It was this latter book that was reviewed by the British poet and writer G. K. Chesterton quite polemically that led to Crowley's early feud with him.

The last piece, Tannhäuser: A Story of all Time, ends Crowley's amateur stage and tells the legend of the Christian knight Tannhäuser, already expressed by Wagner. Crowley's source for the tale was probably the occult scholar Arthur Edward Waite. Tannhäuser in the play leaves his Christian community and his childhood darling Elizabeth for the mysteries of Egypt and the God beyond time. Oddly, Crowley once stated that this play contained the theory of special relativity only Albert Einstein usurped the phenomenon in 1905 by being more blatant.

== Volume II (1906) ==
The second volume showed Crowley's maturing poetry and plays of 1902–1904, with the second half of this book breaking into many prose works based on his new-found interest in nineteenth-century philosophy and Buddhism; keeping in mind that Crowley claimed to receive The Book of the Law from the intelligence Aiwass about this time. Snowdrops from a Curate's Garden and The Goetia were not included in this volume.

Contents

Page	Title	Type	Year	Read online
1	Oracles	poems	1905	–
58	Alice, an Adultery	dramatic poems	1903	–
86	The Argonauts	play	1904	
121	Ahab and other Poems	poems	1903	–
130	The God-Eater	play	1903	–
140	The Sword of Swong	concept poem	1904	–
212	Ambrosii Magi Hortus Rosarum	satire	1902	–
225	The Three Characteristics	satire	1902	–
233	Berashith	essay	1902	–
244	Science and Buddhism	essay	1902	–
262	The Excluded Middle	essay	1902	–
267	Time	essay	1902	–
283	–	epilogue	–	

The first work to appear in this volume, Oracles: the Autobiography of an Art, is like a little collected works in itself and contained Crowley's backlog of poems from 1889 to 1903, including an unfinished Buddhist classic the Dhammapada, Charles Baudelaire's Les Fleurs du mal (also unfinished) and some from Green Alps, his teenage collection of mountaineering poetry. Alice, an Adultery however is a sign of Crowley's maturing poetical skills (as well as again his love of adultery) and claims in the introduction to have been passed him in MS. form from the dying lover of "Alice" on his journeys in the East. It is written in the form of fifty sonnets numbered from the first day to the fiftieth and laments the poet's desire to make love with a married woman.

The Sword of Song was a major breakthrough for Crowley as it was the first to refer to himself as "The Beast" without any reticence as regards his critics, and the cover daringly had "Aleister Crowley = 666" written in Hebrew. It was basically a work based on Robert Browning's Christmas-Eve and Easter-Day and itself contained two long, likewise-colloquial poems called "Ascension Day" and "Pentacoste", both quite anarchic and unreadable because of the constant use of neologisms, disenjambment and punctuation, the poems really set way by means of hundreds of footnotes for collected prose witticisms in the back (even the line-numbering, going up naturally in five, cheekily missed "665" for "666"). The essays and poems in the back include "William Shakespeare", "Pansil", "After Agnosticism", "Preface to Krafft-Ebing's Psychopathia Sexualis", "Summa Spes" and "The Initiated Interpretation of Ceremonial Magick" (the introduction also to his edition of The Goetia).

The rest of this volume contains prose, almost avant-garde, satire. Of no exception is Ambrossi Magi Hortus Rosarum claiming to be translated from a work by "Christeos Luciftias" and is similar to the fantasy attainments such as The Wake World and The Heart of the Master with the aspirant in alchemical fashion moving through the pictures of the Tarot cards. The Three Characteristics is a tongue-in-cheek take on what is known as a "jataka" story, or incarnation saga of Buddhism, but sounds more like the Book of Job with Ganesh being tempted by Jehiour (really Iehi Aour, Allan Bennett) to inflict various karma on the reincarnating Per R Abu (Perdurabo, Crowley). These two works were originally appendices II and I respectively of The Sword of Song whilst Berashith and Science and Buddhism were its supplements and further philosophical works.

The Excluded Middle, or the Skeptic Refuted and Time are also philosophical satire and previously unpublished. They are both dialogues between "Mysticus" and "Skepticus" ("....Hindu Mystic and a British Skeptic....") and also breaks off into footnote essays actually bigger than the main context.

== Volume III (1907) ==
Contents

The final volume of Aleister Crowley's collected works have a flamboyancy of style which will be seen in the following period of his editorial The Equinox. It collects his writings from 1904 to 1907. The contents appear less than the others only because the final work Orpheus was substantially long, taking up maybe 40% of the book.

Contents

Page	Title	Type	Year	Read online
1	The Star and the Garter	concept poems	1904	–
20	Why Jesus Wept	play	1905	–
51	Rosa Mundi and other Love Songs	poems	1905	–
68	The Sire de Malétroit's Door	play	1906	–
84	Gargoyles	poems	1906	–
109	Rodin in Rime	poems	1907	–
126	Orpheus	concept poems	1905	–
219	–	epilogue of I, II, III	–	–
233	(bibliographical note)	appendix A	–	–
240	(index of first lines)	appendix B	–	–

The Star and the Garter is a work that is similar to Alice, an Adultery, only this time the dilemma of the poet represents Crowley upon his wife discovering a prostitute's garter belt in his room. This marks the last time until his divorce that Crowley romanticised unbridled sex. Rosa Mundi was one of a trilogy of poems written for her (Rose Kelly) published under the pseudonym "H. D. Carr" after Katie Carr, the wife of French artist and sculptor Auguste Rodin (1840–1917) who supplied water-colouring to the editions' sleeves. His works were also honoured by Crowley in the following Rodin in Rime (Rosa Inferni itself appears in Gargoyles, whilst Rosa Coelli was published possibly after this volume in 1907).

The last work to appear was Crowley's Orpheus: a Lyrical Legend and was meant to be his crowning work as a poet. As he points out in the introduction, not only was Crowley unhappy with the final product, its lengthy and uninspired creation from as far back as 1902 (uncommon in Crowley who was turbulent in his creative output) was also badly received from friends. But many would agree the pæan style in which Crowley glorifies these mythological characters was pertinent to his career as a conjuror of gods, and the many complicated rhyme schemes were if anything a signpost of the incantatory style of Crowley that is now stereotyped in witchcraft.

The chapters are

- LIBER PRIMUS VEL CARMINUM (Orpheus' tuning his lyre to antistrophe of various "elemental forces")

TO OSCAR ECKENSTEIN, with whom I have wondered in so many solitudes of nature, and thereby learnt the words and spells that bind her children

- LIBER SECUNDUS VEL AMORIS (Orpheus laments Eurydice's death)

TO MARY BEATON, whom I lament

- LIBER TERTIUS VEL LABORIS (Orpheus travels to Hades)

TO THE MEMORY OF IEHI AOUR, with whom I walked through Hell, and compelled it

- LIBER QUARTUS VEL MORTIS (Orpheus on Mt. Ida with the Mænads)

TO MY WIFE

== Editions ==
- The Collected Works of Aleister Crowley 3 vols. 1905–1907, Foyer, UK: S. P. R. T.
- The Collected Works of Aleister Crowley 1 vol, "traveller's ed.", 1907, Foyer, UK: S. P. R. T
- The Collected Works of Aleister Crowley reprint, 3 vols. 1974, Des Plaines, Illinois: Yogi Publication Society, ISBN 0-911662-51-0, ISBN 0-911662-52-9, ISBN 0-911662-53-7

== See also ==
- Aleister Crowley bibliography
