= The Stratagem and other Stories =

1929 book by Aleister Crowley

- Dust-jacket of The Stratagem and Other Stories
- Author: Aleister Crowley
- Language: English
- Genre: Fantasy
- Publisher: Mandrake Press
- Publication date: 1929
- Publication place: United Kingdom
- Media type: Print (hardback)
- Pages: 140 pp

The Stratagem and other Stories is a small book of short stories written by Aleister Crowley (1875–1947), occultist, ceremonial magician, poet, and prophet of Thelema.

== Contents ==
The book was originally published in 1929 and one of a series of Crowley's works to be published by Mandrake Press after a period in which Crowley found it difficult to publish due both to his lack of funds, and his notoriety. Mandrake Press also published The Confessions of Aleister Crowley volumes I and II, and Moonchild.

Crowley published few collections of short stories, but the title story received such a good review from British novelist Joseph Conrad when he published it in The English Review that he thought it was a possible calling to conventional fame.

The second story, "The Testament of Magdalen Blair," is the longest of the three and was originally published in The Equinox volume I, no.9 in 1913. It tells the haunting story of a psychic woman who delves into the dying, subconscious psyche of her husband and bears resemblance to Edgar Allan Poe's "Mesmeric Revelation" and "The Facts in the Case of M. Valdemar".

The third short story, "His Secret Sin", was first published in The Equinox volume I, no.8 in 1912 and has a perverse absconding with a photograph of the Venus de Milo.

The inscription at the front of the book reads:

To the Memories of Three Dead Friends: Joseph Conrad, who applauded the first story; Allan Bennett, Bhikku Ananda Metteya, who suggested the second, and Eugene John Weiland, who bowled me out over the third.

== Editions ==
- Mandrake Press, UK, 1929
- Temple Press, UK, 1990, ISBN 1-871744-10-5

== See also ==
- Aleister Crowley bibliography
