= Liber OZ =

Aleister Crowley manifesto

"Liber OZ", also known as "Book 77", "The Book of the Goat", and "The Rights of Man" is a single-page declaration authored by the English occultist Aleister Crowley in 1941. This text, initially published as a leaflet or broadside, delineates the fundamental rights of individuals as viewed through the lens of Thelema, the spiritual and social movement which Crowley founded in the early 20th century. Thelema emphasizes the principle of individual will as its core tenet.

Liber OZ is divided into five paragraphs, each addressing different aspects of human rights: moral, bodily, mental, sexual, and the right to safeguard freedoms, including the controversial assertion of the right to commit tyrannicide. Crowley's aim was to encapsulate the principles of Thelema in a manner that was direct and accessible, describing the "O.T.O. plan in words of one syllable." It is one of the last and shortest of the books known as the Libri of Aleister Crowley.

The creation of Liber OZ took place during World War II. The text draws from earlier initiation lectures and teachings within Ordo Templi Orientis (O.T.O.), a fraternal organization focused on the study and practice of Western esotericism and Thelema.

Liber OZ encapsulates Crowley's vision of a society where individuals are free to pursue their True Will without external interference. It remains an essential document within Thelemic practice, continuing to influence contemporary interpretations of Crowley's work and the broader neopagan and New Age movements. This declaration reflects Crowley's commitment to personal and spiritual liberty.

== Historical context ==
Liber OZ was written during World War II. The war influenced Crowley's emphasis on individual rights and freedoms, as he objected to the violations of human liberties under totalitarian regimes, most notably those led by Adolf Hitler.

Hitler's regime was notorious for its severe persecution of various minority groups, including Jews, Romani people, and political dissidents. Particularly relevant to Crowley's work, the Nazi regime also aggressively targeted the LGBT community. Thousands of gay men were arrested, and many were sent to concentration camps, where they faced brutal treatment and death. Crowley, who was openly bisexual, found this persecution particularly abhorrent.

Hitler also banned Thelema in Germany, and Crowley's close student and eventual successor Karl Germer (1885–1962) was arrested by the Gestapo on 13 February 1935 in Leipzig and incarcerated. He was first held at the Columbia-Haus prison in Berlin before being transferred to the Esterwegen concentration camp on the Dutch Frontier where thousands of political dissidents were imprisoned by the Nazis, where he remained for seven months and was subjected to solitary confinement. He would be transferred to several other concentration camps before eventually being released in February 1941.

The impact of World War II on personal freedoms and the oppressive nature of many wartime governments inspired Crowley to create a text that explicitly delineated the rights he believed were fundamental to every individual. During this time, Crowley was actively involved in promoting his philosophical and spiritual ideas, making Liber OZ a critical document in his later work.

Crowley's involvement with Ordo Templi Orientis, a fraternal organization dedicated to the study and practice of esotericism and Thelema, was instrumental in the formulation of Liber OZ. The principles articulated in this text draw heavily from earlier initiation lectures and teachings within O.T.O., reflecting Crowley's long-standing commitment to these ideals.

Crowley wrote the piece for Louis Wilkinson to convey as simply as possible the "O.T.O. plan in words of one syllable" broken down into "five sections: moral, bodily, mental, sexual, and the safeguard tyrannicide...". It was first published "by the O.T.O. at the Abbey of Thelema, Rainbow Valley, Palomar Mountains, California. And at Hanover Square, London, W.1. An Ixv Sol in 0° Capricornus"—Published on the 21st of December, 1941.

== Detailed analysis ==
=== Prelude ===
Liber OZ opens with "There is no god but man", encapsulating the essence of Thelemic philosophy. This declaration comports with Crowley's belief in the supremacy of True Will, challenging traditional religious beliefs. By placing humanity at the center of spiritual experience, Crowley underscores his belief in the importance of self-determination and personal freedom, setting the stage for the rights and freedoms outlined in OZ.

=== Moral rights ===
Liber OZ begins by affirming the right of every individual to live by their own law. This principle is foundational in Thelemic philosophy, emphasizing the importance of personal autonomy and self-determination. Crowley believed that each person must discover and follow their True Will, unimpeded by external constraints. This right to moral autonomy was seen by Crowley to be essential for the realization of one's true potential and spiritual growth.

=== Bodily rights ===
The second section addresses bodily rights, asserting that individuals have the right to live where they will and to move about the earth as they desire. This reflects Thelema's emphasis on physical freedom and the importance of personal sovereignty over one's own body. Crowley viewed these rights as integral to the pursuit of one's True Will, allowing individuals to seek environments and experiences that facilitate their spiritual and personal development.

=== Mental rights ===
Crowley then enumerates mental and expressive rights, including the freedom to think, speak, write, draw, paint, carve, etch, mold, build, and dress as one wills. These rights underscore the significance of intellectual and creative freedom, allowing individuals to express themselves fully and authentically. Crowley believed that unrestricted creative expression was crucial for the exploration and realization of the True Will.

=== Sexual rights ===
The fourth section of Liber OZ deals with sexual rights, proclaiming the individual's right to love when, where, and with whom they will. Crowley's views on sexual freedom were progressive for his time, advocating for the liberation of sexual expression as a vital aspect of personal and spiritual development. As an openly bisexual man, Crowley's emphasis on sexual freedom also countered the oppressive sexual norms and persecutions of his time.

=== Safeguard tyrannicide ===
Finally, Crowley addresses the right to safeguard these freedoms, including the controversial assertion of the right to commit tyrannicide. This section implies that individuals have the right to protect their fundamental liberties, even to the extent of taking extreme measures against those who would thwart these rights. This reflects Crowley's stance on personal autonomy and resistance to oppression, and it underscores the importance he placed on the active defense of one's personal and spiritual freedoms.

== Textual references ==
Liber OZ holds a prominent place within the corpus of Thelemic literature and is referred to across various key texts of Thelema. Its principles resonate with the central themes of personal liberty and self-realization that underpin the philosophy of Thelema.

- The Book of the Law (Liber AL vel Legis): The core scripture of Thelema, received and written down by Aleister Crowley in 1904, sets forth the fundamental maxim: "Do what thou wilt shall be the whole of the Law." This foundational text emphasizes the discovery and fulfillment of one's true will, which aligns with the rights enumerated in Liber OZ. Liber AL advocates for personal freedom and self-determination, principles that are explicitly articulated in OZ.
- The Equinox: OZ is featured and discussed in The Equinox: The Review of Scientific Illuminism, Vol. 3, No. 10, published posthumously in 1990. This periodical serves as the official organ of the A∴A∴ and later of O.T.O. This volume includes essays, rituals, and commentaries that explore the philosophical and practical aspects of Thelema.
- Magick Without Tears: In a collection of Crowley's letters written to his students, Crowley expands on the principles of Thelema in a more accessible and explanatory format. He addresses questions about the nature of will, freedom, and the application of Thelemic laws in everyday life. The rights outlined in OZ are echoed throughout these letters, as Crowley explains the importance of personal liberty and the necessity of safeguarding these freedoms against external oppression.
- The Law is for All: This volume contains Crowley's comprehensive commentary on The Book of the Law. In this text, Crowley elucidates the deeper meanings of the verses and their practical implications. The rights proclaimed in OZ are contextualized within the broader framework of Thelemic doctrine, highlighting the integral role these freedoms play in the pursuit of one's true will.

These references in core Thelemic texts underscore the significance of Liber OZ within the Thelemic tradition.

== Reception and influence ==
Liber OZ has been influential within the Thelemic community and continues to have impact on modern interpretations of Thelema. It has been widely disseminated and is often displayed in Thelemic temples and spaces as a declaration of the freedoms that Thelema espouses.

Scholars have explored the philosophical underpinnings of Liber OZ, its historical context, and its implications for contemporary issues of freedom and human rights. Crowley's forward-thinking views on autonomy and expression along with his radical stance on the use of force to protect individual rights are both subjects of review.

The text's assertion of personal freedoms attracted attention from broader esoteric and countercultural movements.

== See also ==
- Aleister Crowley bibliography
- List of Thelemites
