= Moonchild (novel) =

1917 novel by Aleister Crowley

- Cover of the Weiser edition
- Author: Aleister Crowley
- Cover artist: Beresford Egan
- Language: English
- Genre: Occult
- Publisher: Mandrake Press (1929); Samuel Weiser, Inc. (1970) Walden Editora, Argentna (2025)
- Publication date: 1929
- Publication place: United Kingdom
- Media type: Print (Hardback & Paperback)
- Pages: 335 pp
- ISBN: 0-87728-147-5
- OCLC: 656135722
- Dewey Decimal: 823.912
- LC Class: PR6005 .R7

Moonchild (a.k.a., Liber LXXXI [Book 81], or The Butterfly Net) is a novel written by the English occultist Aleister Crowley in 1917. Its plot involves a magical war between a group of white magicians, led by Simon Iff, and a group of black magicians, over an unborn child. It was first published by Mandrake Press in 1929 and its recent edition is published by Weiser. It has been translated to Spanish and published in Argentina by Walden Editora under the title "Hija de la Luna".

Albeit not strictly a roman à clef, the novel depicts numerous acquaintances of Crowley's, thinly disguised as fictional characters. Grady McMurtry's "Note on Moonchild" provides some insight into the possible real characters on which the author based the characters in the novel. Crowley portrays MacGregor Mathers as the primary villain, including him as a character named SRMD, using the abbreviation of Mathers's magickal name. Arthur Edward Waite appears as a villain named Arthwaite, and the unseen head of the Inner Circle of which SRMD was a member. "A.B." is theosophist Annie Besant. Among Crowley's friends and allies, Allan Bennett appears as Mahatera Phang, Leila Waddell as Sister Cybele, the dancer Isadora Duncan appears as Lavinia King, and her companion Mary D'Este (mother of Preston Sturges, who helped Crowley write his magnum opus Magick: Book 4 under her magical name 'Soror Virakam') appears as Lisa la Giuffria. Cyril Grey is Crowley himself, while Simon Iff, who advocates the Way of the Tao, probably is the German occultist and head of Ordo Templi Orientis Theodor Reuss, whom Crowley considered a mentor.

== Plot summary ==
A year or so before the beginning of World War I, a young woman named Lisa la Giuffria is seduced by a white magician, Cyril Grey, and persuaded into helping him in a magickal battle with a black magician and his Black Lodge. Grey is attempting to save and improve the human race and condition by creating a homunculus, through impregnating the girl with the soul of an ethereal being—the Moonchild. To achieve this, she will have to be kept in a secluded environment, and many preparatory magickal rituals will be carried out. The black magician Douglas is bent on destroying Grey's plan. However, Grey's ultimate motives may not be what they appear. The Moonchild rituals are carried out in Southern Italy, but the occult organizations are based in Paris and England. At the end of the book, the war breaks out, and the white magicians support the Allies, while the black magicians support the Central Powers.

== Critical reception ==
On 28 October 1929, the Aberdeen Press & Journal commented on Moonchild:

"We are constantly reminded of the moods of Anatole France and the methods of Rabelais. From extensive dissertations on magic and spiritualism we are suddenly switched into humour that is sometimes normal, sometimes sardonic. From a glimpse into the blackest mysteries of Hecate we are transferred to a wonderful white vision of the poets. From the trivialities of peace we emerge into the horrors of the Great War. Moonchild is not more fantastic than a thorough going "thriller", but it is also a satire and an allegory, full of disorder and genius."

== Influence ==
Although Crowley was a prolific writer of treatises on Western esotericism and occultism, he penned only a few novels. Moonchild, his second published novel after The Diary of a Drug Fiend (1922), is his most famous. Over the years, Moonchild has exerted significant influence on popular culture, particularly on rock music. Rory Gallagher's song "Moonchild", from his 1976 album Calling Card, and John Zorn's 2006 album Moonchild: Songs Without Words both pay tribute to Crowley's novel. Iron Maiden's song of the same name, from their 1988 album Seventh Son of a Seventh Son, not only references the novel's themes, but the line "hear the mandrake scream" is also a nod to Mandrake Press, the book's original publisher. The 1988 album The Nephilim, by English goth rock band Fields of the Nephilim, makes several references to Crowley's work, while the top-charting single "Moonchild" directly references the novel. A song by King Crimson, from their 1969 debut album In the Court of the Crimson King also has the same title, but the band's co-founder and lyricist Peter Sinfield has stated that it was not a conscious reference to Crowley's work.

The supernatural horror film To the Devil a Daughter (1976), loosely based on the novel by Dennis Wheatley, has been described as having a "striking resemblance" to this novel. The fantasy film Moon Child (1989), by Spanish filmmaker Agustí Villaronga, was inspired by Crowley's work. The unreleased soundtrack for the film was recorded by Australian goth pioneers Dead Can Dance. In Mark Frost's epistolary novel The Secret History of Twin Peaks, there is a chapter on Crowley which suggests that Moonchild was a source of inspiration for his and David Lynch's cult TV series Twin Peaks, particularly with its two warring lodges (a Black and a White Lodge), and several minor characters.

== Related writings ==
Prior to writing this novel, during a visit to New Orleans in December 1916, Crowley wrote a number of short stories where his character, Simon Iff, investigates various crimes and mysteries.

== Babalon Working ==
A project called Babalon Working was undertaken by Jack Parsons and L. Ron Hubbard in 1946, inspired by Moonchild. Babalon Working was supposed to manifest an incarnation of Babalon, who would then carry a "magickal child" or "moonchild".

== See also ==
- Aleister Crowley bibliography
