= JSM =

JSM may refer to:

== Media and publications ==
- Joseph Smith—Matthew, a book of the Pearl of Great Price of the Latter Day Saint movement
- Journal for the Academic Study of Magic
- Journal of Sexual Medicine, a peer-reviewed academic journal
- Just Shoot Me!, an American television sitcom

== People ==
- John Stuart Mill (1806–1873), British philosopher, political economist, and politician
- Josie Maran (Johanna Selhorst "Josie" Maran), American supermodel and actress
- Julius Sumner Miller, American physicist and science educator

== Sports ==
- JSM Béjaïa, a football club in Béjaïa, Algeria
- JSM Chéraga, a football club in Chéraga, Algeria
- JSM Tiaret, a football club in Tiaret, Algeria
- Al Shabiba Mazraa Beirut, also known as JS Mazraa, a football club in Mazraa, Lebanon

== Other ==
- The Japanese School of Melbourne
- Joint Statistical Meetings, a conference of statisticians in North America
- Joint Strike Missile, an improved version of the Norwegian anti-ship Naval Strike Missile
- Johnson Stokes & Master, one of the oldest law firms in Asia
- John Smith Monument, built to commemorate John Smith's visit to New Hampshire
- Juris Scientiae Magister (Master of the Science of Laws), a postgraduate law degree awarded by Stanford University and other institutions
