= The Holy Books of Thelema =

Collection of works by Aleister Crowley

The Holy Books of Thelema is a collection of 15 works by Aleister Crowley, the founder of Thelema, originally published in 1909 by Crowley under the title Θελημα, and later republished in 1983, together with a number of additional texts, under the new title, The Holy Books of Thelema, by Ordo Templi Orientis under the direction of Hymenaeus Alpha.

== Content ==
The Holy Books of Thelema consists of the wholly class A libri of Aleister Crowley, which indicates that they that are not to be changed, even to the letter. According to Crowley, they were not so much written by him as through him, and are therefore referred to as inspired works. Additionally, Liber LXI, a class D text, is included as an introduction after a preface by Hymenaeus Alpha and synopsis compiled from Crowley's writings. Liber LXI was originally class A, then changed to class B, indicating works of scholarship, then changed to class D, indicating official rituals and instructions. Liber I was originally a Class B document but was reclassified as class A in 1913, and so it is included in The Holy Books of Thelema. The majority of these texts were written between the years 1907 and 1911. They are listed in numerical order, following their designation in Roman numerals, with the exception of Liber XXXI which immediately follows Liber CCXX.

Liber AL vel Legis, also known as The Book of the Law, is the foundational text for Thelema. It is included as both Liber CCXX and Liber XXXI. The latter is the handwritten original, while Liber CCXX was transcribed from the original and was given the number 220 because it is composed of 220 verses. It is the only Holy Book that Aleister Crowley denied authoring in the usual sense of the word. (Note: Crowley (1991), p. 106: Note, moreover, with what greedy vanity I claim authorship even of all the other A∴A∴ Books in Class A, though I wrote them inspired beyond all I know to be I. Yet in these Books did Aleister Crowley, the master of English both in prose and in verse, partake insofar as he was That. Compare those Books with The Book of the Law! The style [of the former] is simple and sublime; the imagery is gorgeous and faultless; the rhythm is subtle and intoxicating; the theme is interpreted in faultless symphony. There are no errors of grammar, no infelicities of phrase. Each Book is perfect in its kind. I, daring to snatch credit for these [...] dared nowise to lay claim to have touched The Book of the Law, not with my littlest finger-tip.)

Grady McMurtry, writing as Hymenaeus Alpha, provided an overview of the contents of the original and expanded editions in the preface to the 1983 edition, and they have also been discussed by Colin Campbell, who has also produced a concordance.

=== Original contents of Θελημα ===
- Volume I
  - Liber LXI vel Causæ
    Briefly explains the history and origin of Thelema and the A∴A∴. This text, being in Class D, is not technically a "holy book", but was included in Θελημα as an introduction, and is thus listed here.
  - Liber LXV Cordis Cincti Serpente sub figurâ אדני
    An account of the relations of the aspirant and his Holy Guardian Angel.
- Volume II
  - Liber Liberi vel Lapidis Lazuli, Adumbratio Kabbalae Aegyptiorum sub figurâ VII
    These are the birth words of a Master of the Temple. Its 7 chapters are referred to the 7 planets in the following order: Mars, Saturn, Jupiter, Sol, Mercury, Luna, Venus.
- Volume III
  - Liber Trigrammaton sub figurâ XXVII
    A book of trigrams of the mutations of the tao with the yin and yang. An account of the cosmic process.
  - Liber AL vel Legis sub figurâ CCXX, commonly called the Book of the Law
    Among the Holy Books of Thelema, the chief is the Book of the Law. Every Thelemite is expected to interpret the book "each for himself".
  - Liber DCCCXIII vel Ararita sub figurâ DLXX
    An account of the hexagram and the method of reducing it to the unity and beyond. This book describes in magical language a very secret process of initiation.

=== Additional texts included in The Holy Books of Thelema ===
- Liber B vel Magi sub figurâ I
  An account of the Grade of Magus, the highest grade which it is even possible to manifest in any way whatsoever upon this plane.
- Liber Porta Lucis sub figurâ X
  An account of the sending forth of the Master Therion by the A∴A∴ and an explanation of his mission.
- Liber AL (Liber Legis) sub figurâ XXXI, commonly called the Book of the Law
  A facsimile of the handwritten manuscript of the Book of the Law; includes the Comment.
- Liber Stellæ Rubeæ sub figurâ LXVI
  Sexual magick veiled in symbolism.
- Liber Tzaddi (צ) vel Hamus Hermeticus sub figurâ XC
  An account of Initiation, and an indication as to those who are suitable for the same.
- Liber Cheth (ח) vel Vallum Abiegni sub figurâ CLVI
  Sexual magick veiled in symbolism.
- Liber Arcanorum τών Atu τού Tahuti Quas Vidit Asar In Amennti sub figurâ CCXXXI Liber Carcerorum τών Qliphoth cum suis Geniis
  An account of the cosmic process so far as it is indicated by the Tarot Trumps. The sequence of the 22 Trumps is explained as a formula of Initiation.
- Liber A’ash (עש) vel Capricorni Pneumatici sub figurâ CCCLXX
  Analyzes the nature of the creative magical force in man, explains how to awaken it, how to use it and indicates the general as well as the particular objects to be gained thereby. Sexual magick veiled in symbolism.
- Liber Tau (ת) vel Kabbalæ Trium Literarum
  A graphic interpretation of the Tarot on the plane of Initiation.

== Other holy books ==
Three libri containing class A material (but which are not wholly class A) are excluded from the collection, namely: Liber CDXV — Opus Lutetianum (commonly called the Paris Working); Liber XXX Ærum vel Sæculi sub figurâ CDXVIII (commonly called The Vision and the Voice); and Liber Θεσαυρου Ἐιδολον sub figurâ DCCCCLXIII (commonly called the Treasurehouse of Images).

=== Stele of Revealing ===
Despite its significance to Thelema, the Stele of Revealing is not listed as one of The Holy Books of Thelema; however, its English translation is included in Appendix A alongside supplementary materials. Crowley purports to have authored the text in a past incarnation as the ancient Egyptian priest Ankh-ef-en-Khonsu i.

== See also ==
- Great Work
