= The Law is for All =

Book by Aleister Crowley

- Cover of the 1996 edition
- Author: Aleister Crowley
- Language: English
- Subject: Thelema
- Published: 1975
- Publisher: Llewellyn Publications
- Publication place: United States
- ISBN: 978-0-87542-114-8

The Law is for All is a collection of Aleister Crowley's commentary on The Book of the Law, the central sacred text of Thelema. It was edited to be a primer of sorts into Crowley's general interpretations about the sometimes opaque text of Liber Legis. For this reason, the book omits many of the more complex qabalistic explanations that lean heavily on an understanding of gematria and The Tree of Life. As the original editor, Louis Wilkinson, wrote in his introduction:

The aim of the Commentary on the Book of the Law is to guide the reader along the path of the discovery of his own true will, in accordance with which, and only in accordance with which, he can rightly think and act. This is why "Do what thou wilt shall be the whole of the Law." Only by doing so will you be shown your own true thought and life.

Crowley's long expository was written prior to the final Comment that now is appended to The Book of the Law.

== Provenance ==
Most of Crowley's commentaries were written between 1919 and 1922. He wrote about his reception of Liber AL vel Legis and the composing of the commentaries in Chapter 66 of his Confessions, further elaborating on the symbolic and practical aspects of the different commentaries and their significance in the broader context of his work in the following two chapters. Prior to publication, the commentaries were privately distributed, and Crowley wrote several letters to students which refer to the commentaries. These letters were posthumously published in the collection Magick Without Tears by Karl Germer in 1954.

Crowley turned to publishing the commentaries late in his life. They were edited by Louis Wilkinson, a trusted friend, at Crowley's request. A first draft was completed in 1946, and it is believed that Crowley reviewed it, since a copy was found among his final possessions; however, his death in 1947 put a hold on its publication. The original manuscript was eventually published under the name Magical and Philosophical Commentaries on the Book of the Law, edited by John Symonds and Kenneth Grant. The next year, Israel Regardie published a competing edition based on a 1926 manuscript. Both editions were cumbersome and neglected to address numerous inconsistencies within the complex collection of notes. The 1996 edition of The Law is for All was edited by Hymenaeus Beta based upon the final Wilkinson manuscript.

== Editions ==
- Grant, Kenneth; Symonds, John, eds. (1974). Magical and Philosophical Commentaries on The Book of the Law. Canada: 93 Publishing. ISBN 978-0-919690-01-1.
- Regardie, Israel, ed. (1975). The Law is for All: An Extended Commentary on The Book of the Law. Llewellyn Publications. ISBN 978-0-87542-114-8.
- Regardie, Israel, ed. (1985). The Law is for All: An Extended Commentary on The Book of the Law. Falcon Press. ISBN 0-941404-25-0.
- Regardie, Israel, ed. (1991). The Law is for All: An Extended Commentary on The Book of the Law. Phoenix: New Falcon Press. ISBN 978-1-56184-005-2.
- Wilkinson, Louis U.; Beta, Hymenaeus, eds. (1996). The Law Is for All: The Authorized Popular Commentary to The Book of the Law. Thelema Media. ISBN 978-0-9726583-8-6.

== See also ==
- Aleister Crowley bibliography
