= Richard Barham Middleton =

English poet and story writer (1882–1911)

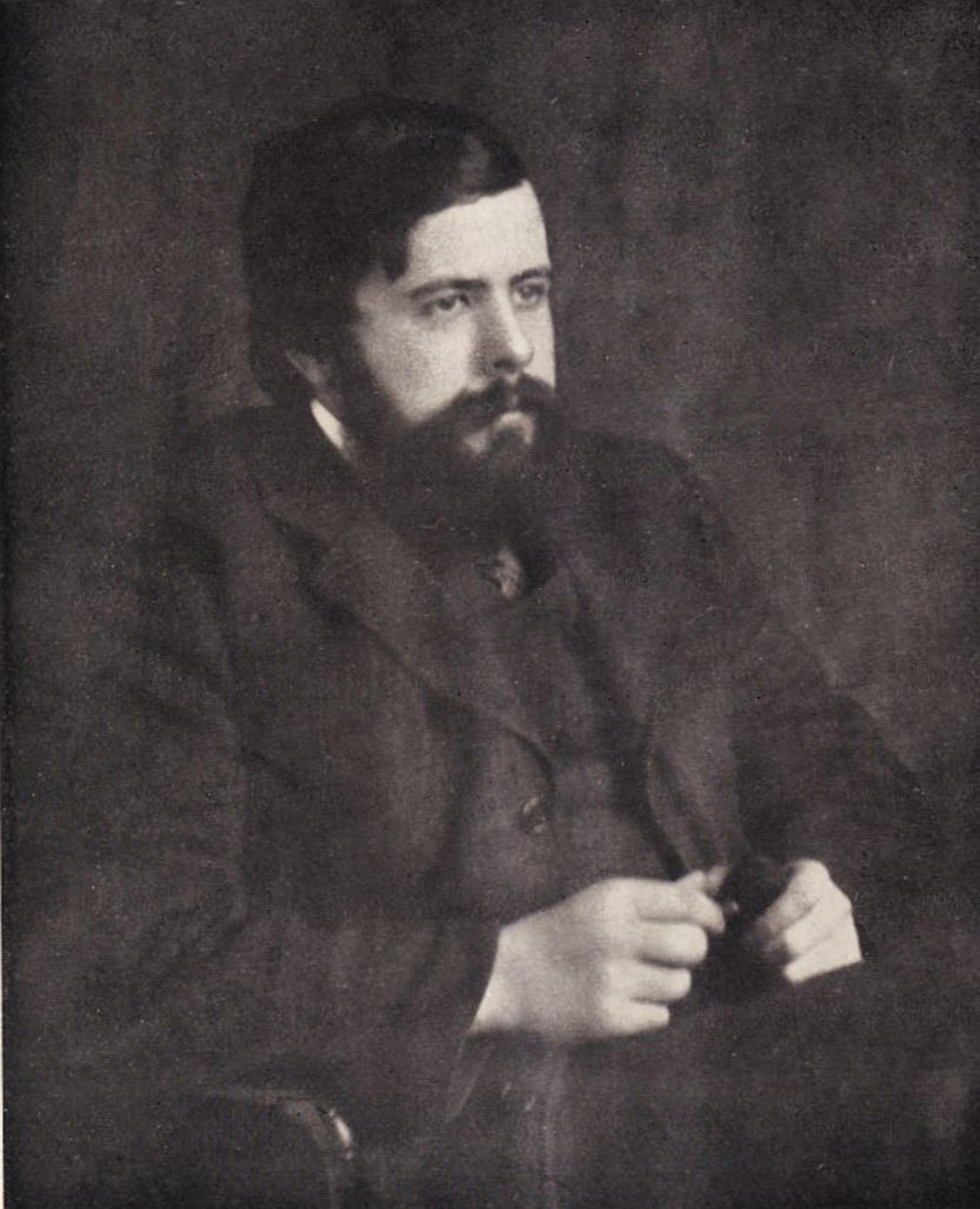
Richard Barham Middleton c. 1909

Richard Barham Middleton (28 October 1882 – 1 December 1911) was an English poet and author. He is remembered most for his short ghost stories, in particular "The Ghost Ship".

== Biography ==
Born in Staines, Middlesex, Middleton was educated at Cranbrook School, Kent. He then worked as a clerk at the Royal Exchange Assurance Corporation bank in London from 1901 to 1907. Unhappy with that, he affected a Bohemian life at night – he is mentioned, in disguised terms, in Arthur Ransome's Bohemia in London. He moved out of his parents' house into rooms in Blackfriars and joined the New Bohemians, a club where he acquired literary contacts, including Arthur Machen, Louis McQuilland (1880–1946) and Christopher Wilson.

Middleton became an editor at Vanity Fair under Edgar Jepson, where he confided to his fellow editor Frank Harris that he really wanted to make a living as a poet. Shortly afterwards, Harris published Middleton's poem "The Bathing Boy":

I saw him standing idly on the brim
Of the quick river, in his beauty clad,
So fair he was that Nature looked at him
And touched him with her sunbeams here and there
So that his cool flesh sparkled, and his hair
Blazed like a crown above the naked lad.

And so I wept; I have seen lovely things,
Maidens and stars and roses all a-nod
In moonlit seas, but Love without his wings
Set in the azure of an August sky,
Was all too fair for my mortality,
And so I wept to see the little god.

Till with a sudden grace of silver skin
And golden lock he dived, his song of joy
Broke with the bubbles as he bore them in;
And lo, the fear of night was on that place,
Till decked with new-found gems and flushed of face
He rose again, a laughing, choking boy.

His work was also published by Austin Harrison in The English Review, and he wrote book reviews for The Academy.

Middleton suffered from severe depression, then termed melancholia. He spent his last nine months in Brussels, where in December 1911, at age 29, he took his life by poisoning himself with chloroform, which had been prescribed as a remedy for his condition. His literary reputation was sustained by Edgar Jepson and Arthur Machen, the latter in an introduction to Middleton's collection The Ghost Ship and Other Stories, and later by John Gawsworth. His stories appeared in several anthologies.

An encounter with Middleton is said to have persuaded the young Raymond Chandler to postpone his career as a writer. Chandler wrote, "Middleton struck me as having far more talent than I was ever likely to possess; and if he couldn't make a go of it, it wasn't very likely that I could."

== Works ==
- Poems and Songs (1912)
- Poems and Songs Second Series (1912)
- The Day Before Yesterday (essays, 1912)
- The Ghost Ship and Other Stories (1912)
- Monologues (1913)
- Queen Melanie and the Woodboy (novel, 1931)
- The Pantomime Man (stories, 1933)
- Richard Middleton (poems, 1937), Richards Press

== Sources ==
- Richard Middleton's Letters to Henry Savage (1929, Mandrake Press) edited by Henry Savage
- Henry Savage; Richard Middleton: The Man And His Work (1922, London: Cecil Palmer)
