= Rites of Eleusis =

Public invocations by Aleister Crowley

Leila Waddell (Laylah), assistant and muse to Aleister Crowley in writing and performing the Rites

The Rites of Eleusis were a series of seven public invocations or rites written by British occultist Aleister Crowley, each centered on one of the seven classical planets of antiquity. They were dramatically performed by Aleister Crowley, Leila Waddell (Laylah), and Victor Benjamin Neuburg in October and November 1910, at Caxton Hall, London. This act brought Crowley's occult organization the A∴A∴ into the public eye.

== The Rites ==
The names of the seven Rites are The Rite of "Saturn", "Jupiter", "Mars", "Sol", "Venus", "Mercury" and "Luna". Crowley claimed that the Rites were designed to inspire the audience with 'religious ecstasy', and that merely reading them would help people "cultivate their highest faculties". Some in the popular press thought otherwise, and considered the Rites an immoral display, riddled with 'blasphemy and erotic suggestion.' The Rite of Luna was danced by Joan Hayes also known as Ione de Forest, a lover of Victor Neuberg

== In print ==
The rites were documented by Rites of Eleusis: As Performed at Caxton Hall, illustrated by Dwina Murphy-Gibb and edited by Keith Richmond and published by Mandrake Press in 1990 in a limited edition of 1,000 copies. This contained the scripts of the rites, with introduction by Richmond and explanatory essays by Richmond and Terence DuQuesne. The edition included a series of adorations, The Treasure House of Images by Capt J.F.C. Fuller, and Crowley's Magick Book 4 (Liber O).

== Later performances ==
[Ordo Templi Orientis]] groups regularly perform Crowley's Rites. An additional "Rite of Earth" was authored by Lon Milo Duquette and others as a logical extension of the Rites to complete the sequence from Saturn (Binah) to Earth (Malkuth).

Beginning in 2000, Seattle-based Eleusyve Productions has been composing original musical arrangements for each of theRites. All seven have been created and staged, with the final video, "Rite of Saturn", released in May 2020.

On March 7, 2008 experimental media artist Raymond Salvatore Harmon presented a three channel video performance of the Rites of Eleusis at Horse Hospital Gallery, London, UK, by recontextualizing them into seven abstract films containing all of the original content as subliminal content hidden within each film.

== Sources ==
- Crowley, Aleister - Rites of Eleusis: As Performed at Caxton Hall (ISBN 1-872736-02-5)
- King, Francis - The Rise of Western Occultism
