= Konx Om Pax =

1907 publication by Aleister Crowley

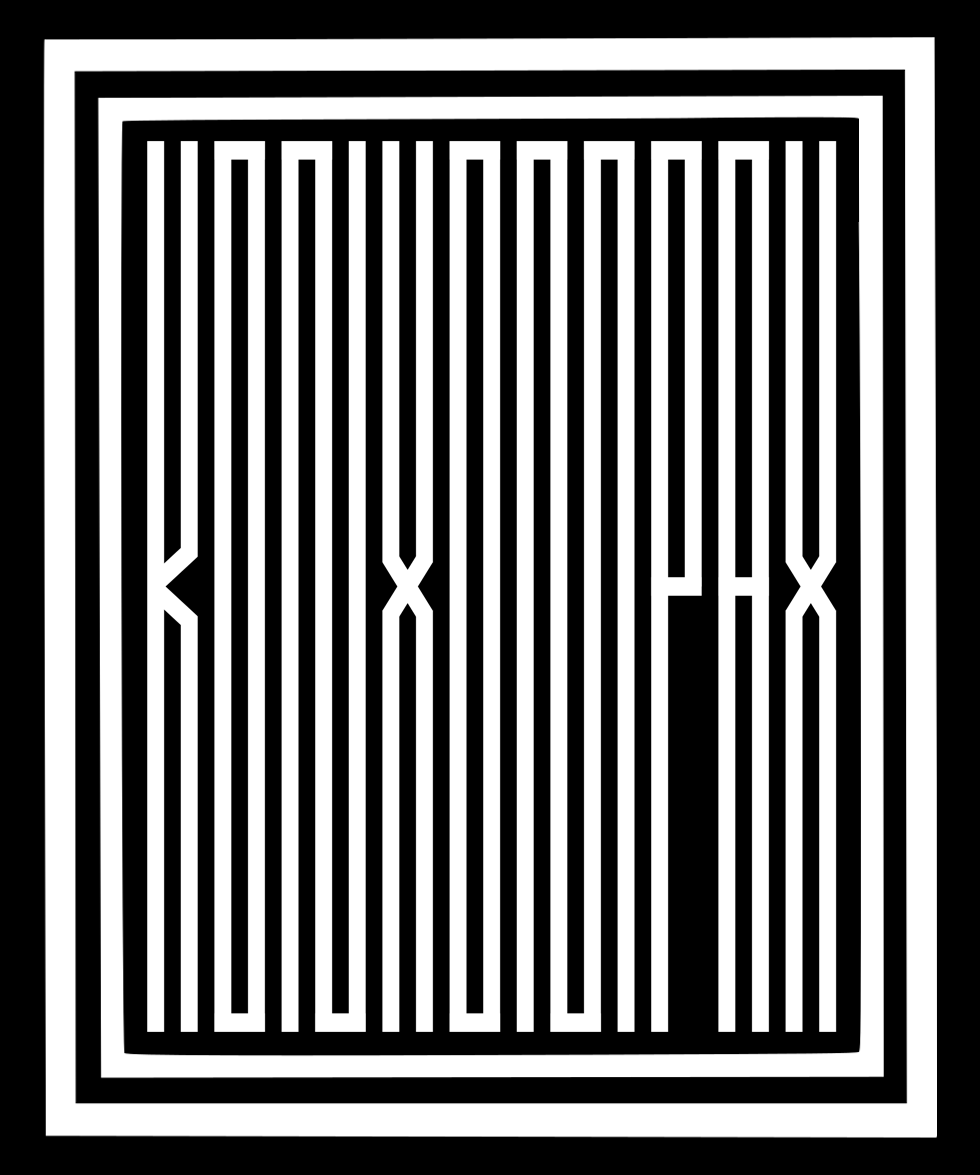
- Cover of Konx Om Pax by Aleister Crowley
- Author: Aleister Crowley
- Language: English
- Publisher: Walter Scott Publishing Company
- Publication date: 1907
- Publication place: United Kingdom

Konx Om Pax: Essays in Light is a publication by British occultist Aleister Crowley, first published in 1907.

The title, Konx Om Pax, is a phrase said to have been pronounced in the Eleusinian Mysteries to bid initiates to depart after having completed the tests for admission to the degree of epopt (seer). The origin and meaning of this phrase are obscure, although numerous theories have been proposed. Feidias Mpourlas claimed that the phrase is derived from a misunderstanding of onomatopoeic words in the entry "κογξ ομοίως παξ" of Hesychius' dictionary, where "ομοίως" might have been abbreviated to "ομ.". S. L. MacGregor Mathers claimed the phrase was derived from Khabs-am Pekht, which in the Egyptian language means roughly "light in extension" or "light rushing out in a single ray", which is used in the Hermetic Order of the Golden Dawn's Vernal and Autumnal Equinox ceremonies. This is the meaning which Crowley ascribes to the phrase within the book.

The front cover image, portraying the title Konx Om Pax in stretched letters, is said to have been designed by Crowley while smoking hashish.

== Contents ==
=== Introduction ===
Syncretic materials introduce the work:

- Ave: in John Dee and Edward Kelley's Enochian language;
- the Egyptian hieroglyphs for the Stele of Ankh-f-n-khonsu

Three full pages of quotations introduce this work, signaling the syncretic intention of the author. Many sacred texts and sources such as Dante, Catullus, and Jesus are quoted.

=== The Wake World ===
An allegory for the ascent of a magical practitioner through the Kabbalistic Tree of Life, guided by their Holy Guardian Angel (the "Fairy Prince"). After the fashion of Lewis Carroll's Alice's Adventures in Wonderland, Crowley uses the narrative as an explanatory jaunt through this metaphysical schema. It was originally written for Crowley's daughter, Lola Zaza, as a bedtime story.

=== Thien Tao, or, the Synagogue of Satan ===
This parodic essay casts a Crowley character (Master Kwaw) as a Taoist advisor to the Japanese "Daimio" (daimyō) in a time of crisis. Kwaw advises a course of study in which people shall be taught the antithesis of their natural tendencies: the prostitute to learn chastity, the prude to learn sexual expression, the religious bigot to learn Huxley's materialism, the atheist to learn ceremonial magick.

=== Ali Sloper, or, the Forty Liars: A Christmas Diversion ===
A play that is over-presented with title credits, but is generally a simple dialogue based on Crowley's conversation with a friend and his wife on Christmas Day. With only two main speakers Crowley satirizes himself as "Bowley", with the whole a means to present his inserted essay Ameth. The title is a mock of Ali Baba and the 40 Thieves, a tale from the classic One Thousand and One Nights.

=== Stone of the Philosophers Which Is Hidden in the Mountain of Abiegnus ===
A satirical conversation between a number of men, including "a socialist" and "a doctor", each one contributing a poem into their philosophical debate. Here Crowley takes the stance as "Basil Gray"; the work contains La Gitana, his popular love poem. It is thought that this work was inspired by the Zohar, where each Rabbi would contribute a commentary on the Tanakh.

== Editions ==
- Yoga Publication Society. June 1982. ISBN 0-911662-49-9
- Teitan Press. Reprint edition, March 1990. ISBN 0-933429-04-5

== See also ==
- Aleister Crowley bibliography
