= Clouds without Water =

1909 poetry collection by Aleister Crowley

Clouds without Water is a poetry collection by Aleister Crowley (1875–1947), an English writer, occult magician, mountaineer and founder of the religious philosophy of Thelema. Clouds without Water was one of many of Crowley's eccentric works published in his lifetime and was first issued in 1909. The title comes from a passage in Jude 1:12-13 which is quoted at the beginning of the book:

Clouds they are without water; carried about of winds; trees whose fruit withereth, without fruit, twice dead, plucked up by the roots; raging waves of the sea, foaming out their own shame; wandering stars, to whom is reserved the blackness of darkness forever.

As with many other books of Crowley's, such as The Scented Garden of Abdullah and Alice, an Adultury, this work was first published under the pseudonym "the Rev. C. Verey". Within the introduction there is a claim the starkly esoteric poems were discovered as an anonymous manuscript and presented only as a means to condemn them. Given in the end of the book are notes humorously contemptuous of the text, Crowley sarcastically portraying a pious clergyman before praying to be freed of such "sin".

== Editions ==
- Clouds without Water, privately printed, 1909.
- Clouds without Water, reprint, Yogi Publication Society, Des Plaines, Illinois, 1974, ISBN 0-911662-50-2

== See also ==
- Aleister Crowley bibliography
