= Mandrake of Oxford =

Occult book publisher

- Founded: 1986; 40 years ago (as Golden Dawn Publications)
- Founder: Mogg Morgan
- Country of origin: United Kingdom
- Headquarters location: Oxford, England
- Key people: Mogg Morgan (Chairman & CEO)
- Publication types: Books
- Nonfiction topics: Magic, Occultism, Tantra, Thelema
- Official website: www.mandrake.uk.net

Mandrake of Oxford is a specialist independent publisher based in Oxford, England, primarily known for the publication of "hands-on" books for occult practitioners. The company was started in 1986 under the name Golden Dawn Publications, but changed its name to Mandrake upon the publication of Sexual Magick by Katon Shual (a pen-name of founder Mogg Morgan) in 1988. Mandrake publishes texts on Hermeticism, magick, occulture, Qabalah, sex magic, tantra, and Thelema.

In 1992, Mandrake published Aleister Crowley's The Equinox, Volume I, Number 1 to 10.

== Founder ==
Mandrake's founder, Mogg Morgan, when interviewed by occultebooks, said that he chose the name in 1987 as an homage to Aleister Crowley (see Mandrake Press) and that he prefers to publish new writers who are continuing to develop the Thelemic tradition.

== Publications ==
Mandrake of Oxford is known for publishing German occultist freestyle shaman Jan Fries. The company also published for five issues an annual peer-reviewed Journal for the Academic Study of Magic. Other notable publications include:

- Shual, Katon (1988). Sexual Magick & Other Essays. Mandrake. ISBN 1-869928-05-9. Katon Shual is the pen name of Mogg Morgan.
- Wilson, Snoo (1990). More Light: A Play about the Heretic Giordano Bruno. Mandrake. ISBN 1-869928-08-3.
- Fries, Jan (1992). Visual Magick: A Practical Guide to Trance, Sigils and Visualization Techniques. Mandrake. ISBN 1-869928-18-0.
- Drury, Nevill (1993). Pan's Daughter: The Magical World of Rosaleen Norton. Mandrake. ISBN 1-869928-31-8.
- Fries, Jan (1993). Helrunar: A Manual of Rune Magick. Mandrake. ISBN 1-869928-19-9.
- Shual, Katon (1995). Sexual Magick. Mandrake of Oxford. ISBN 1-869928-40-7.
- Fries, Jan (1996). Seidways: Shaking, Swaying and Serpent Mysteries. Mandrake. ISBN 1-869928-36-9.
- Zvelebil, Kamil Veith (1996). The Siddha Quest for Immortality. Mandrake. ISBN 1-869928-43-1.
- Fries, Jan (1998). Living Midnight: Three Movements of the Tao. Mandrake. ISBN 1-869928-50-4.
- Ashe, Steven (2002). Qabalah of 50 Gates. Mandrake of Oxford. ISBN 1-869928-23-7.
- Mirabello, Mark (2002). The Cannibal Within. Mandrake. ISBN 1-869928-27-X.
- Fries, Jan (2003). Cauldron of the Gods: A Manual of Celtic Magick. Mandrake. ISBN 1-869928-70-9.
- Harris, Nathaniel J. (2004). Witcha: A Book of Cunning. Mandrake. ISBN 1-869928-77-6.
- Mirabello, Mark (2004). The Odin Brotherhood. Mandrake. ISBN 1-869928-71-7.
- Visible, Les (2004). The Dark Splendour. Mandrake. ISBN 1-869928-69-5.
- Vayne, Julian; Humphries, Greg (2004). Now That's What I Call Chaos Magick. Mandrake. ISBN 1-869928-74-1.
- Barber, John (2006). Camden Town Murder: The Life and Death of Emily Dimmock. Mandrake of Oxford. ISBN 1-869928-14-8.
- Hedger, Mary (2006). Occult High. History of Fun. Vol. 2. ISBN 1-869928-73-3.
- Mirabello, Mark (2009). Handbook for Rebels and Outlaws: Resisting Tyrants, Hangmen, and Priests. Mandrake. ISBN 978-1-906958-00-8.
- Parry, David (2009). The Grammar of Witchcraft. Mandrake of Oxford. ISBN 978-1-906958-05-3.
- Bolot, Xavier (2017). Drawing in Real Perspective. Mandrake of Oxford. ISBN 978-1906958770.
- Atanes, Carlos (2022). Chaos Magic For Skeptics. Mandrake of Oxford. ISBN 978-1914153174.

=== Periodicals ===
Mandrake's periodicals include:

- Nuit-Isis
- Wilson, Snoo; Morgan, Mogg, eds. (22 October 1994). Thelemic Magick. Vol. I: being the proceedings of the Ninth International Symposium of Thelemic Magick. Oxford: Golden Dawn Publications. ISBN 1-869928-44-X.
- Akashanath; Ashe, Steven; Morgan, Mogg, eds. (21 October 1995). Thelemic Magick. Vol. II: being the proceedings of the Tenth International Symposium of Thelemic Magick. Oxford: Golden Dawn Publications. ISBN 1-869928-48-2.
- Davisson, Sven, ed. (2003). Ashé Journal: Selections from the Journal of Experimental Spirituality. Mandrake. ISBN 1-869928-80-6.

== Footnotes ==
=== Works cited ===
- Evans, Dave (2007). The History of British Magic After Crowley: Kenneth Grant, Amado Crowley, Chaos Magic, Lovecraft, the Left Hand Path, Blasphemy and Magical Morality. Hidden Publishing. ISBN 978-0-9555237-0-0.
