= Journal for the Academic Study of Magic =

British academic journal, 2003–2008

The Journal for the Academic Study of Magic (JSM) was the journal of the Society for the Academic Study of Magic (SASM), a multidisciplinary group formed in 2002 by Alison Butler and Dave Evans of the University of Bristol. The group was composed of scholars studying all aspects of magic and esotericism.

Published annually by Mandrake of Oxford, JSM ran for five issues, from 2003 to 2008. (Note: JSM was not published in 2006.) It contained topical articles, news, and book reviews, and is indexed and/or abstracted in several scholarly databases, including Academic Search Complete, Biography Index, Social Sciences Abstracts, Social Sciences Index, and Social Sciences Full Text.
