= The Diary of a Drug Fiend =

1922 novel by Aleister Crowley

- Author: Aleister Crowley
- Cover artist: Aleister Crowley
- Language: English
- Genre: Occult Novel
- Publication date: 1922
- Publication place: United Kingdom
- Media type: Print (Paperback)
- Pages: 383 pp

The Diary of a Drug Fiend, published in 1922, was occult writer and mystic Aleister Crowley's first published novel, and is also reportedly the earliest known reference to the Abbey of Thelema in Sicily.

== Synopsis ==
The story is widely thought to be based upon Crowley's own drug experiences, despite being written as a fiction. This seems almost conclusively confirmed by Crowley's statement in the novel's preface: "This is a true story. It has been rewritten only so far as was necessary to conceal personalities." Crowley's own recreational drug use and also his personal struggle with drug addiction, particularly heroin, is well documented. Crowley made a study of drugs and their effects upon the body and mind, experimenting widely on himself. Many of his conclusions are present within this novel. Diary of a Drug Fiend encapsulates much of Crowley's core philosophy concerning Thelema and his conception of True Will.

== Plot ==
The story follows Sir Peter Pendragon, a noble, aristocratic World War I veteran pilot who has come into a large inheritance following the death of his paternal uncle. Prior to the war Pendragon had been a medical student, and now finds himself dealing with depression and lacking direction. During a night out he encounters Louise Laleham, a devotee of occultist Basil King Lamus. Pendragon and Laleham quickly fall in love with each other and cocaine. The couple marry soon after meeting then leave for Europe for their honeymoon. While in Europe, they begin using heroin and engage in a drug binge stretching from France to Italy. While in Italy, their luggage and valuables are stolen by a school acquaintance of Pendragon's named Elgin Feccles, whom they had hired as a guide. Soon afterwards they return to England.

Back in England, the protagonists find themselves desperate after their drug supply diminishes due to laws that had been passed during their honeymoon. They move from the Pendragons' country estate to a room in a slum house on Greek Street. Their decline in health and financial problems leads to the couple making several unsuccessful attempts to quit heroin. The particulars of their desperate addiction and cravings are documented in realistic detail. During one of their attempts, they move back to their country estate. While there, the couple begins experimenting with magick. Louise is successfully able to communicate with her Holy Guardian Angel Keletiel. Peter's own experiments with magick and quitting heroin do not go as well, and in a moment of frustration he shoots himself in the chest. Louise nurses him back to health, but they soon fall back into a lifestyle of addiction.

The couple then moves back to London and engages in another drug binge. Fearing no way out of addiction, they go to a restaurant and plan on killing themselves by drinking Prussic acid. The pair, however, are saved from destruction by Basil King Lamus, who agrees to help them with their addiction. Under Lamus' guidance the couple experiences some successes with their battle against addiction. One day, the Pendragons meet with two of their friends, Jabez Platt and Gretel Webster. The former had been behind the laws making cocaine illegal in Great Britain and now wants to buy a cocaine production factory in Switzerland. The latter had been the couple's supplier since their honeymoon.

Peter's initial interest in financing the purchase of the cocaine factory upsets Louise so much that she threatens him with divorce and to leave him for Lamus. Lamus agrees to take Louise away from Peter as he had promised her during her fit of rage and to help her with her addiction, but only on the condition that Peter comes with them. The now unhappy couple and Lamus leave England for an Abbey of Thelema located near the fictional location of Telephylus. Lamus then frees Peter and Louise from their addictions through the use of Magical techniques, aimed at mastering True Will and releasing the individual from sloth, self-destructive impulses and craving. Through self-reflection, Peter discovers that he had turned to drugs and had been generally unhappy because he had not wanted to be a medical doctor; instead, he had wanted to be an aircraft engineer. Louise's True Will is discovered to be helping Peter reach his own True Will by loving him and caring for him.

== Contents ==
=== Book I: Paradiso ===
The first book is narrated by Peter Pendragon.

- Chapter I: A Knight Out
- Chapter II: Over the Top!
- Chapter III: Phaeton
- Chapter IV: Au Pays de Cocaine
- Chapter V: A Heroin Heroine
- Chapter VI: The Glitter on the Snow
- Chapter VII: The Wings of the Oof-Bird
- Chapter VIII: Vedere Napoli e poi-Pro Patria-Mori
- Chapter IX: The Gatto Fritto
- Chapter X: The Bubble Bursts

=== Book II: Inferno ===
The second book is narrated by Louise Laleham.

- Chapter I: Short Commons
- Chapter II: Indian Summer
- Chapter III: The Grinding of the Brakes
- Chapter IV: Below the Brutes
- Chapter V: Towards Madness
- Chapter VI: Cold Turkey
- Chapter VII: The Final Plunge

=== Book III: Purgatorio ===
The third book is narrated once more by Peter Pendragon.

- Chapter I: King Lamus Intervenes
- Chapter II: First Aid
- Chapter III: The Voice of Virtue
- Chapter IV: Out of Harms Way
- Chapter V: At Telephylus
- Chapter VI: The True Will
- Chapter VII: Lover under Will

Note: The titles of the three books are allusions to the books of the Divine Comedy by Dante Alighieri, but here given out of their original order, with the 3rd book first, the 1st second and 2nd book listed third.

== Characters ==
- Sir Peter Pendragon, K.B.E
- Louise "Lou" Laleham
- Basil King Lamus (Based on Aleister Crowley)
- Gretel Webster
- Jabez Platt
- Elgin Feccles
- Haidee Lamoureux (Based on Jane Cheron)
- Mabel Black
- Dr. Andrew McCall
- Maisie Jacobs
- Lala
- Hermes
- Dionysus
- Sister Athena
- Sister Cypris (Based on Ninette Shumway)

== Editions ==
- 1922, First edition published in the U.K., hardback
- 1970, USA, University Books, Inc. (Library of Congress Catalog Card Number: 75-130401), hardback
- 1971, USA, Red Wheel/Weiser Books (ISBN 0-87728-035-5), July 1971, hardback
- 1971, USA, Red Wheel/Weiser Books (ISBN 0-87728-146-7), July 1971, paperback
- 1981 USA, Samuel Weiser, Inc. (ISBN 0-87728-035-50-87728-035-5), 6th printing, paperback
- 1989, USA, Buccaneer Books (ISBN 0-89966-593-4), June 1989, hardback
- 2014, USA, Enhanced Media Publishing (ISBN 978-1497363960), Revised edition, 2016.

== See also ==
- Aleister Crowley bibliography
