= Ankh-ef-en-Khonsu i =

Ancient Egyptian priest

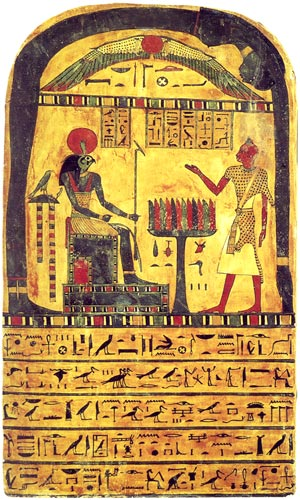
Stele Cairo A 9422 (Bulaq 666), depicting Nut, Behdety as the winged solar disk, Ra-Horakhty seated on his throne, and the stele's owner, Ankh-ef-en-Khonsu i, standing on the right.

Ankh-ef-en-Khonsu i (Egyptian: ꜥnḫ-f-n-ḫnsw), otherwise known as Ankh-af-na-Khonsu, was a priest of the ancient Egyptian god Montu who lived in Thebes during the 25th and 26th Dynasty (c. 725 BCE). He was the son of Bes-en-Mut I and Ta-neshet.

Among practitioners of the Western esoteric tradition and religious philosophy of Thelema, founded by the English occultist and ceremonial magician Aleister Crowley, he is best known under the name of Ankh-af-na-khonsu and as the dedicant of the Stele of Revealing, a wooden offering stele made to ensure his continued existence in the netherworld, now located in the Egyptian Museum of Cairo, Egypt.

== Meaning of the name ==
The name Ankh-ef-en-Khonsu (ꜥnḫ-f-n-ḫnsw) translates as "He lives for Khonsu"; the name is particularly common during the Third Intermediate and Late Periods.

== The Stele ==
The Stele of Ankh-ef-en-Khonsu (Cairo A 9422, formerly Bulaq 666) is a painted, wooden offering stele. The stele is a fairly typical example of a Theban offering stele from the late Third Intermediate Period, dating to the late 25th Dynasty/early 26th Dynasty. It was originally discovered in 1854 as part of a large burial of priests of Montu at Deir el-Bahari in Luxor, Ottoman Egypt, and included the coffin of the dedicant, Ankh-ef-en-Khonsu i.

A translation of the text of the stela can be found at Stele of Ankh-ef-en-Khonsu.

== In Thelema ==
Aleister Crowley used the "magical" name "Ankh-f-n-khonsu" (from the "Stele 666" translation prepared in 1904 for Crowley by the German Egyptologist Émile Brugsch) to sign "The Comment" of The Book of the Law, and also used it sometimes when referring to himself as the prophet of Thelema and the Aeon of Horus. Kenneth Grant wrote that "Crowley claimed to have been a re-embodiment of the magical current represented by the priesthood to which Ankh-af-na-Khonsu belonged".

== Sources ==
- Thelemapedia. (2004). Ankh-af-na-khonsu. Retrieved April 14, 2006.
