= Snowdrops from a Curate's Garden =

1904 collection of obscene stories by Aleister Crowley

- Author: Aleister Crowley
- Language: English
- Genre: Erotic poetry
- Publisher: Chicago: Teitan Press, 1986
- Publication date: 1904
- Publication place: France
- Media type: Print (Paperback)
- Pages: 144 pp

Snowdrops from a Curate's Garden is a collection of obscene stories and poems. It was the project of the English author and occultist Aleister Crowley, under the pseudonym "George Archibald Bishop", and published in Paris in 1904. Crowley had used the same pseudonym, the surname of which was taken from an uncle he disliked, for his previous work White Stains.

== Background and conception ==
Crowley wrote the first part of Snowdrops from a Curate's Garden, called The Nameless Novel, for his wife Rose Edith Kelly to read while she was recovering from the birth of their first child. The book was vulgar, to parody of the romance novels she enjoyed. Bored with the vocabulary in traditional romance novels, Crowley used Slang and its Analogues by William Ernest Henley and John Stephen Farmer as a reference and invented his own words throughout writing. He wrote one chapter a day, and each day he would read the latest completed chapter aloud to his wife and guests.

Many of the poems in Snowdrops were ones that Crowley had written previously in order to practice his technique.

== Publication ==
In late October of 1904, Crowley visited Philippe Renouard in Paris to have one hundred copies of Snowdrops from a Curate's Garden published for his friends. Both the publishing location (Cosmopoli) and year (1881) printed on these copies were fabricated, taken from the gay erotic novels Teleny, or The Reverse of the Medal and The Sins of the Cities of the Plain respectively. Crowley gifted a copy of Snowdrops to Jules Jacot-Guillarmod after he had given Crowley a copy of his recent Six mois dans l'Himalaya. Most of the original copies of Snowdrops were destroyed in 1925, and the book was reprinted in 1986 by Teitan Press.

== Plot and structure ==
Snowdrops from a Curate's Garden is framed as a private manuscript by a man named Jabez Balfour which was stolen and published by George Archibald Bishop. The book is split into four sections, the largest of which is The Nameless Novel which follows the absurd sexual adventures of "the Archbishop" with several other characters of varying sexes. The other three sections are Juvenilia (containing two short stories and a poem), The Bromo Book (a series of erotic parodies), and Limericks (a collection of vulgar poems and songs).

== Selected contents ==
=== The Nameless Novel ===
- "The Cocksucker’s Crime; or, the Cunt of the Countess"
- "The Voluptuous Villagers; or, Vice on the Varm"
- "Juggling with Joy-jelly; or, The Ecclesiastic’s Exploit"
- "The Futile Fuck-stick; or, The Distiller’s Dilemma"
- "The Queen’s Quandary; or, Leaves from the Journal of my Life in the Highlands"
- "The King’s Appendix"
- "My Aunt’s Amusement; or, Aching for Arse-plugs"
- "The Frigging Photographers; or, The Secrets of a Sommier"
- "Tupping a Tombstone; or, The Corpse and the Cleric"
- "The Birch and the Bottom; or, A Milliner’s Manners"
- "A Family Fuck"
- "The Casuist’s Collapse; and the Apotheosis of the Archbishop; also, A Punk’s Parturition"

=== Poetry ===
- Stephanos - parody of Dolores (Notre-Dame des Sept Douleurs) by A. C. Swinburne
- To pe or not to pe - parody of To be, or not to be by Shakespeare
- Outside the Spanish Cloister (ode to A.W.P. esq) - parody of Soliloquy of the Spanish Cloister by Robert Browning

== Bibliography ==
- Crowley, Aleister (1904). Snowdrops from a Curate’s Garden (PDF). Archived from the original (PDF) on 1 June 2022.
- Crowley, Aleister (1989) [1979]. Grant, Kenneth; Symonds, John (eds.). The confessions of Aleister Crowley: an autohagiography. (London): Arkana. ISBN 0-14-019189-5.
- Kaczynski, Richard (2002). Perdurabo : the life of Aleister Crowley. Tempe, Ariz.: New Falcon. ISBN 1-56184-170-6. OCLC 51576246.
- Kaczynski, Richard (2010). Perdurabo, Revised and Expanded Edition: The Life of Aleister Crowley. Berkeley: North Atlantic Books. ISBN 978-1-58394-576-6.
