= Louis Wilkinson =

British author

- Born: Louis Umfreville Wilkinson; 17 December 1881; Aldeburgh, Suffolk, England
- Died: 12 September 1966 (aged 84); Westcott Barton, Oxfordshire, England
- Education: Pembroke College, Oxford; St John's College, Cambridge
- Occupations: Novelist and biographer
- Writing career
- Pen name: Louis Marlow
- Period: 1905–1964

Louis Umfreville Wilkinson (17 December 1881 – 12 September 1966) was a British author, lecturer and biographer who usually wrote under the pseudonym Louis Marlow. In a long career he associated with a number of the prominent literary figures of his day, in particular the Powys brothers John Cowper, Theodore ("T.F.") and Llewelyn. He also formed close friendships with Frank Harris, Somerset Maugham, and the notorious occultist and magician Aleister Crowley.

As a schoolboy at Radley College, Wilkinson instigated a lively correspondence with Oscar Wilde, then living in exile in France. After a short spell at Pembroke College, Oxford, from which he was dismissed for blasphemy, Wilkinson attended St John's College, Cambridge, where he established a formidable literary and personal reputation – he was known as "the Archangel". In 1905, while still at Cambridge, he wrote and published his first novel. After graduating, he embarked on a career as a lecturer in English literature, mainly in the United States, where he spent most of the following fifteen years and became part of a lively American literary scene. Wilkinson began to write seriously in 1915, and during the next forty years produced a substantial quantity of fiction and biography. In the 1920s he began using the Marlow name, which he retained in his published work for the remainder of his creative life. His books were usually well received by the critics, although their overall impact was modest and stirred little scholarly interest.

After the Second World War, Wilkinson caused a minor sensation when, at Crowley's cremation in December 1947, in accordance with the deceased's expressed wishes, he recited the latter's pagan poem "Hymn of Pan" and other sacrilegious texts – although he was not himself a follower. In addition to his novels he wrote several biographical works, and helped to edit the correspondence of the Powys brothers. After his memoir, Seven Friends, published in 1953, he faded into relative obscurity, producing little further published work before his death in 1966. He married four times, being twice widowed and twice divorced.

== Life ==
=== Early life, schooling, and Oscar Wilde ===
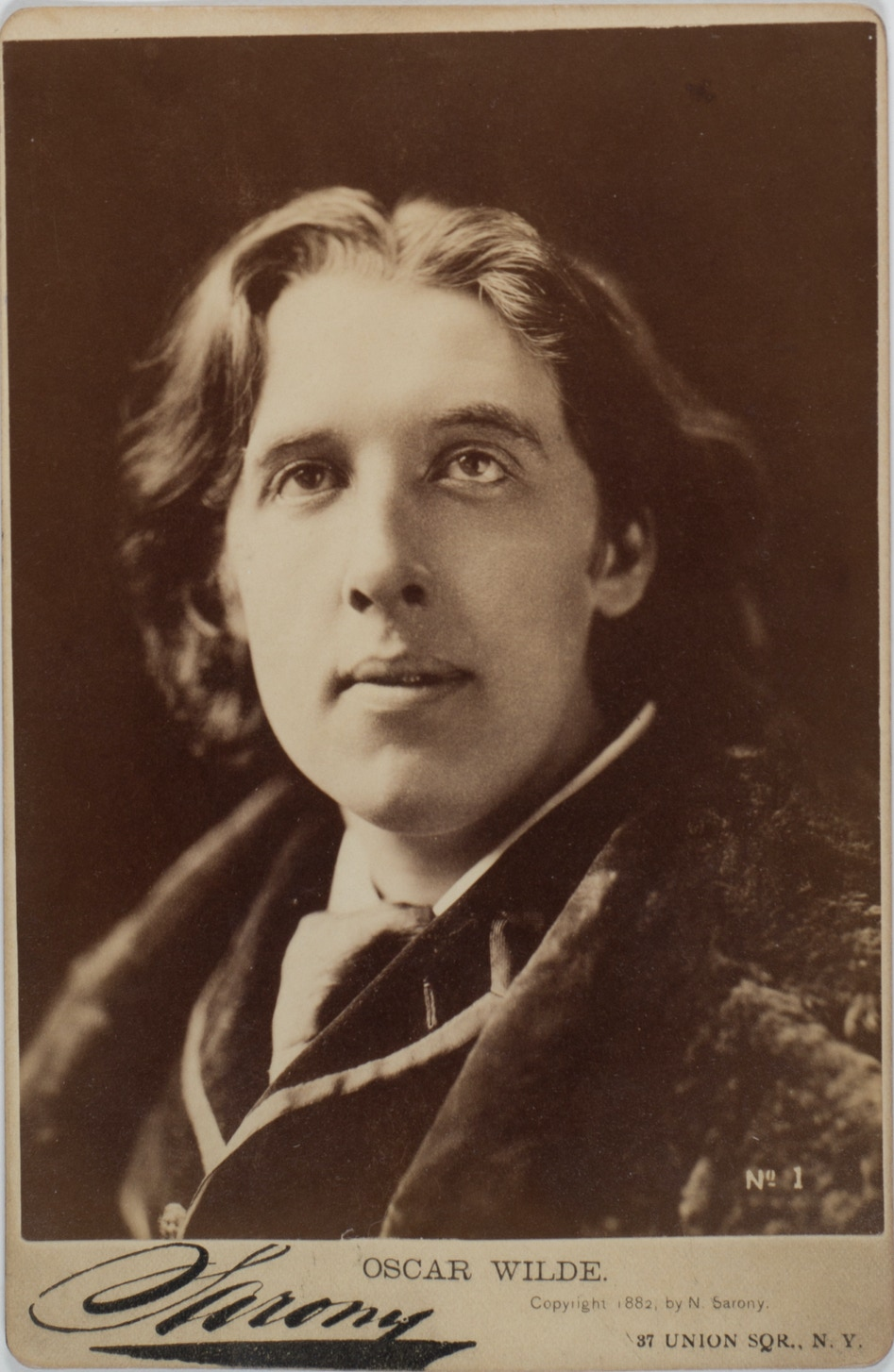
Oscar Wilde

Wilkinson was born on 17 December 1881, in the Suffolk town of Aldeburgh, the only son of a clergyman, the Rev. Walter George Wilkinson and his wife Charlotte Elizabeth. At the time of his son's birth, Wilkinson senior was running the Aldeburgh Lodge preparatory school, (Note: The Revd Wilkinson founded the school in Lowestoft in 1868 and moved it to Aldeburgh in 1870. In 1937 the school moved again, to Orwell Park in Nacton, near Ipswich, and became Orwell Park School.) where Louis received his early education. At the age of 14 he won a scholarship to Radley College, one of England's leading public schools.

At Radley, Wilkinson became fascinated by the case of Oscar Wilde, who in May 1895 was convicted of gross indecency after two trials and imprisoned for two years. On release in May 1897 Wilde went to France, and by March 1898 was living in Paris, in the Hotel d'Alsace. Wilkinson discovered this address and in December 1898 wrote to the exile, ostensibly to ask for permission to mount a dramatised version of The Picture of Dorian Gray. Wilde responded warmly, and over the following eighteen months the two exchanged a number of affectionate letters. On 28 November 1899 Wilde asked Wilkinson for a photograph; on 4 January he informed Wilkinson that "the only thing really nice in the whole hotel is your own photograph", and signs off "Ever your friend, Oscar". An attempt of a meeting in July 1900, the year of Oscar Wilde's death, came to nothing. Wilde wrote to Wilkinson a short letter on 15 July: "Dear Boy,/Come and see me next week. I can get you a room in my hotel./I am not going to write to you any more: I want to see you. I have waited long enough.", but a few days later he wrote in French he was very sick, to Wilkinson not go in that week and that he would write to him: "Je suis très malade. Ne venez pas cette semaine. Je vous écrirai." Wilde and Wilkinson never met.

Lindsay Smith, in Oscar Wilde and the Cultures of Childhood (Bristow 2017), suggests that Wilkinson was a proxy for Wilde's son Cyril, with whom by law Wilde was not permitted contact. After Wilde's death on 30 November 1900, Wilkinson sent a wreath. Wilde's friend Robert Ross added Wilkinson's name to a list he prepared "of those who had shown kindness to [Oscar] during or after his imprisonment". This association with Wilde deeply affected Wilkinson, and led him to become a passionate advocate against England's repressive laws against homosexuality.

=== Oxford and Cambridge ===
On leaving school in 1899, Wilkinson was accepted at Pembroke College, Oxford to study classics. Unhappy with the college's overt religiosity, he and a group of friends rejected Christianity and declared an allegiance to atheism. Wilkinson's anti-imperialist views and his opposition to the Boer War added to his unpopularity with the authorities, as did his continued championing of Wilde, a large photograph of whom decorated his rooms. He and his friends were suspected of conducting mock Masses and Confessions; After four terms the Master, John Mitchinson, a former bishop of Barbados, dismissed Wilkinson and his friends from the college on the grounds of supposed immorality and blasphemy.

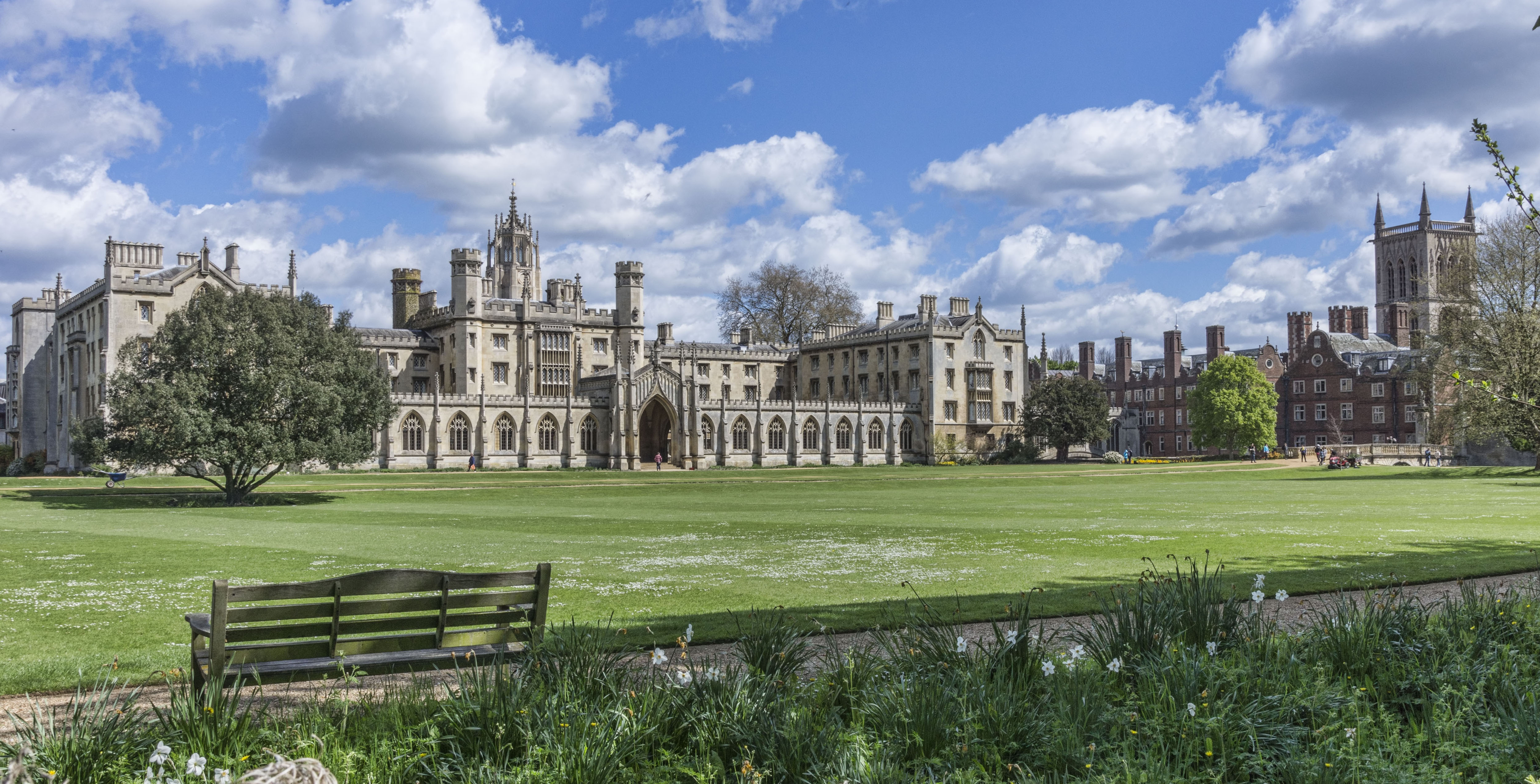
St John's College, Cambridge

After the journalist and former Liberal MP Henry Labouchère had campaigned in his journal Truth against what he called "the Varsity Star Chamber", Wilkinson was admitted in 1902 to St John's College, Cambridge. His stay at Cambridge was happier and more fruitful; after his Oxford experiences he took care to avoid being publicly associated with anything that was scandalous or blasphemous. Among his closest Cambridge friends was the future essayist and novelist Llewelyn Powys, whose elder brother, Theodore, Wilkinson had known in his Aldeburgh schooldays. (Note: Llewelyn and T.F. Powys, together with their eldest brother John Cowper Powys, became the best known of the eleven Powys children born to the Reverend C.F. Powys, of whom most achieved some distinction in life. The initial Powys connection to Wilkinson came through their respective mothers, who had been friends since girlhood.) Other notable associates included the future literary editor J. C. Squire and the future colonial governor Ronald Storrs. Among his contemporaries he acquired the nickname "the Archangel", perhaps on account of his physical and mental attributes, but possibly because of his perceived status as a fallen angel. John Cowper Powys, Llewelyn's eldest brother, described Wilkinson at this time as "a resplendent personage", tall, powerfully built and handsome, "full of an irresponsible and heathen zest for adventure". Llewelyn likened him in appearance to Aubrey Beardsley.

In 1904 Wilkinson met Somerset Maugham when the latter's play, A Man of Honour was performed in Cambridge. Maugham was not yet well known; Wilkinson found him "unobtrusive, rather wary, unusually good-looking", although the play impressed him. Maugham and Wilkinson would resume their acquaintance some years later, and a strong friendship would develop; in due course Wilkinson would write that: "[b]y comparison to Maugham, [Bernard] Shaw seemed ... a writer of pseudo-plays a freak, [John] Galsworthy a mediocrity and [J.M.] Barrie a mess". During his final year at Cambridge, in 1905, Wilkinson wrote and published his first novel, The Puppet's Dallying, using the pseudonym "Louis Marlow", a name which he would resurrect as a mature writer in the 1920s.

=== Literary career ===
==== Mainly in America, 1905–early 1920s ====
The Puppet's Dallying did not immediately launch Wilkinson's career as a novelist, although its critical reception was modestly favourable. (Note: According to Frank Harris, the book "though naturally immature, had a certain succès d'estime, being favorably noticed by the more important London journals".) Wilkinson was influenced by John Cowper Powys into trying his hand at university extension lecturing, and accepted an invitation to make a six-month American lecture-tour on English literature in the year 1905–06. This venture proved a success, and was followed by regular further tours. Dissatisfied with the financial terms arranged for him by the American Society for the Extension of University Teaching (ASEUT), in 1910 Wilkinson combined with G. Arnold Shaw, Powys's manager and publisher, to form the University Lecturers Association of New York (ULANY). Thereafter his American activities were organised through this body. In 1914, in recognition of his work, he was awarded an honorary D.Litt degree from St John's College, Annapolis. When not in America, Wilkinson lectured in England and Europe, and developed Oxford University's Extension Lectures syllabus on the 19th century English poets.

In America, Powys introduced Wilkinson to Frances Gregg. She was an established figure on the avant-garde American literary scene, mixing with among others Ezra Pound and "H.D." (Hilda Doolittle), the latter having been for a time her lover. Powys was deeply in love with Gregg, but being married and unwilling to divorce, could not himself pursue matters with her. Instead, in April 1912 Gregg married Wilkinson, causing Powys much long-term jealousy. The unconventional newlyweds invited H.D. to join them on their honeymoon in Venice; she accepted, and prepared to go, but was eventually persuaded otherwise by Pound. The honeymoon was nevertheless eccentric, as the couple were joined in Venice by John Cowper and Llewelyn Powys, where the four behaved, according to one writer, so scandalously that they were arrested, and almost thrown out of the city. (Note: The group were introduced to the famed aesthete Frederick Rolfe, better known as "Baron Corvo", but found him tedious, and made their intentions to avoid him brutally clear when he sought their further company.)

Wilkinson had first met the occultist and writer Aleister Crowley in about 1907, and the two became closer friends after 1915, when they were both living in America. Crowley would later gain notoriety as "The Great Beast" and "The wickedest man in the world". Wilkinson was never a follower of Crowley's teachings – "We hardly ever discussed magic. Nor did we talk much about sex" – but admired him nonetheless: "My chief feeling about him is one of personal gratitude, for I have known very few who, as persons, have impressed me more or rewarded me more than he did". Wilkinson also observed that Crowley's voice and intonation closely resembled that of Winston Churchill.

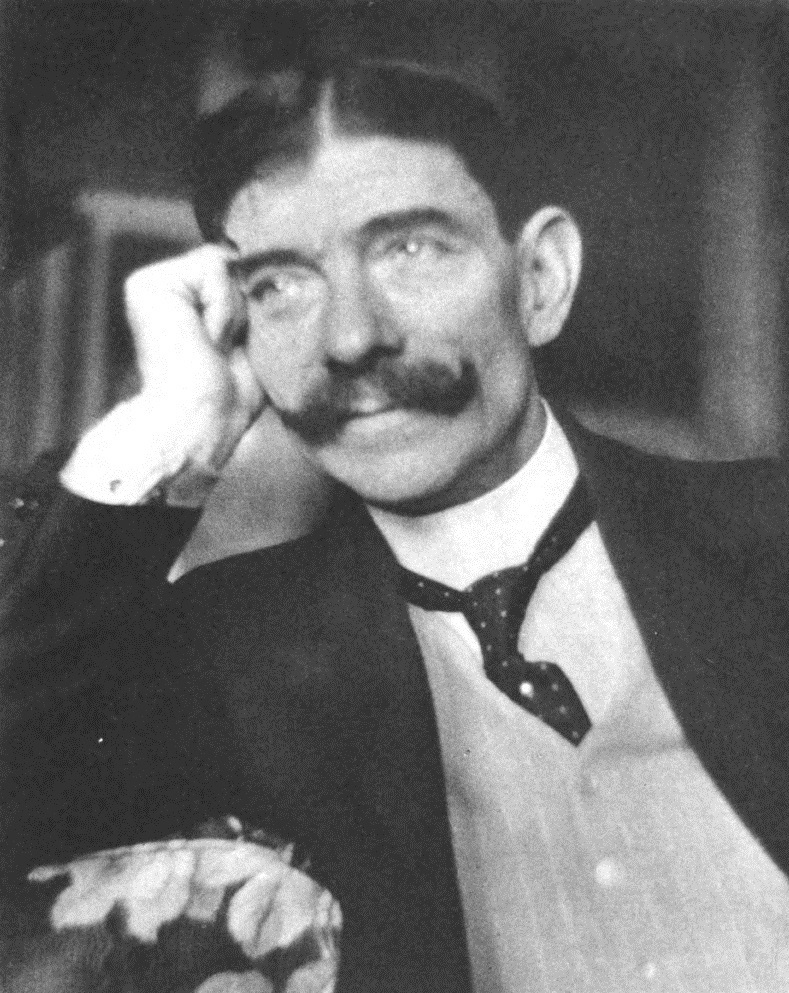
Frank Harris

By 1915, Wilkinson had begun writing again, contributing short stories to publications such as Pearson's Magazine and The Smart Set. In 1916 he wrote the pamphlet "Blasphemy and Religion", in which a fictitious lord and his son discuss two contrasting recent works by John Cowper Powys and his brother T.F: Wood and Stone and The Soliloquy of a Hermit. The dialogue suggested T.F's artistic superiority over his brother. In the same year Wilkinson published his second novel, The Buffoon, in which the principal character is "Jack Welsh", a satirised version of John Cowper Powis. (Note: In his autobiography (1934) Powys described The Buffoon as "that admirable story", while admitting his awareness of Wilkinson's ambivalent feelings towards him, as a writer; Wilkinson stated on another occasion that Powys could write " "ridiculous tedious rubbish".) Two more novels quickly followed: A Chaste Man (1917) and Brute Gods (1919). (Note: The three novels of this period were published under Wilkinson's own name rather than the Marlow pseudonym.) Wilkinson had by this time become acquainted with Frank Harris, the Irish-born journalist, editor and biographer of Wilde, who after a turbulent career in Britain had moved to America at the outset of World War I and later taken American citizenship. Harris considered Brute Gods to be Wilkinson's best work to date: "[It] deserves to be read very carefully even by those who think themselves masters of the story-telling art".

Harris was sufficiently taken with Wilkinson to include him in the third volume of his Contemporary Portraits series, published in 1920. (Note: Harris placed Wilkinson among distinguished company. Other portraits in the volume include H. G. Wells, John Galsworthy, G.K. Chesterton, Winston Churchill and Augustus John.) His encomiums tend to treat Wilkinson, then nearing forty, as a newcomer to the literary scene: "I expect considerable things from Wilkinson ... [he] has the heart of the matter in him ... and so I bid him gird up his loins and give us his very best." Much later, Wilkinson described Harris as "a man of violent projections, brutal, gross, sentimental, and yet poetic ... his hand against every man's and every man's hand against him; but as a person, a talker, he was surely a man of genius".

Since 1915 Wilkinson had been associated with New York's Greenwich Village literary set, and acted as an unofficial mentor to the future poet, essayist and scholar Kenneth Burke. Wilkinson was a constructive critic of the younger man's early literary efforts, advised him what to read, and introduced him to Theodore Dreiser and other established writers. In time Burke developed an enthusiasm for the "moderns" was not encouraged by Wilkinson: "I'm sick to death of the whole blasted lot of them", the latter wrote, adding that James Joyce was absurdly overrated. Despite this division of view Wilkinson and Burke remained on good terms and continued to exchange occasional letters until 1926.

==== Popular British novelist, early 1920s–1946 ====
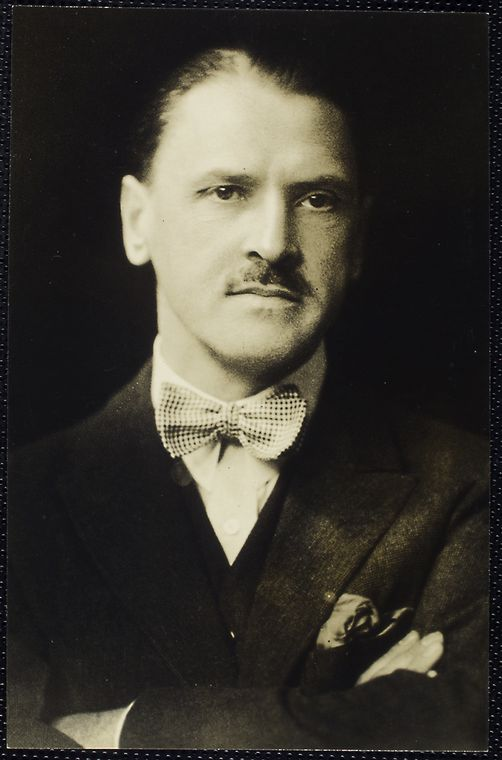
W. Somerset Maugham

In 1923 Wilkinson's marriage to Gregg ended in divorce, and he settled in England to resume his career as a novelist. Under the resurrected pseudonym "Louis Marlow", between 1928 and 1930 he published four novels in quick succession. These works received varying degrees of critical approval, generally favouring his style over the quality of his chosen themes. The first of these, Mr Amberthwaite (1928) is a magical fantasy of which Crowley wrote: "In all literature I know no pages so terrifying as those in Louis Marlow's Mr. Amberthwaite, which describe his dream". The Observer's reviewer thought the story of Love by Accident (1929), turning on the protagonist's self-imposed celibacy, was an inadequate vehicle for the book's more serious injunctions against warmongers and literary censorship. For the third of the books, Two Made Their Beds (1929), an introduction was supplied by Maugham. After their initial meeting in Cambridge, Wilkinson and Maugham had met again in 1909, in Florence, and their friendship subsequently deepened. Maugham's biographer Ted Morgan writes that the older man's interest in the novel arose because it dealt with "the overwhelming significance of money in the affairs of life" – Maugham was, according to Morgan, obsessed with money. When The Lion Took Fright (1930) appeared a year later, The Observer's critic praised the author's probing wit in handling "so disagreeable a theme" (the love of an adolescent girl for an unscrupulous older man). Punch's critic wrote: "Mr Marlow shows an insight into human affairs that deserves more interesting material".

In 1934, Wilkinson published a different kind of book, the autobiographical novel Swan's Milk, in which he represents himself as "Dexter Foothood", and depicts many of his real-life acquaintances, including the Powys brothers, Maugham, Oscar Browning (Note: Oscar Browning, educator and long-time fellow of King's College, Cambridge, was the principal of the Cambridge University Day Training College. He and Wilkinson exchanged correspondence for several years after the latter had left Cambridge.) and others. According to the critic Philip Dodd, in this book "the distinction between fact and fiction is hard to draw, since 'fact' is recorded as being 'fiction' or a fictional character as belonging to 'fact' ". Wilkinson's closest literary friendship remained that with the Powys brothers, and in the mid-1930s he produced his first conventional biographical work, a study of the brothers entitled Welsh Ambassadors. A contemporary review found the book "extraordinarily vivid", adding "Some may find Mr Marlow's revelations of the lives disturbing, for reticence is no part of the Powys code". In a favourable review of Belina Humfrey's account of the brothers (Recollections of the Powys Brothers, 1980), J. Lawrence Mitchell writes: "Only Louis Wilkinson [in Welsh Ambassadors and Swan's Milk] similarly catches the men behind the writers".

After Welsh Ambassadors, Wilkinson was a regular visitor to the Swiss sanatorium where Llewelyn Powys, his closest friend among the brothers, was slowly succumbing to tuberculosis – he died in December 1939. Wilkinson wrote nothing of substance in this period; after his friend's death, he edited The Letters of Llewelyn Powys, which was published in 1943. In 1944 Wilkinson produced his single venture into the science-fiction genre, The Devil in Crystal, described by The Observer's Alan Pryce-Jones as "an odd little fantasy", in which the protagonist, through a warp in time, is able to relive a part of his past life. In 1946, Wilkinson wrote his last full-length novel, Forth, Beast, a sequel to Swan's Milk, in which he reprised his Dexter Foothood persona. Punch's critic observed that the ingenious form of the book allowed the author to portray himself, as Foothood, rather more favourably than might have been possible in a conventional autobiography.

=== Later life, 1946–1966 ===
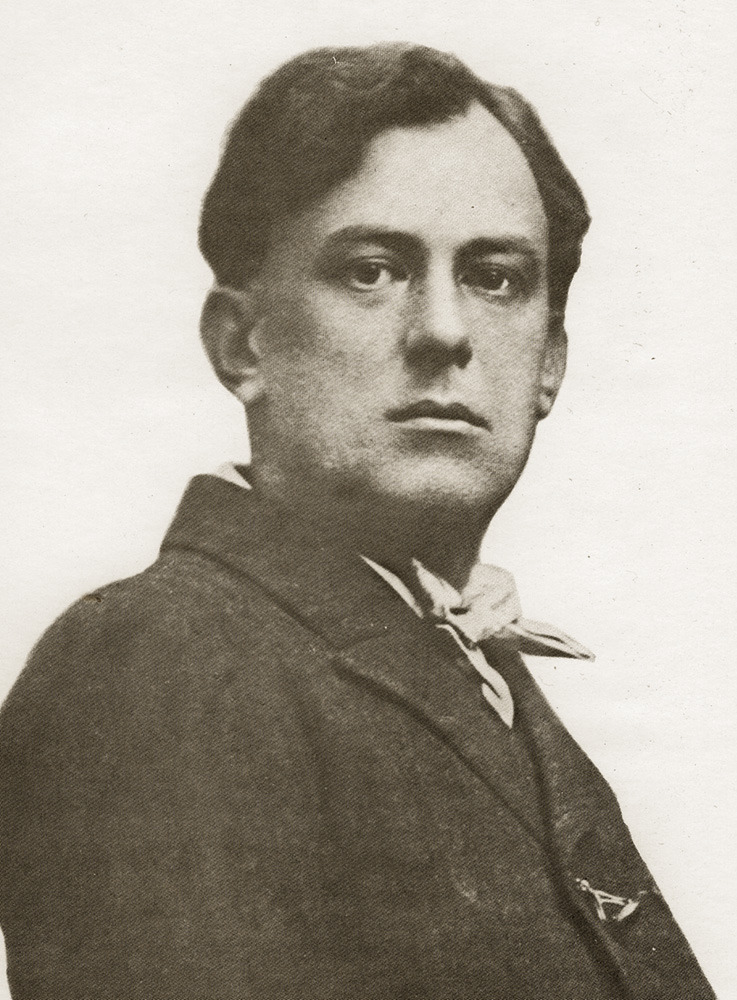
Aleister Crowley

When Crowley, in failing health and virtually penniless, was in need of a new home in 1945, Wilkinson was instrumental in finding him a place in Nethercott, a large boarding-house in the English south coast resort of Hastings. On Crowley's death in December 1947, Wilkinson became one of the estate's three executors. Crowley had requested that there should be no conventional religious service at his cremation, but that passages of his works be should be read, which Wilkinson agreed to do. There was considerable press interest and anticipation as to the form the ceremony, to be held at Brighton Borough Crematorium, would take. On the day, the congregation was equally divided between mourners – Crowley's friends – and reporters. John Symonds, Crowley's biographer, records that "the tall and dignified figure of Louis Wilkinson" read Crowley's poem "Hymn of Pan", extracts from The Book of the Law, and finally Collects from the Gnostic Mass. The attendant press sensationalised the event with lurid headlines, suggesting that a Black Mass had taken place, and the scandalised local authority announced that steps would be taken to prevent any recurrence of such a ceremony.

In 1948, Wilkinson was sufficiently well regarded to be photographed for the National Portrait Gallery by Walter Stoneman. In the same year he published Sackville of Drayton, a biography of George Sackville, 1st Viscount Sackville. The book was reviewed critically by the subject's great-great-grandniece, Vita Sackville-West, who, far from defending her distant kinsman, upbraided Wilkinson for his whitewashing of the viscount, long a pariah in her family. She characterised Sackville as "obstinate, arrogant, coarse-grained, lacking all statesmanlike vision, almost every word and act reported of him contradicts the case that Mr Marlow so gallantly endeavours to put up".

As Wilkinson aged, his literary output diminished. In 1953 he produced his final full-length work, Seven Friends, a compendium of brief lives of some of his more remarkable acquaintances: Wilde, Crowley, Harris, Maugham and the three Powys brothers. In 1954 he served on a committee formed to organise Wilde's centenary celebrations, including the erection of a commemorative plaque at Wilde's Tite Street address. In 1958 he edited and published Letters of John Cowper Powys to Louis Wilkinson, which the reviewer Douglas Hewitt described as "largely a libretto for a performance [by] a pair of outrageously shocking old men". Thereafter Wilkinson lived in quiet retirement; his last published work was a contribution to a series of essays on the works of T.F. Powys which appeared in 1964; Bumbore: a Romance, a short parody of John Cowper Powys's 1916 novel Rodmoor, was not published until 1969, after Wilkinson's death. A second parody, this time of Henry James's 1897 novel What Maisie Knew – it was provisionally entitled "What Percy Knew" – was left incomplete; the available fragment was published privately later. Wilkinson enjoyed a brief return to the public arena with several BBC Radio broadcasts of reminiscences, between February 1964 and May 1965. He died on 12 September 1966 at the home of his son Oliver, at Westcott Barton, near Oxford.

== Appraisal ==
The long interval between Wilkinson's student novel and his second venture in the genre led some reviewers to treat the series of novels he published between 1916 and 1919 as the works of a young newcomer of promise, rather than of a mature writer. Thus, while prophesying "a notable future" for the writer, Punch's reviewer wrote of A Chaste Man, the third novel: "Mr Wilkinson has committed the fault common to clever young novelists of putting into what looks like a first novel all sorts of things that happen to be in his imagination or experience, without any particular regard for their pertinence to his theme". During his writing career Wilkinson received mostly favourable critical comments – words such as "clever", "skilful" and "witty" appear regularly in reviews. (Note: See, for example, reviewers' comments in (Punch 1918), (Wolfe, The Observer 27 October 1929), (The Observer 1930), (Pryce-Jones 1944, p. 3).) He was sometimes chided for the apparent dullness of his themes, and on one occasion for his "galvanic mode of expression", but was generally respected in the literary world, and was elected a Fellow of the Royal Society of Literature. Nevertheless, his standing among the ranks of modern novelists remained relatively modest, and after his death he was largely forgotten. A few of his titles have been reprinted in the late-20th and early 21st centuries, (Note: The Buffoon 1975, A Chaste Man 2010, Brute Gods 2010 and 2012, Welsh Ambassadors 1971 and 1975, Sackville of Drayton 1973, and Seven Friends 1963 and 1992.) but no significant scholarly appraisal of his work has been published. He is unlisted in modern works of literary reference such as The Oxford Companion to English Literature, although the New Cambridge Bibliography of English Literature (1972) supplies a list of his principal works. The main collection of Wilkinson's papers and manuscripts is held by the University of Texas at Austin, in the Harry Ransom Center; a number of letters to the educationist Oscar Browning, dating from 1903 to 1910, are held at King's College, Cambridge.

Wilkinson's role as the premier critic of the Powys brothers was recognised when Kenneth Hopkins dedicated his 1967 study The Powys Brothers to Wilkinson. The Times obituarist thought that Wilkinson had the qualities to be a leading literary critic, had he been prepared for the hard grind of regular reviewing. According to The Times he would be remembered, aside from his professional gifts, as "a ripe and rewarding personality with a genius for friendship." Wilkinson himself thought that he might be remembered only as the man who read the "Hymn of Pan" at Crowley's funeral. Wilkinson's friends often praised him in extravagant terms, and in a typical tribute included in The Letters of John Cowper Powys to Louis Wilkinson, 1935–56, Powys described Wilkinson thus:

"... on top of Integrity & Sang Froid & sexual Rascality worthy of Scarron or Villon or ... even of the Ribald of Arezzo, for from out of Italy come all the origins of all the renaissances of civilisations – there enters with you Dignity, & Diplomatic Urbanity, Suavity, Reserve & Ambassadorial Discretion such as some great Politician (I am not referring to Mr Gladstone) would display on his Augustan path".

Wilkinson's marriage to Frances Gregg produced a son and a daughter. The son Oliver (whose godfathers were John Cowper Powys and Aleister Crowley), was born in 1916, and had a long career as a writer, theatre director and producer, notably in the Iona Theatre, Glasgow, which he founded. He died in 1999. The daughter, Betty, was killed along with Frances and her mother in an air raid on Plymouth in April 1941. (Note: Shortly before her death, Frances Gregg completed a memoir, The Mystic Leeway, which was eventually published in 1995.) After his divorce from Frances, Wilkinson married Ann Reid, a writer and novelist, with whom he had another daughter, the dedicatee of Seven Friends. Reid published two novels: We Are the Dead (1929) and Love Lies Bleeding (1930), before her death in 1932. Wilkinson then married Diana Bryn; his fourth wife was Joan Lamburn, a writer of children's stories, who died in 1956. (Note: Popular in the 1940s, Joan Lamburn's works include The Mushroom Pony, the story of Clippety-Clop (1947), Mr. Soloski's Cats (1948), and The Monkey Trick (1951).) The four wives appear, lightly fictionalised, in Forth, Beast.

== List of works ==
=== Novels ===
(Written as "Louis Marlow" except where stated. Main source: The New Cambridge Bibliography Volume 3.)

- The Puppets' Dallying. London: Greening & Co. 1905. OCLC 6521638.
- The Buffoon. New York: A.A.Knopf. 1916. (as Louis Wilkinson)
- A Chaste Man. New York: A.A. Knopf. 1917. OCLC 645114238. (as Louis Wilkinson)
- Brute Gods. New York: A.A. Knopf. 1919. OCLC 645116667. (as Louis Wilkinson)
- Mr Amberthwaite. London: Victor Gollancz. 1928.
- Love by Accident. London: Victor Gollancz. 1929.
- Two Made Their Beds. London: Victor Gollancz. 1929. OCLC 4060092. (Preface by W. Somerset Maugham)
- The Lion Took Fright. London: Mundanus/Gollancz. 1930. OCLC 763950485.
- Swan's Milk. London: Faber & Faber. 1934. OCLC 492865870.
- Fool's Quarter Day. London: Faber & Faber. 1935. OCLC 990162423.
- La Glu et le Miroir. Bruxelles: Les Editions de Visscher. 1948. OCLC 77259476. (French translation of Fool's Quarter Day, 1935)
- The Devil in Crystal. London: Faber & Faber. 1944. OCLC 752703186.
- Forth Beast!. London: Faber & Faber. 1946. OCLC 10098621. (Novel)
- Bumbore: a Romance. New York: Colgate University Press. 1969. (Novel)

=== Short fiction and other writing ===
(Written as Louis Wilkinson except where otherwise stated. Main source: Galactic Central Publications. )

==== Short stories and novelettes ====
- "The Connoisseur of Emotion, or the Tester of Thrills". The Smart Set May 1915
- "Kangeroodledoo". The Smart Set October 1915
- "The Phantom Baby". The Smart Set December 1915
- "A Question of Nerve". The Smart Set October 1916
- "Else". The Smart Set October 1916
- "The Black Windmill". The International, September 1917
- "The Night-Boat: a Modern Grimace of the Tragic Muse" Pearson’s Magazine (US) July 1918
- "Chrissy’s Way" (with Frances Gregg). The Smart Set, November 1918
- "Her Kindness to Him". Pearson’s Magazine (US) December 1918
- "The Strange Case of Zedekiah". The Smart Set August 1919

==== Essays, criticism and miscellaneous works ====
- Oxford University Extension Lectures. Syllabus of a Course of Seven Lectures on Poets of the Nineteenth Century. Oxford: Hart. 1912.
- Blasphemy and Religion. A Dialogue About John Cowper Powys' 'Wood and Stone' and Theodore Powys' 'The Soliloquy of a Hermit'. Southrepps Warren House Press. 1916. (Booklet, 12 pages)
- "Shakespeare: Rebel, Aristocrat and Pessimist". The International November 1917

=== Biographical works ===
(Written as "Louis Marlow" except where stated. Main source: The New Cambridge Bibliography Volume 3.)

- Welsh Ambassadors: Powys Lives and Letters. London: Chapman and Hall. 1936. (Biography, Powys family)
- The Letters of Llewelyn Powys. London: John Lane. 1943. OCLC 609555136.
- The Brothers Powys: A Paper. Winston-Salem, North Carolina: Lloyd Siberell. 1946. OCLC 24314666. (Biographical sketch)
- Sackville of Drayton. London: Homne & Van Thal. 1948. OCLC 977309896. (Biography of George Sackville, 1st Viscount Sackville)
- Seven Friends. London: The Richards Press Ltd. 1953. (Biographical sketches)

== Notes and references ==
=== Sources ===
- "A Chaste Man – Review". Punch (4066): 323. 13 November 1918.
- Bayley, John (19 May 1995). "A seer of the flesh". The Times Literary Supplement.
- "Books and Authors". The Observer. 5 October 1930. p. 8. ProQuest 481239886. (subscription required)
- "Brave Adventure". The Observer. 3 December 1943. p. 3. ProQuest 485140170. (subscription required)
- Bristow, Joseph, ed. (2017). Oscar Wilde and the Cultures of Childhood. New York: Palgrave Macmillan. ISBN 978-3-319-60410-7.
- Carty, T.J., ed. (2015). A Dictionary of Literary Pseudonyms in the English Language. London: Routledge. ISBN 978-1-57958-209-8.
- Catalog of Copyright Entries: Part 1, Books, Group 1 (1916). Washington DC: Government Printing office. 1916. p. 104. "Blasphemy and Religion – a dialogue Louis Wilkinson."
- Clute, John; Nicholls, Peter (30 January 2017). The Encyclopedia of Science Fiction Online edition. Orion Publishing Group.
- Crowley, Aleister (1954). Magick Without Tears. Hampton, NJ: Thelema Publishing Co. OCLC 50812268.
- Davenport-Hines, Richard (2018). "Harris, James Thomas [Frank]". In Cannadine, David (ed.). Oxford Dictionary of National Biography online edition. London: Oxford University Press. doi:10.1093/ref:odnb/33727. ISBN 978-0-19-861412-8. (subscription required)
- Davenport-Hines, Richard (2018). "Browning, Oscar". In Cannadine, David (ed.). Oxford Dictionary of National Biography online edition. London: Oxford University Press. doi:10.1093/ref:odnb/32128. ISBN 978-0-19-861412-8. (subscription required)
- Decker, Ronald (2018). "Crowley, Aleister [formerly Edward Alexander]". In Cannadine, David (ed.). Oxford Dictionary of National Biography online edition. London: Oxford University Press. doi:10.1093/ref:odnb/37329. ISBN 978-0-19-861412-8. (subscription required)
- Dodd, Philip (1986). Modern Selves: Essays on modern British and American Biography. London: Frank Cass. ISBN 0-7146-3255-4.
- Eliot, Valerie (2013). The Letters of T. S. Eliot Volume 4: 1928-1929. London: Faber & Faber. ISBN 978-0-571-29093-2. (unpaginated ebook)
- Elwin, Malcolm (1946). The Life of Llewelyn Powys. London: John Lane The Bodley Head. OCLC 560213197.
- Evans, B. Ifor (1 March 1936). "The Powys Brothers". The Observer. p. 7. ProQuest 481482632. (subscription required)
- "Forth, Beast! – Review". Punch (5496): 406. 8 May 1946.
- Friedman, Susan Stanford, ed. (2002). Analyzing Freud: Letters of H.D., Bryher, and Their Circle. New York: New Directions. ISBN 0-8112-1499-0.
- Gregg, Frances (1995). Jones, Ben (ed.). The Mystic Leeway. Ottawa: Carleton University Press. ISBN 0-88629-250-6.
- Harris, Frank (1920). Contemporary Portraits (third series). New York: Published by the Author. OCLC 1021320247.
- Hart-Davis, Rupert, ed. (1979). Selected Letters of Oscar Wilde. Oxford: Oxford University Press. ISBN 0-19-281218-1.
- Hewitt, Douglas (20 May 1958). "Script or sincerity". The Manchester Guardian. p. 4. ProQuest 480243903. (subscription required)
- Kaczynski, Richard (2010). Perdurabo: The Life of Aleister Crowley. Berkeley, CA: North Atlantic Books. ISBN 978-1-55643-899-8.
- King, Francis (1978). The Magical World of Aleister Crowley. New York: Coward, McCann & Geoghegan. ISBN 978-0-69810-884-4.
- Krissdottir, Morine (11 October 2007). "Acquiring a taste for John Cowper Powys". The Guardian.
- "The Lion Took Fright – Review". Punch (4701): 31. 7 January 1931.
- Marlow, Louis (1953). Seven Friends. London: The Richards Press. OCLC 763847196.
- Mitchell, J. Lawrence (Spring 1981). "Review: Recollections of the Powys Brothers". Biography. 4 (2): 183–86. doi:10.1353/bio.2010.0929. JSTOR 23539049. S2CID 162225823.
- Morgan, Ted (1980). Somerset Maugham. London: Jonathan Cape. ISBN 0-224-01813-2.
- Wilde, Oscar; Davis-Hard, Rupert. The Letters of Oscar Wilde. Limited, 1962.
- Powys, John Cowper (1934). Autobiography. London: John Lane The Bodley Head. OCLC 623341864.
- Pryce-Jones, Alan (12 March 1944). "A Place for Everything". The Observer. p. 3. ProQuest 481737178. (subscription required)
- Rintoul, M.C. (1993). Dictionary of Real People and Places in Fiction. London and New York: Routledge. p. 752. ISBN 0-415-05999-2. "Louis Wilkinson The Buffoon."
- Sackville-West, Vita (26 September 1948). "Calamitous Hero". The Observer. p. 3. ProQuest 475096823. (subscription required)
- Sampson, George; Churchill, R. C. (1970). The Concise Cambridge History of English Literature. Cambridge: Cambridge University Press. ISBN 978-0-521-09581-5.
- Selzer, Jack (1996). Kenneth Burke in Greenwich Village: Conversing with the Moderns, 1915–1931. Madison, Wisc.: University of Wisconsin Press. p. 209. ISBN 978-0-299-15183-6. "Louis Wilkinson Greenwich village."
- Sewell, Brocard, ed. (1964). Theodore: Essays on T. F. Powys. Faversham, Kent: Saint Albert's Press. OCLC 2136054.
- Smith, Lindsay (2017). "Playing Narcissus to a Photograph". In Bristow, Joseph (ed.). Oscar Wilde and the Cultures of Childhood. Los Angeles: Palgrave Macmillan. ISBN 978-3-319-60411-4.
- Strang, George (28 September 1999). "Oliver Wilkinson". The Glasgow Herald.
- Symonds, John (1951). The Great Beast. London: Rider & Co. OCLC 942408078.
- "Television and Radio: BBC". The Guardian. 17 February 1964. p. 2. ProQuest 184911626. (subscription required)
- "Television and Radio: BBC". The Guardian. 1 January 1965. p. 2. ProQuest 185065632. (subscription required)
- "Television and Radio: BBC". The Guardian. 17 May 1965. p. 2. ProQuest 185035009. (subscription required)
- Wilhelm, J.J (1990). Ezra Pound in London and Paris, 1908–1925. University Park and London: The Pennsylvania University Press. ISBN 978-0-271-02798-2.
- Wilkinson, Louis, ed. (1958). Letters of John Cowper Powys to Louis Wilkinson, 1935-1956. London: Macdonald. OCLC 671507625.
- Wilkinson, Louis (1912). "Oxford University Extension Lectures. Syllabus of a Course of Seven Lectures on Poets of the Nineteenth Century". Oxford: Hart. ASIN B01EOA3O9K. Archived from the original on 18 February 2018.
- Wilkinson, Louis (1969) [Written about the year 1912]. The better end : conclusion of a chapter from the unpublished novel What Percy Knew. OCLC 40591845.
- Willison, I.R., ed. (1972). The New Cambridge Bibliography of English Literature, Vol. 4. Cambridge: Cambridge University Press. ISBN 0-521-08535-7.
- Wolfe, Humbert (27 October 1929). "New Novels". The Observer. p. 6. ProQuest 481202018. (subscription required)
