= Mandrake Press =

- Founded: 1929; 96 years ago (as Mandrake Press Ltd)
- Founder: Edward Goldston, P. R. Stephensen
- Defunct: 1930; 95 years ago
- Country of origin: United Kingdom
- Headquarters location: London, United Kingdom
- Key people: Aleister Crowley (Chairman & CEO)
- Publication types: Books
- Nonfiction topics: Magic, Occultism, Thelema

The Mandrake Press was a British small press founded by Edward Goldston and P. R. Stephensen in 1929. In 1930, the company had financial problems and a consortium led by Aleister Crowley formed Mandrake Press Ltd to take it over. The consortium was likewise unsuccessful, and the company was dissolved in 1930.

== Notable authors ==
Mandrake Press published over 30 items, including D. H. Lawrence, The Paintings of D H Lawrence together with works by Liam O'Flaherty, Rhys Davies, Giovanni Boccaccio, Peter Warlock under the pseudonym Rab Noolas, S. S. Koteliansky, Aleister Crowley, Thomas Burke, Cecil Roth, Beresford Egan, W. J. Turner, Brinsley MacNamara, Edgell Rickword, Richard Barham Middleton, V. V. Rozanov, Philip Owens, Vernon Knowles, and others.

== Notable publications ==
At the 1985 Cambridge University Exhibition of the works of The Mandrake Press, it was believed that no copies of the Book of Tobit, a part of the Catholic bible, had been produced, even though the book had been announced and a prospectus issued. Since then, three copies have been discovered – one in an Australian library and two in private collections.

== Book series ==
- Black Lodge Booklets
- Mandrake Booklets
- Mandrake Press Booklets
