= Letter symbolism =

Symbolic meaning and value of letters

Letter symbolism concerns the symbolic meaning and value of letters (graphic signs representing a phoneme or group of phonemes in written language), whether read or written, in alphabetical script or elsewhere. While the meaning may not be immediately apparent, studying the symbols can reveal the significance of each letter.

Letter symbolism is the study of the alphabet as a symbol, exploring its ability to represent analogically, convey meaning, and carry values beyond its practical or material function. It involves examining letters as symbols (symbology) or systems (symbolic), as well as their capacity for designation, meaning, and potential influence (symbolism). Each letter typically holds its own symbolism, representing the essence of things or their fundamental nature, as evident in Greek etymology (e.g., A symbolizes the beginning).

On the other hand, for those who insist on the view that signs are arbitrary, letter symbolism may be considered as pure delirium. St. Augustine, in On Christian Doctrine (II, 24), expresses his disapproval of what he perceives as superstition: "The letter X, which is made in the shape of a cross, means one thing among the Greeks and another among the Latins, not by nature, but by agreement and prearrangement as to its signification; and so, anyone who knows both languages uses this letter in a different sense when writing to a Greek from that in which he uses it when writing to a Latin. And the same sound, beta, which is the name of a letter among the Greeks, is the name of a vegetable among the Latins."

== Distinctions ==
Letters, pictograms (used by American Indians, Eskimos, African Bushmen, and Oceanians), conventional signs (such as totemic signs, taboos, and magic signs), ideograms (like those used by the Mayas, ancient Egyptians, Mesopotamians, and Chinese), and syllabic scripts (such as Brahmi and Phoenician scripts) are all forms of written communication. "The general term 'letter' is used to designate each graphic element of which an alphabet is made up and which are used in alphabetic scripts." Letters, therefore, only concern alphabetical writing (Greek and Roman alphabets, the Ogamic script used by the Irish and Welsh in the 5th century, the Runic script of the Germans, the Glagolitic alphabet of the Slavs in the 9th century, Hebrew in the 2nd century BC, and Arabic scripts from the 10th century BC, etc.).

Some letters are conventional, others are directly symbolic. For example, the "o" symbolizes the mouth.

Conventional letter	Symbolic letter
o = letter o, o-sound, oxygen, etc.	o = mouth, alum (a shiny sulfate), etc.

Symbol, symbolism and symbology. Symbolic and symbolism are interconnected concepts. 1) "The symbol is a concrete sign evoking by a natural relationship something absent or impossible to perceive" (André Lalande, Technical and Critical Vocabulary of Philosophy). 2) Letter symbolism encompasses the ability of letters to signify, influence, or activate, as well as their interpretive potential. 3) Symbolic concerns the signifying system of letters: on the one hand, they together form a system, a whole, a set, a complex; on the other, each one enters into a network (each one calls its opposite, its nearer, etc.).

Semiotics: syntax, semantics, pragmatics. The semiotic approach, since Charles W. Morris, has examined three perspectives to analyze to letters: 1) syntax (the relationship between letters), 2) semantics (the meaning of letters, what they indirectly designate, by natural analogy) [either the signifier/signified relationship, or the sign/referent relationship], 3) pragmatics (the use of symbolic letters in communication).

Sound, figure, name: The philosopher Ramus (Gramere, 1562, p. 24), impressed by the inventions of printing, distinguishes three aspects in letters: sound, figure, and name. For example, the printing character V refers to a sound (pronounced "Vi"), a figure (written V, v), and a name (V is called "Vee", in Ramus's time: "Vau").

== Analogies and correspondences ==
=== Synesthesia ===
To understand the symbolism of letters, it may be beneficial to explore how humans have associated letters with other elements in similar domains (such as geometric figures, sounds, colors, etc.). Additionally, examining how certain synesthesias operate (connections between sensations like form and color, sound and color, etc.) can provide insight into the symbolic nature of letters.

Greek magical texts sometimes say that the seven vowels symbolize the seven planetary gods. According to Plutarch, A is linked to the Moon, to the note B, to Monday; E: Mercury, C; H: Venus, D; I: Sun, E; O: Mars, F; Y: Jupiter, G; omega: Saturn, A.

In Dogme et Rituel de Haute Magie (1854, English: "Dogma and Ritual of High Magic"), Éliphas Lévi was the first to establish correspondences between the letters of the Hebrew alphabet, the 22 paths to wisdom according to the Kabbalists' Sefer Yezira, and the 22 Tarot cards.

A grapheme → color synesthete testifies: "I often associate letters and numbers with colors. Every number and letter is associated with a color in my head. Sometimes, when letters are written on a piece of paper, they will appear briefly in color if I am not concentrating on them. For example, "S" is red, "H" is orange, "C" is yellow, "J" is yellow-green, "G" is green; "E" is blue, "X" is purple, "I" is pale yellow, "2" is brown, "1" is white. If I write SHCJGEX or ABCPDEF, these letters will form a rainbow as I read them."

=== Decoding techniques ===
There are two levels to the art of deciphering (identifying and interpreting) symbols and their code: deciphering requires knowledge of the code, while deciphering does not. More decoding techniques are available.

The first technique is shape symbolism. Geofroy Tory (Champ fleuri de la vraie proportion des lettres antiques, 1500) believed that letters, created through divine inspiration, were constructed using straight lines and circles. "Look at the shapes of letters. They are made up of straight lines and curves. In traditional symbolism, the straight line is linked to masculine polarity and the curve to feminine polarity. This ‘sexual’ particularity of letters and numbers is not accidental for those who know that everything couples according to laws and codes that make chance a decoy. Complementary polarities enable productive ‘self-fertilization.’

1. The horizontal line represents our terrestrial plane, which is 'flat' and appears stable. It is a structure that accommodates our matter and serves as a symbol for it. Additionally, it is commonly associated with the masculine symbol.
2. The vertical line represents the Divine Spirit. It is a descent from "what is above," linking the superior and the inferior. That which is upright, in the image of the human, is that which is endowed with spirit, with intelligence, being the link between the divine world and the lower worlds. Look at the symbolism of the tree, the vertical pillar that is traditionally revered as the link between heaven and earth.
3. The diagonal line designates a movement, which is a progression or an ascent depending on the direction of the line. This movement can be a temporal movement or a capacity for action or doing.
4. The half-sphere: matrix. It symbolizes femininity awaiting fertilization.
5. The half-square symbolixes humanity in their incomplete polarity. The square seen is their Cartesian side, "square", and yet truncated by half because his other half is missing.
6. The circle represents a finite whole, complete and perfect, autonomous, yet surrounded by its limit. It contains its own space, a container and a content.”

The second technique is the repertoire. First, identify the objects bearing a given letter and beginning with a given letter; and second, find out what they have in common.

The third technique is the system. Examine the relationships with other letters. To which letter is the A in a given word opposed, coupled, or similar?

The fourth technique is the science. What do traditions (proverbs, myths, tales, etc) and scholars (philosophers, theologians, iconographers, historians, etc.) have to say?

The fifth technique involves esoteric procedures, that are part of the Kabbalah and constitute the "science of letters," or the "combination of letters" (hôkhmat ha-zeruf), which was particularly developed by Abraham Aboulafia at the end of the 13th century. In this system, "every letter is a name in itself" (Eleazar of Worms). Reuchlin defines Kabbalah as "a symbolic theology in which letters and names are not only the signs of things but also the reality of things.” The Kabbalistic combination of letters involves three processes:

1. - gematria (numerology). Ever since the Babylonian exile, some mystics have explained a word or group of words by the numerical value of its letters, and by comparison with another word of the same value. Alef = 1, dalet = 4, etc. According to Gikatella (14th century), the word Echad, "One", is equivalent to the word Ahabah, "Love": 1 + 8 + 4 = 13, and 1 + 5 + 2 + 5 = 13. "The gematria of the word Emet (truth) is 441, or 4 + 4 + 1 = 9, which is the same as that of Lev (I or God or love) (= 36 = 3 + 6 = 9). Letter and number correspond, and are identified.
2. - notarikon (acrostic). This is another Kabbalah-related procedure. It consists in using the initial, intermediate, or final letters of a word or group of words as abbreviations of terms, expressions or statements, and, conversely, in forming a term, expression, or statement from the initial or final letters. Thus, Adam, formed from the Hebrew letters alef, dalet, and mem, refers to Adam, David, and Messiah (Messiah).
3. - temura (permutation). Each letter of a word or group of words is "replaced" by another letter, based on a substitution system. The most well-known system is atbash, which reverses the order so that the last letter becomes the first: taw = alef; thus, the name "Sheshak" in Jeremiah (XXV, 26; LI, 41) could be decrypted as Bavel, 'Babylon.'" La Sainte Bible traduite en français sous la direction de l'école biblique de Jérusalem (1955) suggests that "'Sheshak': perhaps cryptographic writing for 'Babel.'" Another instance comes from the alchemist Michael Maier who writes the word Tusalmat, but through a code (discovered by Pierre Borel and Isaac Newton), in which t and s, u and a, l and r, m and n are interchanged to reveal Saturnus. This is merely a symbol as Tusalmat holds no inherent meaning or connection to Saturn (the alchemical lead).

== Types of letter symbolism ==
=== In esotericism ===
In Jewish mysticism history, the Sefer Yezira (Sepher Yetsirah, Book of Creation) is a highly enigmatic text, perhaps dating from the 2nd century, written in Babylon. According to this brief and enigmatic text, the world is made up of ten principles, called sefirot (numerations), which correspond to the ten numbers of the decimal system, from 1 to 10. These 10 sefirot are linked by 32 paths, namely the first 10 whole numbers and the 22 letters of the Hebrew alphabet, divided into 3 mother letters (alef, mem, shin), 7 double letters (consonants that produce a hard or soft sound depending on whether or not they include a dagesh: bet, gimel, dalet, kaf, pe, on the one hand; kaf, pe, resh, tav, on the other), and 12 single letters.

In thirty-two mysterious paths of Wisdom [the first 10 whole numbers + the 22 letters], Yah, Eternal of Hosts [Yod-VavYod], God of Israel, Living Elohim, Almighty God, High and Extolled, Dwelling in Eternity, Holy Be His Name, engraved and created His world in three Sefarim [books]: in writing, number and word. Ten Sefirot out of nothing [esprit, Air, Eau, Feu, Haut, Bas, Levant, Ponant, Midi, Nord, twenty-two foundation letters: three mothers [alef, mem, shin], seven doubles [bet, gimel, dalet; kaf, pe, resh, tav] and twelve simples [hê, vav, etc.]. Ten Sefirot out of nothing according to the number of the ten digits [fingers and toes], which are five against five and a single covenant to be determined in the center. In word and tongue and mouth [circumcision]… Three mothers: Alef, Mem, Shin: a great mystery, concealed, marvelous and magnificent whence emerge fire, wind and water… The nature of the heavens is fire, the nature of air is wind, the nature of earth is water. Fire ascends and water descends and wind balances between the two… Three mothers: Alef, Mem, Shin. In the breathing male and female: head and belly and body [...]

The most famous text challenging letter symbology is the Quran, in its second surah: "Alif, Lam, Meem. This is the Book in which there is no doubt, a guide for the righteous. Those who believe in the unseen…" Alif, Lam and Meem are three letters.

Swedenborg declared: "The language of celestial angels sounds very much in vowels U and O; and the language of spiritual angels in vowels E and I."

=== In magic ===
One important use of letter symbolism concerns magic. According to the pseudo-Paracelsus of the Archidoxis magica: "Signs, characters [occult writings and symbols], and letters have their force and efficacy. If the nature and proper essence of metals, the influence and power of the heavens and planets, and the meaning and disposition of characters, signs, and letters, harmonize and concur simultaneously with the observation of days, times, and hours, who then, in the name of heaven, would prevent a sign or seal [astrological image] made in this way from possessing its force and faculty of operation?"

In the 10th century, Ibn Wahshiya wrote a work widely read by magicians on eighty-seven magical alphabets: Connaissance longuement désirée des alphabets occultes enfin dévoilée.

From the thirteenth century onwards, magic books were filled with magical alphabets. Christian magicians relied on quotations from the Gospels to justify their beliefs, and to write their texts: "I am the Alpha and the Omega,” says the Lord God" (Revelation, 1, 8), "Before heaven and earth pass away, not an i [iota, in Greek], not a dot on the i will pass from the Law, until all is fulfilled" (Matthew, 5, 18), "I am the way and the truth and the life" (John, 14, 6): Via, Veritas, Vita, "In my name [Jesus] they will drive out demons; they will speak in new tongues" (Mark, 16, 17), "God raised him from the dead... This very Name [Yahweh, the sacred Tetragrammaton] has given strength" (Acts, 3, 16-16).

The secret alphabets of Abbot Trithemius (1462–1516), in Steganographia, are used as much for cryptography as for angelic magic.

John Dee, famous English mathematician, magician, and author of Monas Hieroglyphica (1564), stated:

This alphabetical literature contains great mysteries... The first mystical letters of the Hebrews, Greeks and Romans, formed by a single God, have been transmitted to mortals (...) in such a way that all the signs representing them are produced by points, straight lines, and perimeters of circumferences, arranged according to a marvelous and very skillful art.

Johann Michael Moscherosch (1601–1669) had one of his characters say: "When I wake up in the morning (...), I recite a whole alphabet; all the prayers of the world are included" (Wunderliche und Warhafftige Geschichte Philanders von Sittewald, 1642, p. 701).

Grimoires feature letters of the alphabet. To prevent hemorrhaging, the magician proposed this rite:

Write these characters on a blank parchment and tie them around the neck of the person losing blood: S.q.r.tz.Os. T.q.e.t.o.a.c.ge.E.h.x sancta. Sernenisa." (Le sachet accoucheur).

== See also ==
- English Qaballa
- Grammatology
- Graphology
- Ogham
