= Isopsephy =

Numerological connection between words whose letters' number values have equal sums

In numerology, isopsephy (stressed on the I and the E; from Greek ἴσος (ísos) 'equal' and ψῆφος (psêphos) 'count', lit. 'pebble') or isopsephism is the practice of adding up the number values of the letters in a word to form a single number. The total number is then used as a metaphorical bridge to other words evaluating the equal number, which satisfies isos or "equal" in the term. Ancient Greeks used counting boards for numerical calculation and accounting, with a counter generically called psephos ('pebble'), analogous to the Latin word calculus, from which the English calculate is derived.

Isopsephy is related to gematria: the same practice using the Hebrew alphabet. It is also related to the ancient number systems of many other peoples (for the Arabic alphabet version, see Abjad numerals). A gematria of Latin script languages was also popular in Europe from the Middle Ages to the Renaissance, and its legacy remains an influence in code-breaking and numerology.

== History ==
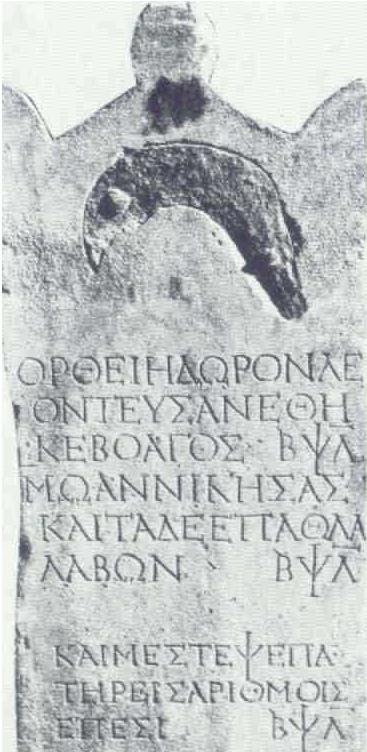
Example of isopsephy from the Sanctuary of Artemis Orthia, 2nd century AD

Until Arabic numerals were adopted and adapted from Indian numerals in the 8th and 9th centuries AD, and promoted in Europe by Fibonacci of Pisa with his 1202 book Liber Abaci, numerals were predominantly alphabetical. For instance in Ancient Greece, Greek numerals used the alphabet. It is just a short step from using letters of the alphabet in everyday arithmetic and mathematics to seeing numbers in words, and to writing with an awareness of the numerical dimension of words.

An early reference to isopsephy, albeit of more-than-usual sophistication (employing multiplication rather than addition), is from the mathematician Apollonius of Perga, writing in the 3rd century BC. He asks: "Given the verse: ΑΡΤΕΜΙΔΟΣ ΚΛΕΙΤΕ ΚΡΑΤΟΣ ΕΞΟΧΟΝ ΕΝΝΕΑ ΚΟΥΡΑΙ ('Nine maidens, praise the glorious power of Artemis'), what does the product of all its elements equal?"

More conventional are the instances of isopsephy found in graffiti at Pompeii, dating from around 79 AD. One reads Φιλω ης αριθμος ϕμε, "I love her whose number is 545." Another says "Amerimnus thought upon his lady Harmonia for good. The number of her honorable name is 45."

Suetonius, writing in 121 AD, reports a political slogan that someone wrote on a wall in Rome:

Nero, Orestes, Alcmeon their mothers slew.
A calculation new. Nero his mother slew

which appears to be another example. In Greek, Νερων, Nero, has the numerical value:

Ν {} ε {} ρ {} ω {} ν {} {}
50 + 5 + 100 + 800 + 50 = 1005,

the same value as:

{} ι {} δ {} ι {} α {} ν {} {} {} μ {} η {} τ {} ε {} ρ {} α {} {} {} α {} π {} ε {} κ {} τ {} ε {} ι {} ν {} ε {}
{} i {} d {} i {} a {} n {} {} {} m {} e {} t {} e {} r {} a {} {} {} a {} p {} e {} k {} t {} e {} i {} n {} e {}
( 10 + 4 + 10 + 1 + 50 ) + ( 40 + 8 + 300 + 5 + 100 + 1 ) + ( 1 + 80 + 5 + 20 + 300 + 5 + 10 + 50 + 5 )
"He killed his own mother".

A famous example is 666 in the Biblical Book of Revelation (13:18): "Here is wisdom. Let him that hath understanding count the number of the beast: for it is the number of a man; and his number is Six hundred threescore and six." The word rendered "count", ψηφισάτω, psephisato, has the same "pebble" root as the word isopsephy.

Also in the 1st century AD, Leonidas of Alexandria created isopsephs, epigrams with equinumeral distichs, where the first hexameter and pentameter equal the next two verses in numerical value. He addressed some of them to Nero:

Θυει σοι τοδε γραμμα γενεθλιακαισιν εν ὡραις,
Καισαρ, Νειλαιη Μουσα Λεωνιδεω.
Καλλιοπης γαρ ακαπνον αει θυος· εις δε νεωτα
Ην εθελῃς, θυσει τουδε περισσοτερα.

This translates to: "The muse of Leonidas of the Nile offers up to thee, O Caesar, this writing, at the time of thy nativity; for the sacrifice of Calliope is always without smoke: but in the ensuing year he will offer up, if thou wilt, better things than this." Here the sum of both the first and second distich is 5699. In another of his distichs, the hexameter line is equal in number to its corresponding pentameter:

Εἱς προς ἑνα ψηφοισιν ισαζεται, ου δυο δοιοις,
Ου γαρ ετι στεργω την δολιχογραφιην.

This translates to: "One line is made equal in number to one, not two to two; for I no longer approve of long epigrams." Here each line totals 4111.

A headstone found at the Temple of Artemis at Sparta Orthia is a 2nd-century AD example of isopsephic elegiac verse. It says:

ΟΡΘΕΙΗ ΔΩΡΟΝ ΛΕΟΝΤΕΥΣ ΑΝΕΘΗΚΕ ΒΟΑΓΟΣ ΒΨΛ
ΜΩΑΝ ΝΙΚΗΣΑΣ ΚΑΙ ΤΑΔΕ ΕΠΑΘΛΑ ΛΑΒΩΝ ΒΨΛ
ΚΑΙ ΜΕΣΤΕΨΕ ΠΑΤΗΡ ΕΙΣΑΡΙΘΜΟΙΣ ΕΠΕΣΙ ΒΨΛ

It is the votive stele for a boy who won a competition in singing. The words in each line add up to ΄Β΄Ψ΄Λ, that is 2730, and that total is also given at the end of each line. Also in the 2nd century AD, Aelius Nicon of Pergamon, the Greek architect and builder described by his son, the famous physician Galen, as having "mastered all there was to know of the science of geometry and numbers", was a master in composing isopsephic works.

== Letter values of the Greek alphabet ==
In Greek, each unit (1, 2, ..., 9) was assigned a separate letter, each tens (10, 20, ..., 90) a separate letter, and each hundreds (100, 200, ..., 900) a separate letter. This requires 27 letters, so the 24-letter alphabet was extended by using three obsolete letters: digamma ϝ (also used are stigma ϛ or, in modern Greek, στ) for 6, qoppa ϙ for 90, and sampi ϡ for 900.

This alphabetic system operates on the additive principle in which the numeric values of the letters are added together to form the total. For example, 241 is represented as σμα (200 + 40 + 1).

Letter (upper and lower case)	Value	Name	Trans- literation
Α α	1	Alpha	a
Β β	2	Beta	b
Γ γ	3	Gamma	g
Δ δ	4	Delta	d
Ε ε	5	Epsilon	e
(Ϝ ϝ / Ϛ ϛ)	6	Digamma (later Stigma)	w / st
Ζ ζ	7	Zeta	z
Η η	8	Eta	ē
Θ θ	9	Theta	th
Ι ι	10	Iota	i
Κ κ	20	Kappa	k
Λ λ	30	Lambda	l
Μ μ	40	Mu	m
Ν ν	50	Nu	n
Ξ ξ	60	Xi	x
Ο ο	70	Omicron	o
Π π	80	Pi	p
(Ϙ ϙ)	90	Koppa	q
Ρ ρ	100	Rho	r
Σ σ	200	Sigma	s
Τ τ	300	Tau	t
Υ υ	400	Upsilon	y
Φ φ	500	Phi	ph
Χ χ	600	Chi	ch
Ψ ψ	700	Psi	ps
Ω ω	800	Omega	ō
(Ϡ ϡ)	900	Sampi	ts

== See also ==
- About the Mystery of the Letters – 6th-century anonymous Christian treatise
- Chronogram – Inscription whereby specific letters stand for a date
- English Qaballa – English Qaballa system of James Lees
- Hermetic Qabalah – Western esoteric tradition
- Numerology – Mystical properties of numbers
- Marcosians – Gnostic sect founded by Marcus
- Sator Square – Roman-era word square with a Latin palindrome
- Theomatics – Numerological study of the Christian Bible
