= African University of Technology and Management =

African University of Technology and Management (UATM)
- Type: Private institution of professional training and research
- Established: 1992; 33 years ago
- Location: Cotonou, Benin; 6.38648°N 2.32265°E
- Campus: Gbégamey, Abomey-Calavi, Agla, Akpakpa, Porto-Novo
- Language: French, English

The African University of Technology and Management (UATM) is a private university established in 1992 in Benin. It is also known as UATM GASA-FORMATION-SUPELEC BENIN

== History ==
Founded in 1992, the African University of Technology and Management (UATM) was officially accredited on 1 February 2006 by a Ministerial Order.

== Programs ==
UATM offers programs in electronics and management information system and consists of 16 units.

== Distinctions ==
=== Gallery ===
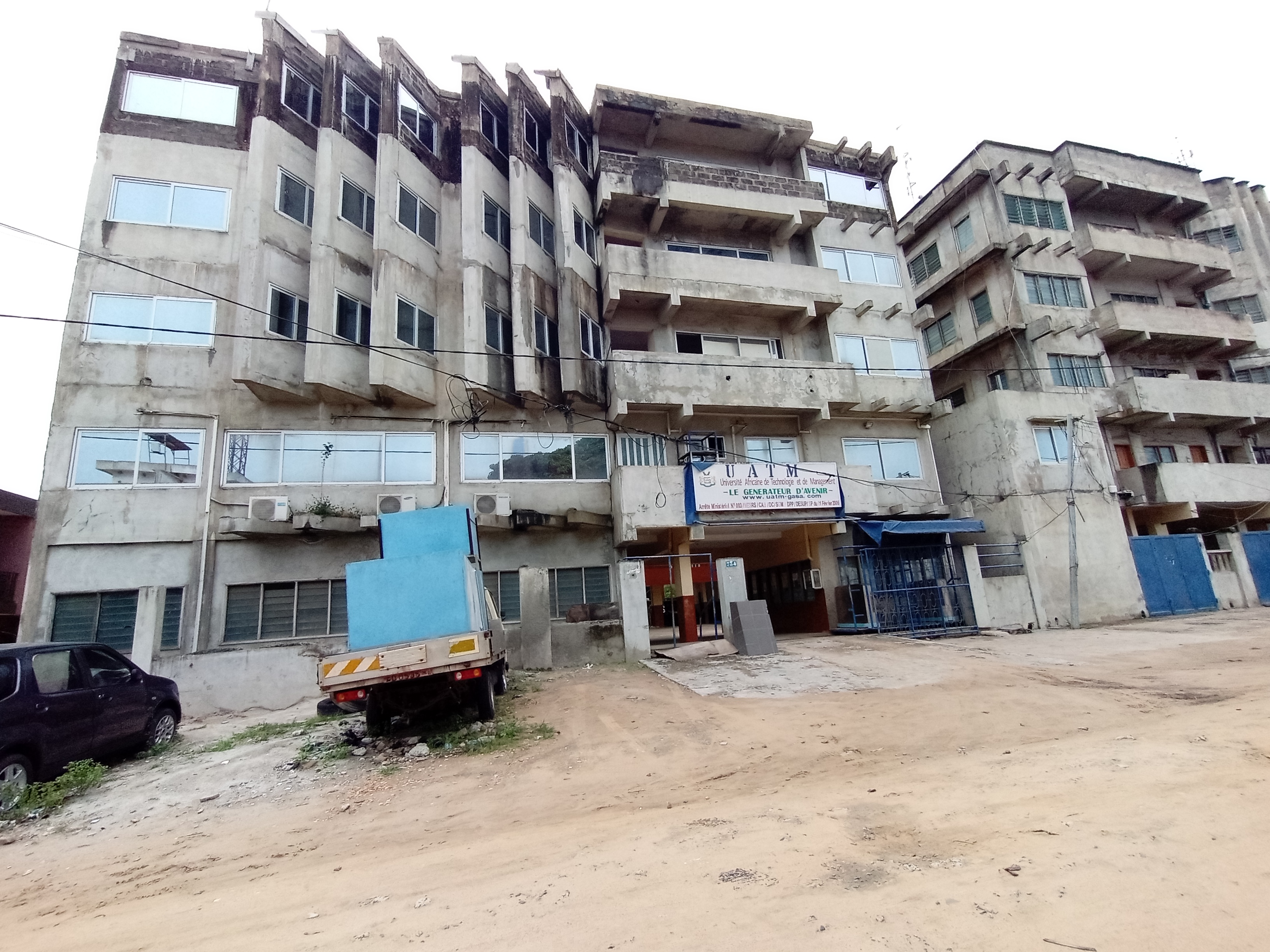
Building of the African University of Technology and Management

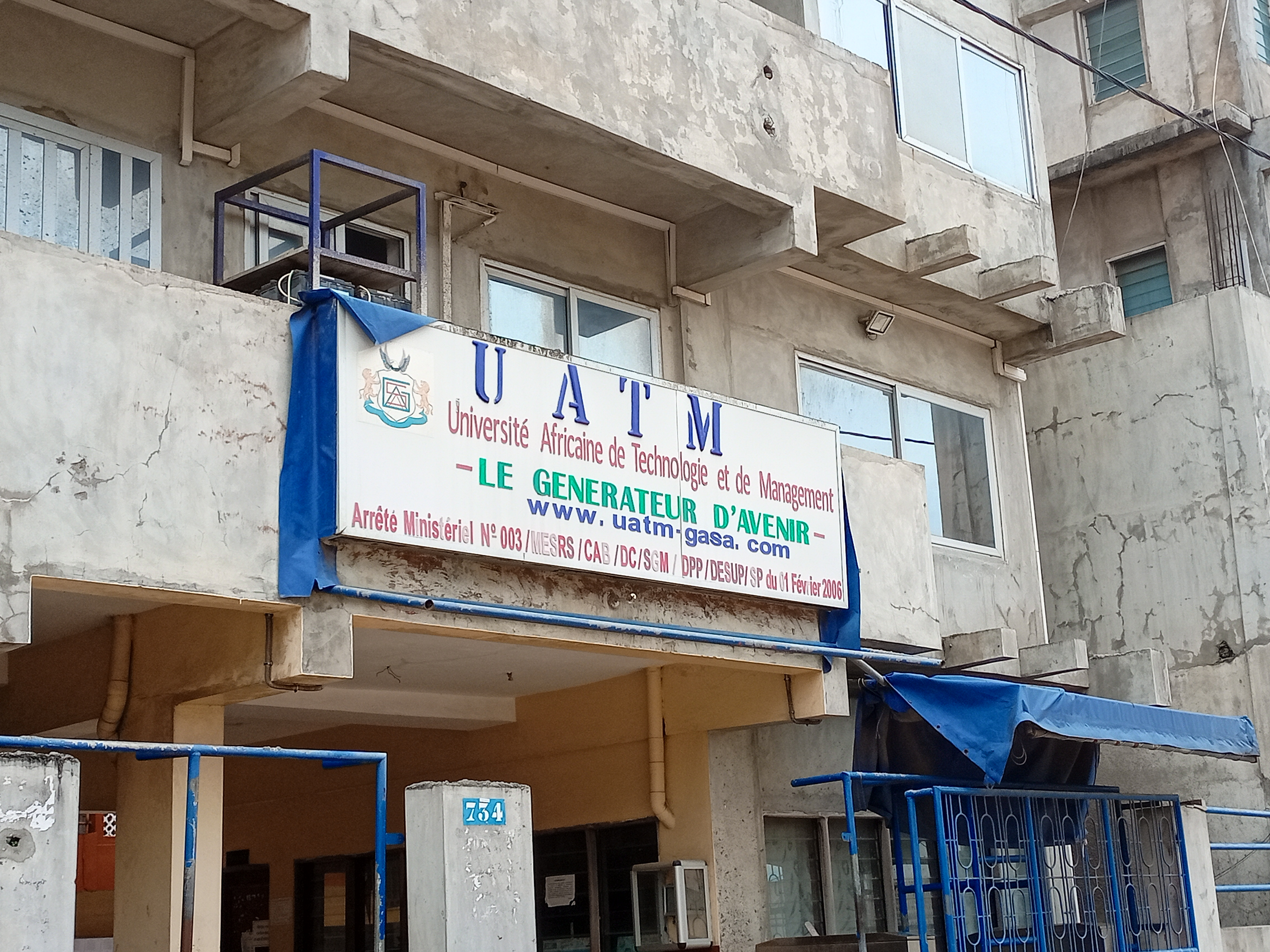
Main entrance of the African University of Technology and Management.
