= Significance of numbers in Judaism =

Various numbers play a significant role in Jewish texts or practice. Some such numbers were used as mnemonics to help remember concepts, while other numbers were considered to have intrinsic significance or allusive meaning.

The song Echad Mi Yodea ("who knows one?"), sung at the Passover Seder, is known for recounting a religious concept or practice associated with each of the first 13 numbers.

== In Jewish History ==
In Jewish historical study, numbers were believed to be a means for understanding the divine. This marriage between the symbolic and the physical found its pinnacle in the creation of the Tabernacle. The numerical dimensions of the temple are a "microcosm of creation ... that God used to create the Olamot-Universes."

In the thought system of Maharal, each number has a consistent philosophical meaning:

1. unity.
2. dualism and multiplicity.
3. the unity between two extremes.
4. multiplicity in two directions, like the cardinal directions.
5. the center point which unifies those four extremes.
6. multiplicity in three dimensions.
7. the center point which unifies all of nature, as with Shabbat.
8. the supernatural realm which feeds nature, and the striving of man for a connection with the supernatural.
9. the most complete multiplicity, including division between the natural and supernatural.
10. the final unification between natural and supernatural.

== 1 ==
Echad Mi Yodea begins with the line "One is Hashem, in the heavens and the earth - אחד אלוהינו שבשמיים ובארץ." The monotheistic nature of normative Judaism, referenced also as the "oneness of God," is a common theme in Jewish liturgy—such as the central prayer—as well as Rabbinic literature. Maimonides writes in the 13 Principles of Faith that

God, the Cause of all, is one. This does not mean one as in one of a pair, nor one like a species (which encompasses many individuals), nor one as in an object that is made up of many elements, nor as a single simple object that is infinitely divisible. Rather, God is a unity, unlike any other possible unity.

== 2 ==
Two "defines the concept of evenness," and can represent God's relationship with humanity or the people Israel. It is also linked to the two tablets of the covenant (such as in Echad Mi Yodea) and the two inclinations; the yetzer hara and yetzer hatov.

On Shabbat, it's traditional to light two candles; one to represent keeping (שמור) the Sabbath, and the other to represent remembering (זכור) it. There are several common re-interpretations of this custom. The two candles may also represent husband and wife, the second soul received on Shabbat, or the division between light and dark in the creation story.

== 3 ==
- Three are the Fathers (Patriarchs) - שלושה אבות (Abraham, Isaac and Jacob)
- The three sons of Noah (Ham, Shem and Japheth)
- Number of aliyot on a non-Yom Tov Monday and Thursday Torah reading and number of aliyot in Shabbat Mincha
- The Holy of Holies occupied one-third of the area of the Temple (and previously, Tabernacle)
- The angels declared that God was "Holy, holy, holy" for a total of three times
- The Priestly Blessing contains three sections
- On the third day the Jewish people received the Torah

== 4 ==
- Four are the Mothers (Matriarchs) - ארבע אימהות (Sarah, Rebecca, Rachel, and Leah)
- The number of aliyot on Rosh Chodesh
- At the Passover Seder four cups of wine are drunk, and four expressions of redemption are recited
- Both the heavens and earth were described as having four sides or corners, similar to the cardinal directions.
- During the Passover Seder, the youngest child asks the famous Four Questions about the Exodus. Also during the Passover Seder, there are four sons who demand different answers.

== 5 ==
- Five are the books of the Torah - חמישה חומשי תורה
- Of the Ten Commandments, five commandments were written on each of the two tablets as believed by Rabbi Hanina ben Gamaliel. Although the Sages believe each tablet had all 10 commandments on them
- The sections of the book of Psalms
- The number of knots in the tzitzit
- Number of aliyot on Yom Tov that does not coincide with Shabbat
- Five species of grain

== 6 ==
- Six are the books of the Mishnah - שישה סידרי משנה
- The six working days of the week
- The six days of Creation

== 7 ==
- Number of days in the weekly cycle including counting of the Sabbath - שיבעה ימי שבתא
- According to a midrash, "All sevens are beloved": There are seven terms for the heavens and seven terms for the earth; Enoch was the seventh generation from Adam; Moses was the seventh generation from Abraham; David was the seventh son in his family; Asa (who called out to God) was the seventh generation of Israelite kings; the seventh day (Shabbat), month (Tishrei), year (shmita) and shmita (jubilee) all have special religious status.
- The Seven Laws of Noah
- The Seven Species of the Land of Israel
- The counting of the Omer consists of seven weeks, each of seven days
- Number of blessings in the Sheva Brachot
- The red heifer passage discusses seven items of purification, each mentioned seven times.
- A woman in niddah following menstruation must count seven "clean days" prior to immersion in the mikvah
- Acts of atonement and purification were accompanied by a sevenfold sprinkling
- The menorah in the Temple had seven lamps
- The shiva mourning period is seven days
- Number of days of Sukkot and Pesach (Israel)
- Number of blessings in the Amidah of Shabbat, Yom Tov, and all Musaf prayers (except Rosh Hashanah)
- Number of aliyot on Shabbat
- There were seven of every pure animal in Noah's Ark
- The number seven is said to symbolize completion, association with God, or the covenant of holiness and sanctification
- Moses died on the seventh of Adar
- Jacob bowed to Esau seven times upon meeting him (Genesis, 33:3)

== 8 ==
- Eight are the days of the circumcision - שמונה ימי מילה
- Total number of days of Yom Tov in a year in Israel
- Number of days of Chanukah
- 8 days of sukkos
- Number of days of Pesach (Diaspora)
- According to the Zohar, the number eight signifies new beginnings because the eighth day was the first day after creation when God returned to work; the week began again.

== 9 ==
- The first nine days of the Hebrew month of Av are collectively known as "The Nine Days" (Tisha HaYamim), and are a period of semi-mourning leading up to Tisha B'Av, the ninth day of Av on which both Temples in Jerusalem were destroyed

== 10 ==
- The Ten Commandments - עשרה דיבריא
- The ten Plagues of Egypt
- Ten Jewish people form a minyan
- There are ten Sefirot (human and Godly characteristics) depicted in Kabbalah
- According to the Mishna, the world was created by ten divine utterances; ten generations passed between Adam and Noah and between Noah and Abraham; Abraham received ten trials from God; the Israelites received ten trials in the desert; there were ten plagues in Egypt; ten miracles occurred in the Temple; ten apparently supernatural phenomena were created during twilight in the sixth day of creation. The number ten in this Mishna indicates a large number (e.g. the Mishna declares that Abraham's willingness to undergo ten trials "indicates his love for God").
- Yud is the tenth letter in the Hebrew alefbet that links unity (Yeḥudi) with God (Yhwh) and the Jew (Yehudi).

== 11 ==
- Eleven are the stars of the Joseph's dream - אחד עשר כוכביא
- There are eleven spices in the Incense offering

== 12 ==
- Twelve are the tribes of Israel - שנים עשר שיבטיא
- Ritual items frequently came in twelves to represent the role of each tribe. The high priest's breastplate (hoshen) had twelve precious stones embedded within them, representing the 12 tribes. Elijah built his altar with 12 stones to represent the tribes, Moses built 12 pillars at Sinai representing the tribes, and Joshua erected twelve memorial stones at the Jordan River representing the tribes.
- "All of God's creations are equal in number to the 12 tribes: 12 astrological signs, 12 months, 12 hours of the day, 12 hours of the night, 12 stones that Aaron [the high priest] would wear."
- The Temple Mount could be accessed through twelve gates
- Age of Bat Mitzvah, when a Jewish female becomes obligated to follow Jewish law
- There were twelve loaves of show-bread on the shulchan (table) in the Beit Hamikdash
- Sons of Jacob
- Number of springs of water Elim

== 13 ==
- Thirteen are the attributes of Hashem - שלושה עשר מידיא
- Age of Bar Mitzvah, when a Jewish male becomes obligated to follow Jewish law
- Jewish principles of faith according to Maimonides
- Hermeneutic rules of Rabbi Ishmael
- Number of days of Yom Tov in a year (Diaspora)
- Months in a leap year on the Hebrew calendar

== 14 ==
- The number of books in the Mishnah Torah, also entitled Yad Hahazaka in which the word Yad has gematria 14

== 15 ==
- The number of steps in the Passover Seder
- One of two numbers that is written differently from the conventions of writing numbers in Hebrew in order to avoid writing the name of God. The other is 16.
- The number of words in the Priestly Blessing
- The date of many Jewish Holidays, including: Pesach, Sukkot, Tu B'Shevat, and Tu B'Av
- The number of chapters in Psalms that begin with the words Shir Hama'alos

== 16 ==
- One of two numbers that is written differently from the conventions of writing numbers in Hebrew in order to avoid writing the name of God. The other is 15.

== 18 ==
- Gematria of "chai", the Hebrew word for life. Multiples of this number are considered good luck and are often used in gift giving.
- The Amidah is also known as "Shemoneh Esreh" ("Eighteen"), due to originally having 18 blessings, though a 19th blessing was later added

== 19 ==
- The number of years in a cycle of the Hebrew calendar, after which the date on the lunar calendar matches the date on the solar calendar
- Blessings in the weekday Amidah

== 20 ==
- Minimum age to join the Israelite army
- In halakhah, the death penalty was only carried out if the offender was at least 20 years old

== 22 ==
- The number of letters in the Hebrew alphabet
- The number of the almond blossoms on the menorah

== 24 ==
- Total number of books in the Tanakh
- Twenty-four priestly gifts
- 24 priestly divisions
- 24 questions that Reish Lakish would ask Rabbi Yochanan
- 24 blessings recited in the Amidah on fast days
- 24,000 people that died in the plague that Pinchas stopped
- 24,000 students of Rabbi Akiva that died

== 26 ==
- Gematria of the Tetragrammaton

== 28 ==
- The number of Hebrew letters in Genesis 1:1

== 30 ==
- The number of days in some months of the Hebrew calendar

== 33 ==
- The 33rd day of the Omer, on which Lag BaOmer falls

== 36 ==
- The world is said to be sustained by the merit of 36 hidden righteous individuals. And it is the double of 18 - See above

== 40 ==
- Moses stayed on mount Sinai for 40 days after the giving of Torah. After the golden calf, he spend there another 40 days (and nights)
- The number of days the spies were in the land of Canaan
- Years in the desert—a generation
- Just as Mozes, the reign of king David and Solomon was also 40 years
- Days and nights of rain during the flood that occurred at the time of Noah
- Isaac's age at marriage to Rebecca
- Esau's age at marriage to his first two wives
- Number of days Jonah prophesies will pass before Nineveh is destroyed. (They repent)
- A mikveh must contain at least 40 se'ah (volume measurement) of water
- Number of years of the reign of David, Solomon, and the most righteous judges in the book of Judges
- Number of lashes for one who transgresses a commandment
- Number of days which the Torah was given
- Number of weeks a person is formed in their mother's womb
- Number of curses on Adam
- Minimum age at which a man could join the Sanhedrin

== 42 ==
- Letters in one of God's Divine Names
- 42 cities that refugees (See Cities of Refuge) can go to when they kill accidentally
- There were 42 journeys of the sons of Israel through the desert
- 42 Juveniles mauled by 2 she bears at Bethel after identifying prophet Elisha as 'Baldy' (head uncovered)

== 50 ==
- The 50th year of the sabbatical cycle was the Jubilee year

== 54 ==
- The Torah is divided into 54 weekly Torah portions

== 60 ==
- Considered the beginning of old age (Rashi, Leviticus 27:7)

== 70 ==
- The 70 nations of the world (Generations of Noah)
- Members of the Sanhedrin
- Lifespan of King David
- Years between the destruction of the first and construction of the Second Temple
- Number of date-palms at Elim
- Number of members of Jacob's family who descended to Egypt
- Number of the Jewish elders led by Moshe

== 86 ==
- The gematria of Elohim (אלהים)

== 130 ==
- The age of Jochebed when she gave birth to Moses.
- The 130 shekels of silver was offered during the dedication of the altar.

== 137 ==
- The number of years Ishmael, Levi and Amram (the father of Mozes) lived.

See Gen. 25:17, Ex. 6:16 and 6:20.

- It is the gematria of the word קבלה / Kabbalah.
- [See also the book: "137: Jung, Pauli, and the Pursuit of a Scientific Obsession".]

== 176 ==
- The amount of verses in Psalm 119, the longest Psalm in the entire Tanakh.
- The amount of verses found in Parashat Naso, the longest of the weekly Torah portions.
- The number of pages in the Gemara of Bava Batra, the most of any tractate in the Babylonian Talmud.

== 248 ==
- Number of positive commandments
- Number of limbs (איברים) in man's body
- Number of words in the three paragraphs of the Shema (שמע)

== 314 ==
- The gematria of Shaddai, one of God's names

== 318 ==
- Number of men Abraham took to battle against the 4 kings (Genesis 14:14); also gematria of Eliezer (Abraham's servant)

== 365 ==
- Length of the solar calendar (which has significance in Judaism)
- Number of prohibitive commandments
- Number of arteries in the body

== 374 ==
- Total number of years the First Temple stood

== 400 ==
- The amount of shekalim Abraham paid Ephron (Bereishit 23:15)
- The amount of men with Esav
- Years in Egypt

== 613 ==
- The 613 commandments, the number of mitzvot in the Torah

== 620 ==
- The total number of mitzvot, including those of Torah and Rabbinic origin.

== 600,000 ==
- The number of Jewish men of military age that were present at mount Sinai when the giving of the Torah happened.
- The number of Jewish men needed for the blessing of "Chacham HaRazim".

== See also ==
- Bible code, a purported set of secret messages encoded within the Torah.
- Biblical and Talmudic units of measurement
- Chronology of the Bible
- Gematria
- Hebrew calendar
- Hebrew numerals
- Jewish symbolism
- Notarikon, a method of deriving a word by using each of its initial letters.
