= Theomatics =

Numerological study of the Christian Bible

Theomatics is a numerological study of the Hebrew/Aramaic and Greek text of the Christian Bible (see also Biblical numerology), based upon gematria and isopsephia, by which its proponents claim to show the direct intervention of God in the writing of Christian scripture.

== Etymology ==
The term "theomatics" was coined by Del Washburn in 1976 as a combination of "Θεός" ("God") and "mathematics". Washburn wrote three books about theomatics and created a website espousing the hypothesis.

== Controversy ==
An analysis and criticism of theomatics has been published by Tim Hayes, previously under the pseudonym "A. B. Leever".

A German statistician, Kurt Fettelschoss, published an analysis that claims that "The observed quantity of theomatic hits is significantly not random". A response to the findings was posted by Tim Hayes. A further statistical analysis in defense, of Mr. Hayes response, was provided by Mr. Fettelschoss.

An analysis by Russell Glasser, entitled "Theomatics Debunked", shows the same phenomenon in a secular text.

Washburn's website has a page entitled "Scientific Proof" which discusses and responds to potential arguments against theomatics.
