= AGLA =

Magic word

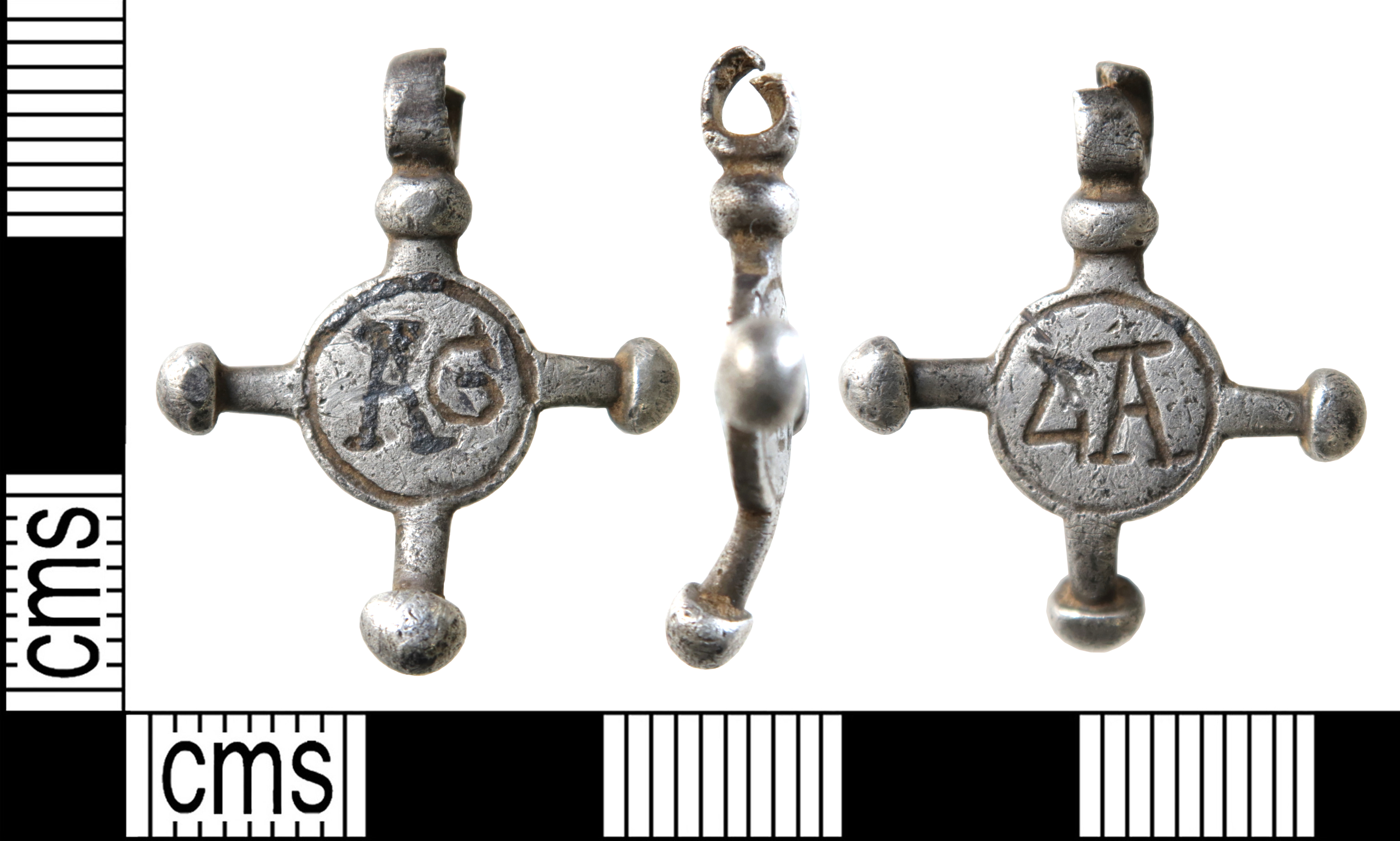
A medieval silver cross pendant inscribed with the letters AG LA

AGLA (אגלא) is a magic word that appears in some charms. Its meaning is unsettled, but is widely reputed to be a noṭariqōn or kabbalistic acronym for Hebrew: אַתָּה גִּבּוֹר לְעוֹלָם אֲדֹנָי, romanized: ʾAtā gībōr ləʿōlām ʾĂḏōnāy, "Thou, O Lord, art mighty forever", a phrase from Gevurot, the second blessing of the Amidah, the central Jewish prayer. However, according to Katelyn Mesler, "after much searching, I have yet to find evidence of such an interpretation prior to the late fourteenth or fifteenth century, a couple centuries after AGLA begins appearing in magical writings."

AGLA is found in at least 31 runic inscriptions. During the Middle Ages, the word was reinterpreted in the Kingdom of Germany as an initialism for Allmächtiger Gott, Lösche Aus, "Almighty God, extinguish the conflagration" and used as a talisman against fire. It has been inscribed on several medieval Christian silver crosses from England recorded by the Portable Antiquities Scheme, where it was interpreted as a charm against fever.
