= English Qaballa =

English Qaballa system of James Lees

English Qaballa (EQ) is a Hermetic Qabalah, based on a system of arithmancy that interprets the letters of the English alphabet via an assigned set of values. It was created by James Lees in 1976, through his efforts to understand, interpret, and elaborate on Aleister Crowley's The Book of the Law.

This system has also been referred to as the ALW cipher and the New Aeon English Qabalah (NAEQ) by other writers.

== Background ==
In 1904, Aleister Crowley wrote out in English the text of the foundational document of his world-view, known as Liber AL vel Legis, The Book of the Law. In this text was the injunction found at verse 2:55; "Thou shalt obtain the order & value of the English Alphabet, thou shalt find new symbols to attribute them unto" which was understood by Crowley as referring to an English Qabalah yet to be developed or revealed.

== Order and value ==
The "order & value" proposed by James Lees lays the letters out on the grid superimposed on the page of manuscript of Liber AL on which this verse (Ch. III, v. 47) appears (sheet 16 of Chapter III). Also appearing on this page are a diagonal line and a circled cross. The Book of the Law states that the book should only be printed with Crowley's hand-written version included, causing Crowley to surmise that there were mysteries in the "chance shape of the letters and their position to one another" of his own handwriting. As there are ten squares per column, this method is equivalent to taking every eleventh letter of the alphabet as the order and then assigning them sequential values:

A=1  L=2  W=3  H=4  S=5  D=6  O=7  Z=8  K=9  V=10 G=11 R=12 C=13
N=14 Y=15 J=16 U=17 F=18 Q=19 B=20 M=21 X=22 I=23 T=24 E=25 P=26

The number values can also be determined by arranging the letters of the alphabet in a circle, and starting with 'A' as 1, and counting around the circle in a clockwise fashion eleven letters to determine the next number values. Thus, with A=1, eleven letters on from A is the letter L which is assigned the value of 2. Then continuing clockwise all letters are assigned a number value until the letter A is reached. It is appreciated that a different set of values is achieved in a counter-clockwise direction.

== Methods ==
English Qaballa comprises the following methods:

- Calculation and comparison: The first method of English Qaballa is simple arithmancy with a numerical dictionary. The value of the word, phrase, or sentence is calculated and the resulting value is looked up in a numerical dictionary, an example of which may be found in an appendix of Thompson (2016). For example, the value of the word 'Jesus' is 68; other words with this value are 'life' and 'change'. The meaning of these 'word collisions' must be determined by the individual Qaballist.
- Initial and final letters: The second method is to calculate the value of the first letters of a phrase or sentence, and also the value of the last letters of the phrase. As with the first method, the resulting values are then looked up and utilized in the same manner. This analysis is intended to indicate how a process indicated by the phrase will begin and how it will end.
- "Reversal yields the reward": The third method is reversing the digits in the value of a word. This method is based on Liber AL III:1 "Abrahadabra! The reward of Ra Hoor Khut." In this example, 'Ra Hoor Khut' sums to 97, and 'Abrahadabra' sums to 79. Thus the verse provides its own example of how the reward may be calculated.
- "Counting well": The method of 'counting well' involves two words and is represented by the symbol '%'. To 'count well' the value of two words is to multiply the value of the first word by the number of letters in the second word and vice versa, then sum the two values thus obtained. Thus 'Jesus % Christ' yields (68 x 6) + (81 x 5) = 408 + 405 = 813. As with the first method, the resulting value is then looked up and interpreted in a similar manner.

An additional method involves summing the word progressively (e.g. 'word' yields 'w' = 3, 'wo' = 10, 'wor' = 22, and 'word' = 28). These successive values are then interpreted as a sequence which may elucidate the meaning of the word. A further method is to divide word into two or more parts, then sum each part separately, again producing a sequence of numbers to be interpreted. Yet another method is to replace a word with other words of the same value in a sentence or verse in order to clarify the meaning of the word in that specific context.

== History ==
=== Creation ===
The first use of the term English Qaballa (EQ) was in a 1979 editorial by Ray Sherwin in an editorial in the final issue of his journal, The New Equinox. Sherwin wrote that the "order & value of the English Alphabet" had been described by an English magician, James Lees, in November 1976. Lees subsequently assumed the role of publisher of The New Equinox and, starting in 1981, published additional material about his gematria system over the course of five issues of the journal, finishing in 1982. The first software designed to perform textual analysis of Liber AL and the other Holy Books of Thelema was written in 1984–5 by Trevor Langford. Langford subsequently worked with Jake Stratton-Kent on The Equinox: British Journal of Thelema, in which further original material on EQ was summarized by Stratton-Kent in the March 1988 issue.

Early on, Jim Lees also proposed a solution to Crowley's Liber AL. In the original handwritten text, the string of letters and numbers in the 76th verse of the second chapter is divided into two lines, the first ending with "Y" and the second beginning with "X". Jake Stratton-Kent thought that in the manuscript the 'X' at the beginning of line two looked like a multiplication symbol, so he added each line's values together and multiplied them; 17x11=187, the numerical value of the phrase "English alphabet", which he felt confirmed the correctness of the system.

4 6 3 8 A B K 2 4 A L G M O R 3 Y X 24 89 R P S T O V A L. What meaneth this, o prophet? Thou knowest not; nor shalt thou know ever. There cometh one to follow thee: he shall expound it. But remember, o chosen one, to be me; to follow the love of Nu in the star-lit heaven; to look forth upon men, to tell them this glad word.

In 1988, Stratton-Kent described his solution. He wrote:

When I first had my attention drawn to the existence of a purported English Qabala, my first reaction as a qabalist was to use it on this meaningless string of digits and characters. I converted all the letters into their numerical equivalents in the E.Q., and added them to the numbers in the series.

In the original handwritten text, the string of letters and numbers is divided into two lines, the first ending with "Y" and the second beginning with "X". Stratton-Kent says,

There are seventeen numbers and letters in the first line and eleven in the second ... but in the manuscript the 'X' at the beginning of line two looks like a multiplication symbol, so I made this calculation; 17x11=187, the numerical value of the phrase ENGLISH ALPHABET.

== See also ==
- Ceremonial magic – Variety of rituals of magic
- Letter symbolism – Symbolic meaning and value of letters
- Magical formula – Words expressing a process in ceremonial magic
- Magical organization – Organization for the practice of occult magic
