= Aleister Crowley =

English occultist (1875–1947)

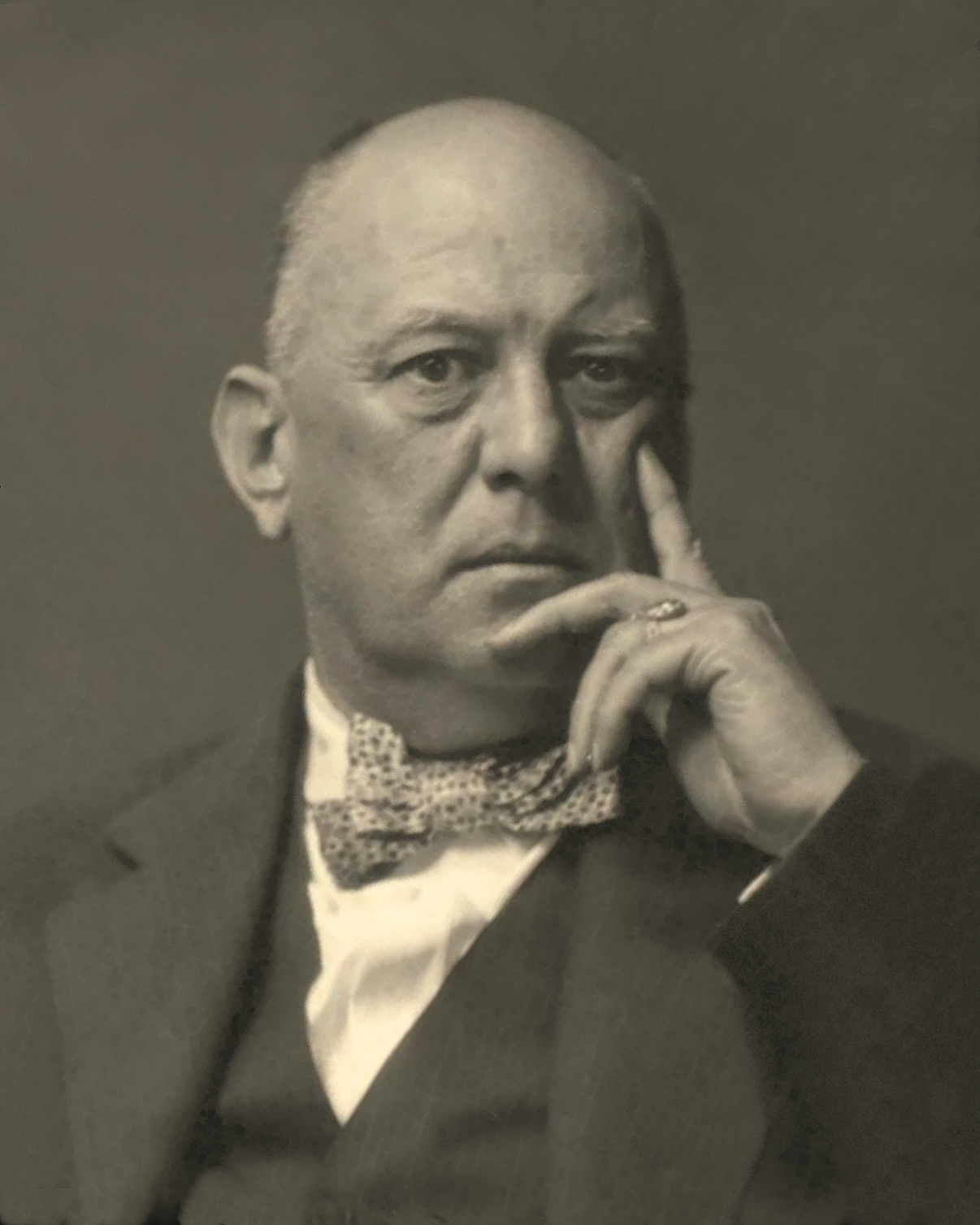
- Crowley in 1925
- Born: Edward Alexander Crowley; 12 October 1875; Leamington Spa, Warwickshire, England
- Died: 1 December 1947 (aged 72); Hastings, Sussex, England
- Resting place: Ashes buried in Hampton, New Jersey
- Education: Trinity College, Cambridge
- Occupations: Occultist; poet; novelist; mountaineer
- Spouses: Rose Edith Kelly (m. 1903; div. 1909) Maria Teresa Sanchez (m. 1929)
- Children: 5, including Randall Gair Doherty

Aleister Crowley (/ˈælɪstər ˈkroʊli/; born Edward Alexander Crowley; 12 October 1875 – 1 December 1947) was an English occultist, ceremonial magician, poet, novelist, mountaineer, and painter. As the founder of the religion of Thelema in the early 20th century, he identified as its prophet, entrusted with guiding humanity into the Æon of Horus. A prolific writer, he published widely—composing the "Libri" of Thelema—over the course of his life.

Born to a wealthy family in Royal Leamington Spa, Warwickshire, Crowley rejected his parents' Plymouth Brethren faith to pursue an interest in Western esotericism. He was educated at Trinity College at the University of Cambridge, where he focused his attention upon mountaineering and poetry, resulting in several publications. Some biographers allege that here he was recruited into a British intelligence agency, further suggesting that he remained a spy throughout his life. In 1898, he joined the esoteric Hermetic Order of the Golden Dawn, where he was trained in ceremonial magic by Samuel Liddell MacGregor Mathers and Allan Bennett. He went mountaineering in Mexico with Oscar Eckenstein, before studying Hindu and Buddhist practices in India. In 1904, he married Rose Edith Kelly, and they honeymooned in Cairo, Egypt, where Crowley wrote down The Book of the Law—a sacred text that serves as the basis for Thelema, which he said had been dictated to him by a supernatural entity named Aiwass. The Book announced the start of the Æon of Horus and declared that its followers should "Do what thou wilt": seek to align themselves with their True Will via the practice of ceremonial magic.

After the unsuccessful 1905 Kanchenjunga expedition and a visit to India and China, Crowley returned to the United Kingdom, where he attracted attention as a prolific author of poetry, novels, and occult literature. In 1907, he and George Cecil Jones co-founded an esoteric order—the A∴A∴, through which they propagated Thelema. After spending time in Algeria, in 1912 he was initiated into another esoteric order, the German-based Ordo Templi Orientis (O.T.O.); he rose to become the leader of its British branch, which he reformulated in accordance with Thelema. Through O.T.O., Thelemite groups were established in Britain, Australia, and North America. Crowley spent the First World War in the United States, where he took up painting, and campaigned for the German war effort against Britain. His biographers later revealed that he had infiltrated the pro-German movement to assist the British intelligence services. In 1920, he established the Abbey of Thelema, a religious commune in Cefalù, Sicily, where he lived with various followers. His libertine lifestyle led to denunciations in the British press, and the Italian government evicted him in 1923. He divided the following two decades among France, Germany and England, and continued to promote Thelema until his death.

Crowley gained widespread notoriety during his lifetime, being a drug user, a bisexual and an individualistic social critic. Crowley has remained a highly influential figure over western esotericism and the counterculture of the 1960s, and he continues to be considered a prophet in Thelema. He is the subject of various biographies and academic studies.

== Early life ==
=== Youth ===
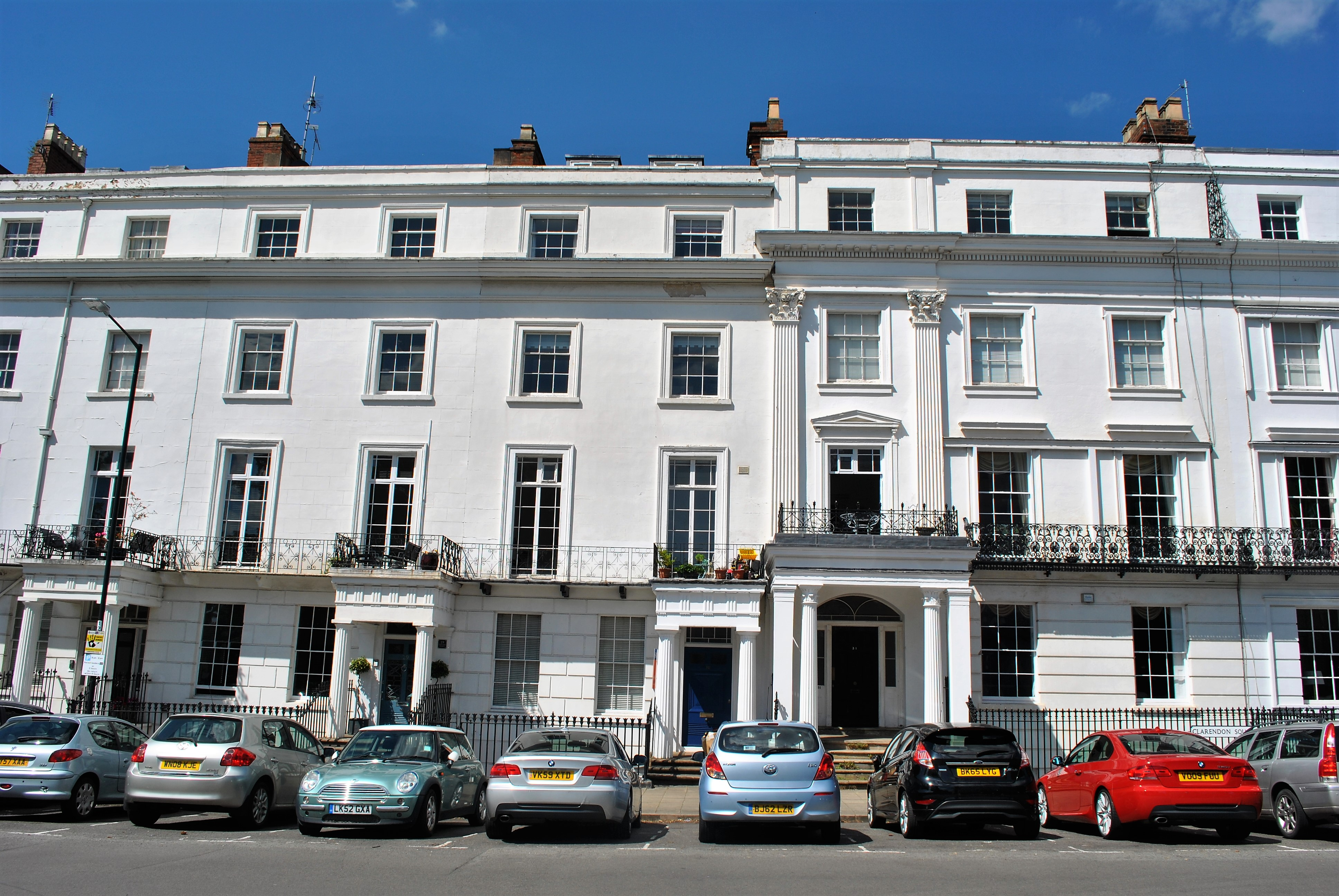
Aleister Crowley was born Edward Alexander Crowley at 30 Clarendon Square in Royal Leamington Spa, Warwickshire, on 12 October 1875.

Crowley was born Edward Alexander Crowley at 30 Clarendon Square in Royal Leamington Spa, Warwickshire, England, on 12 October 1875. His father, Edward Crowley, was trained as an engineer, but his share in a lucrative family brewing business, Crowley's Alton Ales, allowed him to retire before his son was born. His mother, Emily Bertha Bishop, came from a Devonshire-Somerset family and had a strained relationship with her son; she described him as "the Beast", a name that he revelled in. The couple had been married at London's Kensington and Chelsea Register Office in November 1874, and were evangelical Christians. Crowley's father was born a Quaker, but converted to the Exclusive Brethren, a faction of a Christian fundamentalist group known as the Plymouth Brethren; Emily likewise converted upon marriage. Crowley's father was particularly devout, spending his time as a travelling preacher for the sect and reading a chapter from the Bible to his wife and son after breakfast every day. Following the death of their baby daughter in 1880, in 1881 the Crowleys moved to Redhill, Surrey. At the age of 8, Crowley was sent to H. T. Habershon's evangelical Christian boarding school in Hastings, and then to Ebor preparatory school in Cambridge, run by the Reverend Henry d'Arcy Champney, whom Crowley considered a sadist.

In March 1887, when Crowley was eleven years old, his father died of tongue cancer. Crowley described this as a turning point in his life, and he always maintained an admiration of his father, describing him as "my hero and my friend". Inheriting a third of his father's wealth, he began misbehaving at school and was harshly punished by Champney; Crowley's family removed him from the school when he developed albuminuria. He then attended Malvern College and Tonbridge School, both of which he despised and left after a few terms. He became increasingly sceptical of Christianity, pointing out Biblical inconsistencies to his religious teachers, and went against the Christian morality of his upbringing by smoking, masturbating, and having sex with prostitutes from whom he contracted gonorrhea. Sent to live with a Brethren tutor in Eastbourne, he undertook chemistry courses at Eastbourne College. Crowley developed interests in chess, poetry, and mountain climbing, and in 1894 climbed Beachy Head before visiting the Alps and joining the Scottish Mountaineering Club. The following year he returned to the Bernese Alps, climbing the Eiger, Trift, Jungfrau, Mönch, and Wetterhorn.

=== Cambridge University: 1895–1898 ===
Having adopted the name of Aleister over Edward, in October 1895 Crowley began a three-year course at Trinity College, Cambridge, where he was entered for the Moral Science exam (Tripos) studying philosophy. With approval from his personal tutor, he changed to English literature, which was not then part of the curriculum offered. Crowley spent much of his time at university engaged in his pastimes, becoming president of the chess club and practising the game for two hours a day; he briefly considered a professional career as a chess player. Crowley also embraced his love of literature and poetry, particularly the works of Richard Francis Burton and Percy Bysshe Shelley. Many of his own poems appeared in student publications such as The Granta, Cambridge Magazine, and Cantab. He continued his mountaineering, going on holiday to the Alps to climb every year from 1894 to 1898, often with his friend Oscar Eckenstein, and in 1897 he made the first ascent of the Mönch without a guide. These feats led to his recognition in the Alpine mountaineering community.

For many years I had loathed being called Alick, partly because of the unpleasant sound and sight of the word, partly because it was the name by which my mother called me. Edward did not seem to suit me and the diminutives Ted or Ned were even less appropriate. Alexander was too long and Sandy suggested tow hair and freckles. I had read in some book or other that the most favourable name for becoming famous was one consisting of a dactyl followed by a spondee, as at the end of a hexameter: like Jeremy Taylor. Aleister Crowley fulfilled these conditions and Aleister is the Gaelic form of Alexander. To adopt it would satisfy my romantic ideals.

— Aleister Crowley, on his name change.

Crowley had his first significant mystical experience while on holiday in Stockholm in December 1896. Several biographers, including Lawrence Sutin, Richard Kaczynski, and Tobias Churton, believed that this was the result of Crowley's first same-sex sexual experience, which enabled him to recognize his bisexuality. At Cambridge, Crowley maintained a vigorous sex life with women—largely with female prostitutes, from one of whom he caught syphilis—but eventually he took part in same-sex activities, despite their illegality. In October 1897, Crowley met Herbert Charles Pollitt, president of the Cambridge University Footlights Dramatic Club, and the two entered into a relationship. They broke apart because Pollitt did not share Crowley's increasing interest in Western esotericism, a break-up that Crowley regretted for many years.

In 1897, Crowley travelled to Saint Petersburg, Russia, later saying that he was trying to learn Russian, because he was considering a future diplomatic career there. In October 1897, a brief illness triggered considerations of mortality and "the futility of all human endeavour", and he abandoned all thoughts of a diplomatic career in favour of pursuing an interest in the occult.

In March 1898, he obtained A. E. Waite's The Book of Black Magic and of Pacts and Karl von Eckartshausen's The Cloud upon the Sanctuary, furthering his occult interests. That same year, Leonard Smithers, a publisher whom Crowley had met through Pollitt, published 100 copies of Crowley's poem Aceldama: A Place to Bury Strangers In, but it was not a particular success. That same year, Crowley published a string of other poems, including White Stains, a Decadent collection of erotic poetry that was printed abroad lest its publication be prohibited by the British authorities. In July 1898, he left Cambridge without a degree, despite a "first class" showing in his 1897 exams and consistent "second class honours" results before that.

=== The Golden Dawn: 1898–1899 ===
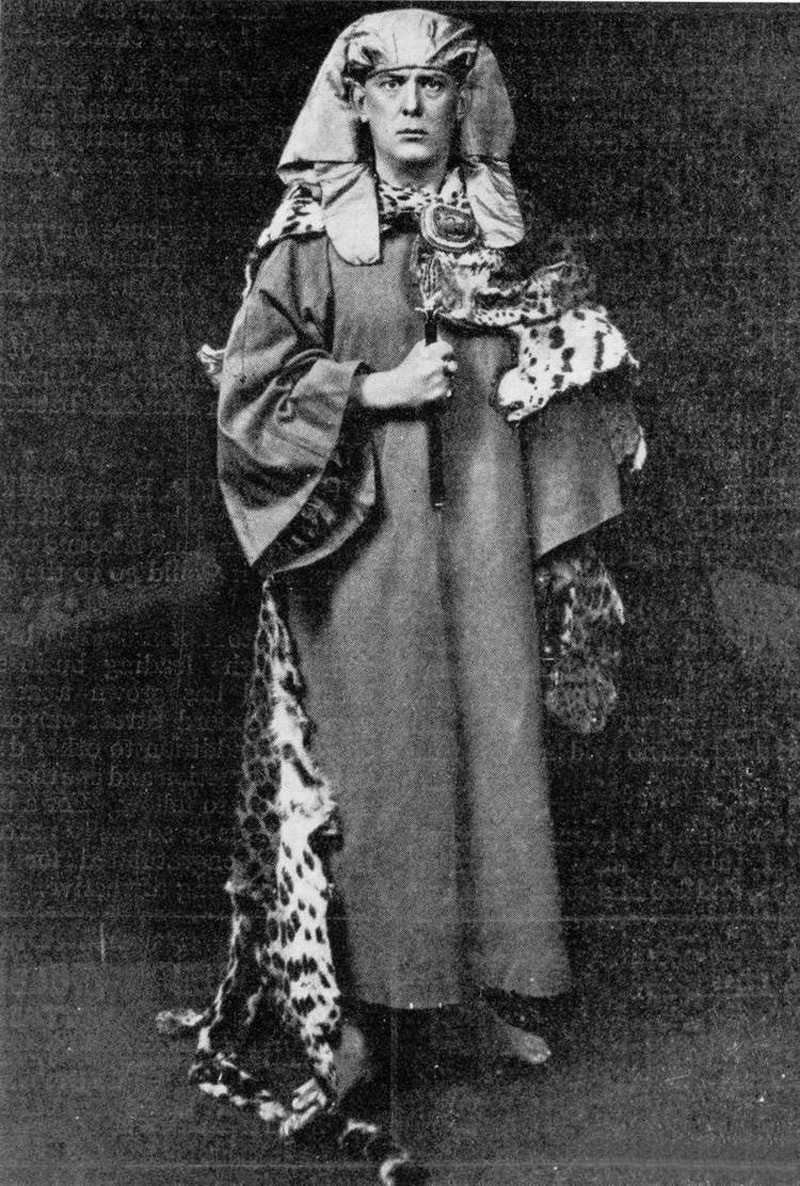
Crowley in Golden Dawn garb, 1910

In August 1898, Crowley was in Zermatt, Switzerland, where he met the chemist Julian L. Baker, and the two began discussing their common interest in alchemy. Back in London, Baker introduced Crowley to George Cecil Jones, Baker's brother-in-law and a fellow member of the occult society known as the Hermetic Order of the Golden Dawn, which was founded in 1888. Crowley was initiated into the Outer Order of the Golden Dawn on 18 November 1898 by the group's leader, Samuel Liddell MacGregor Mathers. The ceremony took place in the Golden Dawn's Isis-Urania Temple held at London's Mark Masons Hall, where Crowley took the magical motto and name "Frater Perdurabo", which he interpreted as "Brother I shall endure to the end".

Crowley moved into his own luxury flat at 67–69 Chancery Lane in London and soon invited a senior Golden Dawn member, Allan Bennett, to live with him as his personal magical tutor. Bennett taught Crowley more about ceremonial magic and the ritual use of drugs, and together they performed the rituals of the Goetia, until Bennett left for South Asia to study Buddhism. In November 1899, Crowley purchased Boleskine House in Foyers on the shore of Loch Ness in Scotland. He developed a love of Scottish culture, describing himself as the "Laird of Boleskine", and took to wearing traditional highland dress even during visits to London. He continued writing poetry, publishing Jezebel and Other Tragic Poems, Tales of Archais, Songs of the Spirit, Appeal to the American Republic, and Jephthah in 1898–99; most gained mixed reviews from literary critics, although Jephthah was considered a particular critical success.

Crowley soon progressed through the lower grades of the Golden Dawn, and was ready to enter the group's inner Second Order. He was unpopular in the group; his bisexuality and libertine lifestyle gained him a bad reputation, and he developed feuds with some of the members, including W. B. Yeats. When the Golden Dawn's London lodge refused to initiate Crowley into the Second Order, he visited Mathers in Paris, who personally admitted him into the Adeptus Minor Grade. A schism had developed between Mathers and the London members of the Golden Dawn, who were unhappy with his autocratic rule. Acting under Mathers' orders, Crowley—with the help of his mistress and fellow initiate Elaine Simpson—attempted to seize the Vault of the Adepts, a temple space at 36 Blythe Road in West Kensington, from the London lodge members. When the case was taken to court, the judge ruled in favour of the London lodge, as they had paid for the space's rent, leaving both Crowley and Mathers isolated from the group.

=== Mexico, India, Paris, and marriage: 1900–1903 ===
In 1900, Crowley travelled to Mexico via the United States, settling in Mexico City and starting a relationship with a local woman. Developing a love of the country, he continued experimenting with ceremonial magic, working with John Dee's Enochian invocations. He later said he had been initiated into Freemasonry while there, and he wrote a play based on Richard Wagner's opera Tannhäuser as well as a series of poems published as Oracles (1905). Eckenstein joined him later in 1900, and together they climbed several mountains in the country, including Iztaccihuatl, Popocatepetl, and Colima, the latter of which they had to abandon owing to a volcanic eruption. Upon leaving Mexico, Crowley headed to San Francisco before sailing for Hawaii aboard the Nippon Maru. On the ship, he had a brief affair with a married woman named Mary Alice Rogers; saying he fell in love with her, he wrote a series of poems about the romance, published as Alice: An Adultery (1903).

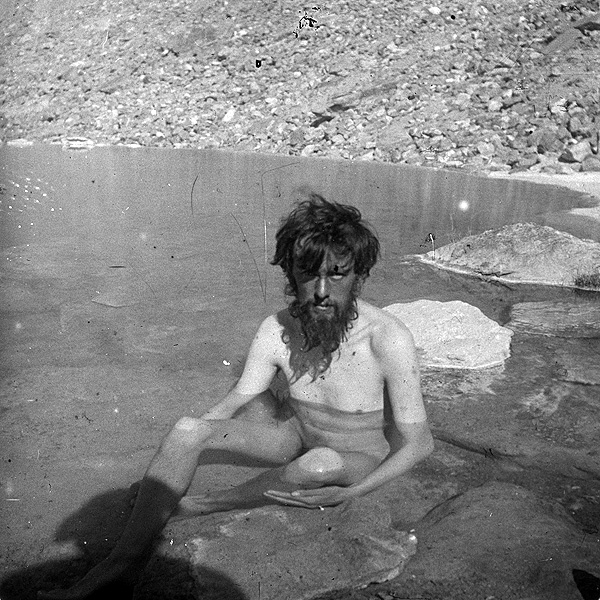
Crowley during the K2 Expedition, 1902

After briefly stopping in Japan and Hong Kong, Crowley reached Ceylon, where he met with Allan Bennett, who was there studying Shaivism. The pair spent some time in Kandy before Bennett decided to become a Theravada Buddhist monk, travelling to Burma to do so. Crowley then decided to tour India, devoting himself to the Hindu practice of Rāja yoga, by which means he believed he had achieved the spiritual state of dhyana. He spent much of this time studying at the Meenakshi Temple in Madura. At this time he also wrote poetry which was published as The Sword of Song (1904). He contracted malaria, and had to recuperate from the disease in Calcutta and Rangoon. In 1902, he was joined in India by Eckenstein and several other mountaineers: Guy Knowles, H. Pfannl, V. Wesseley, and Jules Jacot-Guillarmod. Together, the Eckenstein-Crowley expedition attempted K2, which had never been climbed before. On the journey, Crowley was afflicted with influenza, malaria, and snow blindness, and other expedition members were also struck with illness. They reached an altitude of 20,000 feet (6,100 m) before turning back.

Having arrived in Paris in November 1902, he socialized with painter Gerald Kelly, and through him became a fixture of the Parisian arts scene. Whilst there, Crowley wrote a series of poems on the work of the sculptor Auguste Rodin, an acquaintance. These poems were later published as Rodin in Rime (1907). One of those frequenting this milieu was W. Somerset Maugham, who after briefly meeting Crowley later used him as a model for the character of Oliver Haddo in his novel The Magician (1908).

Crowley returned to Boleskine in April 1903. In August, he wed Gerald Kelly's sister Rose Edith Kelly in a "marriage of convenience" to prevent her from entering an arranged marriage; this appalled the Kelly family and damaged his friendship with Gerald. Heading on honeymoon to Paris, Cairo, and then Ceylon, Crowley fell in love with Rose and worked to prove his affections. While on their honeymoon, he wrote a series of love poems to Rose later published as Rosa Mundi and other Love Songs (1906), as well as the religious satire Why Jesus Wept (1904).

== Developing Thelema ==
=== Egypt and The Book of the Law ===
Had! The manifestation of Nuit.
The unveiling of the company of heaven.
Every man and every woman is a star.
Every number is infinite; there is no difference.
Help me, o warrior lord of Thebes, in my unveiling before the Children of men!

— The opening lines of The Book of the Law

In February 1904, Crowley and Rose arrived in Cairo. Pretending to be a prince and princess, they rented an apartment in which Crowley set up a temple room and began invoking ancient Egyptian deities, while studying Islamic mysticism and Arabic. According to Crowley's later account, Rose regularly became delirious and informed him that "they are waiting for you." On 18 March, she explained that "they" were the god Horus, and on 20 March she proclaimed that "the Equinox of the Gods has come". She led him to a nearby museum, where she showed him a seventh-century BCE mortuary stele known as the Stele of Ankh-ef-en-Khonsu; Crowley thought it important that the exhibit's number was 666, the Number of the Beast in Christian belief, and in later years termed the artefact the "Stele of Revealing".

According to Crowley's later statements, on 8 April he heard a disembodied voice identifying itself as that of Aiwass, the messenger of Horus (or Hoor-Paar-Kraat). Crowley said that he wrote down everything the voice told him over the course of the next three days, and titled it Liber AL vel Legis or The Book of the Law. The book proclaimed that humanity was entering a new Aeon, and that Crowley would serve as its prophet. It stated that a new supreme moral law was to be introduced in this Aeon, "Do what thou wilt shall be the whole of the Law," and that people should learn to live in tune with their True Will. This book, and the philosophy that it espoused, became the cornerstone of Thelema. Crowley said that at the time he was unsure what to do with The Book of the Law. Often resenting it, he said that he ignored the instructions which the text commanded him to perform, which included taking the stele from the museum, fortifying his own island, and translating the book into all the world's languages. According to his account, he instead sent typescripts of the work to several occultists he knew before putting the manuscript away and ignoring it.

=== Kanchenjunga and China: 1904–1906 ===
Upon returning to Boleskine, Crowley came to believe that Mathers was using magic against him, and the relationship between the two broke down. On 28 July 1904, Rose gave birth to Crowley's first daughter, Nuit Ma Ahathoor Hecate Sappho Jezebel Lilith, and Crowley wrote the pornographic Snowdrops from a Curate's Garden to entertain his recuperating wife. He also founded a publishing company through which to publish his poetry, naming it the Society for the Propagation of Religious Truth in parody of the Society for Promoting Christian Knowledge. Among its first publications were Crowley's Collected Works, edited by Ivor Back, an old friend of Crowley's who was both a practicing surgeon and an enthusiast of literature. His poetry often received strong reviews (either positive or negative), but never sold well. In an attempt to gain more publicity, he issued a reward of £100 for the best essay on his work. The winner of this was J. F. C. Fuller, a British Army officer and military historian, whose essay, "The Star in the West" (1907), heralded Crowley's poetry as some of the greatest ever written.

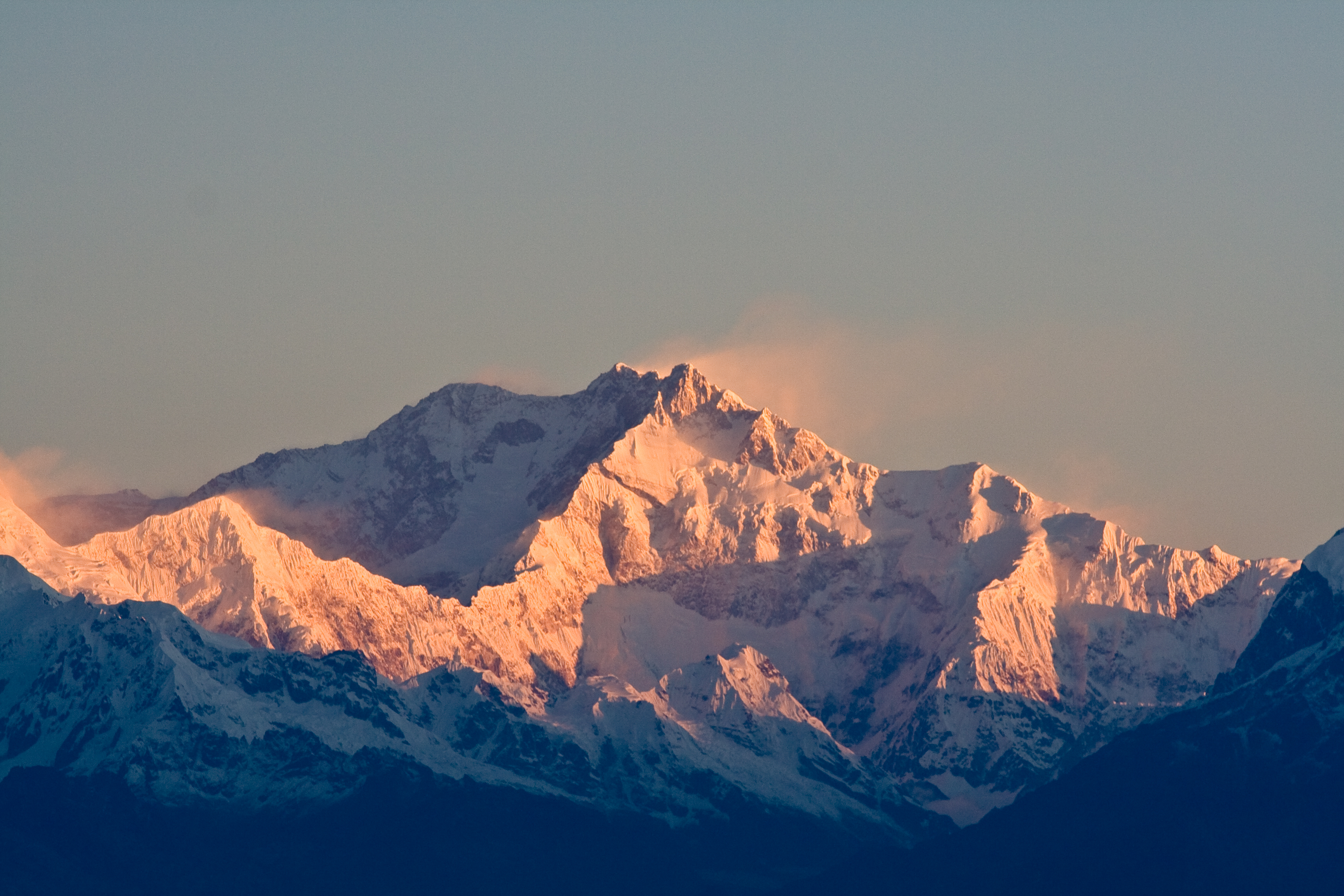
Kanchenjunga, as seen from Darjeeling

Crowley decided to climb Kanchenjunga in the Himalayas of Nepal, widely recognised as the world's most treacherous mountain. The collaboration between Jacot-Guillarmod, Charles Adolphe Reymond, Alexis Pache, and Alcesti C. Rigo de Righi, the expedition was marred by much argument between Crowley and the others, who thought that he was reckless. They eventually mutinied against Crowley's control, with the other climbers heading back down the mountain as nightfall approached despite Crowley's warnings that it was too dangerous. Subsequently, Pache and several porters were killed in an accident, something for which Crowley was widely blamed by the mountaineering community.

Spending time in Moharbhanj, where he took part in big-game hunting and wrote the homoerotic work The Scented Garden, Crowley met up with Rose and Lilith in Calcutta before being forced to leave India after non-lethally shooting two men who tried to mug him. Briefly visiting Bennett in Burma, Crowley and his family decided to tour Southern China, hiring porters and a nanny for the purpose. Crowley smoked opium throughout the journey, which took the family from Tengyueh through to Yungchang, Tali, Yunnanfu, and then Hanoi. On the way, he spent much time on spiritual and magical work, reciting the "Bornless Ritual", an invocation to his Holy Guardian Angel, on a daily basis.

While Rose and Lilith returned to Europe, Crowley headed to Shanghai to meet old friend Elaine Simpson, who was fascinated by The Book of the Law; together they performed rituals in an attempt to contact Aiwass. Crowley then sailed to Japan and Canada, before continuing to New York City, where he unsuccessfully solicited support for a second expedition up Kanchenjunga. Upon arrival in Britain, Crowley learned that his daughter Lilith had died of typhoid in Rangoon, something he later blamed on Rose's increasing alcoholism. Under emotional distress, his health began to suffer, and he underwent a series of surgical operations. He began short-lived romances with actress Vera "Lola" Neville (née Snepp) and author Ada Leverson.

Meanwhile, Rose gave birth to the couple's second daughter, Lola Zaza Crowley, in late 1907. The child contracted bronchitis and almost died.

=== The A∴A∴ and The Holy Books of Thelema: 1907–1909 ===
With his old mentor George Cecil Jones, Crowley continued performing the Abramelin rituals at the Ashdown Park Hotel in Coulsdon, Surrey. Crowley believed that in doing so he attained samadhi, or union with the Godhead, thereby marking a turning point in his life. Making heavy use of hashish during these rituals, he wrote an essay on "The Psychology of Hashish" (1909) in which he championed the drug as an aid to mysticism. He also said he had been contacted once again by Aiwass in late October and November 1907, adding that Aiwass dictated two further texts to him, "Liber VII" and "Liber Cordis Cincti Serpente", both of which were later classified in the corpus of The Holy Books of Thelema. Crowley wrote down more Thelemic Holy Books during the last two months of the year, including "Liber LXVI", "Liber Arcanorum", "Liber Porta Lucis, Sub Figura X", "Liber Tau", "Liber Trigrammaton" and "Liber DCCCXIII vel Ararita", which he again said he had received from a preternatural source. Crowley stated that in June 1909, when the manuscript of The Book of the Law was rediscovered at Boleskine, he developed the opinion that Thelema represented objective truth.

Crowley's inheritance was running out. Trying to earn money, he was hired by George Montagu Bennett, the Earl of Tankerville, to help protect him from witchcraft; recognising Bennett's paranoia as being based in his cocaine addiction, Crowley took him on holiday to France and Morocco to recuperate. In 1907, he also began taking in paying students, whom he instructed in occult and magical practice. Victor Neuburg, whom Crowley met in February 1907, became his sexual partner and closest disciple; in 1908 the pair toured northern Spain before heading to Tangier, Morocco. The following year Neuburg stayed at Boleskine, where he and Crowley engaged in sadomasochism. Crowley continued to write prolifically, producing such works of poetry as Ambergris, Clouds Without Water, and Konx Om Pax, as well as his first attempt at an autobiography, The World's Tragedy. Recognizing the popularity of short horror stories, Crowley wrote his own, some of which were published, and he also published several articles in Vanity Fair, a magazine edited by his friend Frank Harris. He also wrote Liber 777, a book of Qabalistic and magical correspondences that borrowed from Mathers and Bennett.

Into my loneliness comes—
The sound of a flute in dim groves that haunt the uttermost hills.
Even from the brave river they reach to the edge of the wilderness.
And I behold Pan.

— The opening lines of Liber VII (1907), the first of the Holy Books of Thelema to be revealed to Crowley after The Book of the Law.

In November 1907, Crowley and Jones decided to found an occult order to act as a successor to the Hermetic Order of the Golden Dawn, being aided in doing so by Fuller. The result was the A∴A∴. The group's headquarters and temple were situated at 124 Victoria Street in central London, and their rites borrowed much from those of the Golden Dawn, but with an added Thelemic basis. Its earliest members included solicitor Richard Noel Warren, artist Austin Osman Spare, Horace Sheridan-Bickers, author George Raffalovich, Francis Henry Everard Joseph Feilding, engineer Herbert Edward Inman, Kenneth Ward, and Charles Stansfeld Jones. In March 1909, Crowley began production of a biannual periodical titled The Equinox. He billed this periodical, which was to become the "Official Organ" of the A∴A∴, as "The Review of Scientific Illuminism".

Crowley became increasingly frustrated with Rose's alcoholism. In November 1909 he divorced her on the grounds of his own adultery. Lola was entrusted to Rose's care; the couple remained friends and Rose continued to live at Boleskine. Her alcoholism worsened, however, and as a result she was institutionalized in September 1911.

=== Algeria and the Rites of Eleusis: 1909–1911 ===
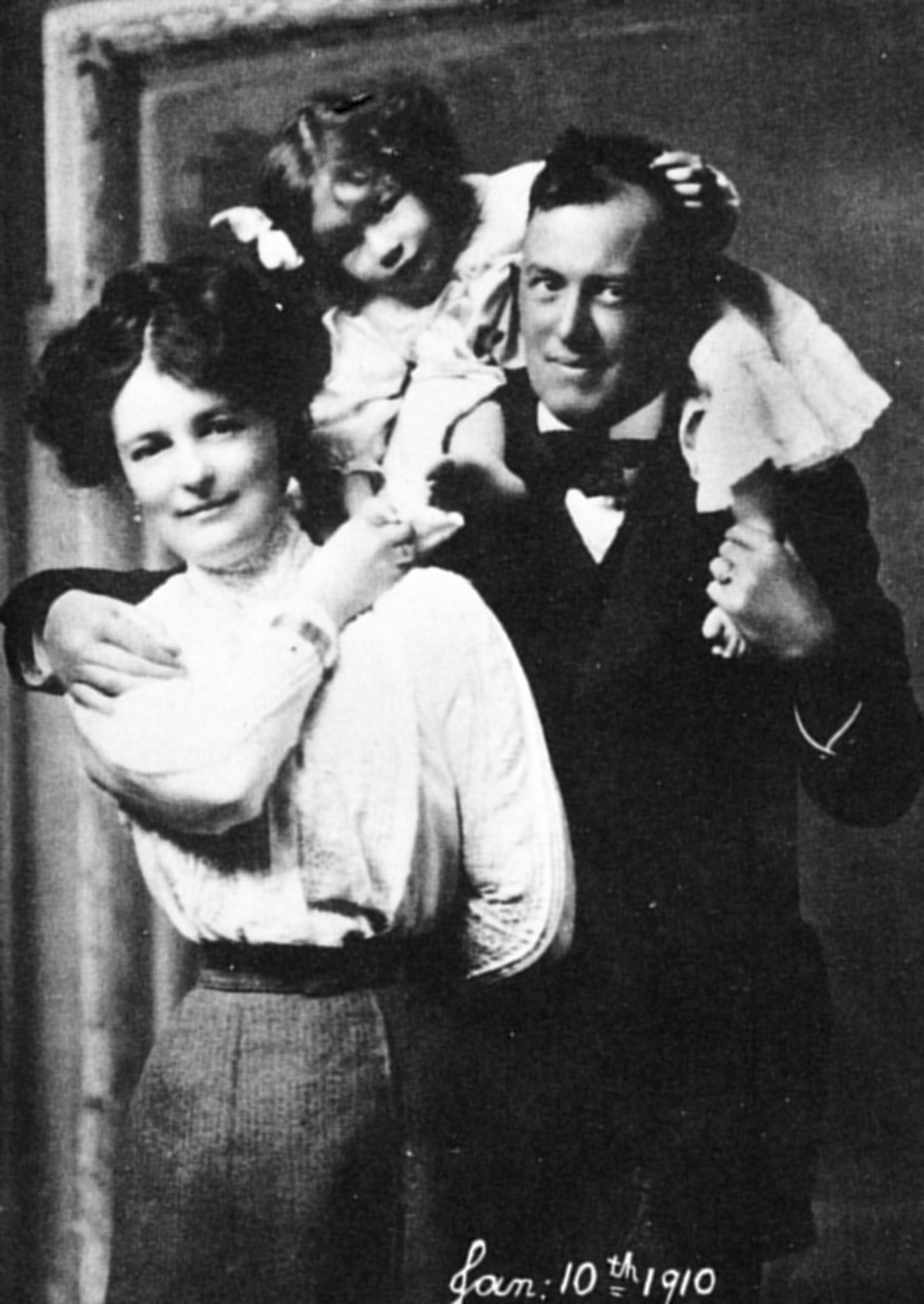
Rose Kelly with Crowley and their daughter, Lola Zaza

In November 1909, Crowley and Neuburg travelled to Algeria, touring the desert from El Arba to Aumale, Bou Saâda, and then Dā'leh Addin, with Crowley reciting the Quran to fortify himself against growing feelings of awe and dread. During the trip he invoked the thirty aethyrs of Enochian magic, with Neuburg recording the results; this text was later published in The Equinox as The Vision and the Voice. Following a mountaintop sex magic ritual, Crowley also performed an evocation to the demon Choronzon involving blood sacrifice, and considered the results to be a watershed in his magical career. Returning to London in January 1910, Crowley found that Mathers was suing him for publishing Golden Dawn secrets in The Equinox; the court found in favour of Crowley. The case was widely reported in the press, with Crowley gaining wider fame as a result; he enjoyed this, and played into the sensationalist accusations of his being a Satanist and advocate of human sacrifice.

The publicity attracted new members to the A∴A∴, among them Frank Bennett, James Bayley, Herbert Close, and James Windram. The Australian violinist Leila Waddell soon became Crowley's lover. Deciding to expand his teachings to a wider audience, Crowley developed the Rites of Artemis, a public performance of magic and symbolism featuring A∴A∴ members personifying various deities. It was first performed at the A∴A∴ headquarters, with attendees given a fruit punch containing peyote to enhance their experience. Various members of the press attended, and reported largely positively on it. In October and November 1910, Crowley decided to stage something similar, the Rites of Eleusis, at Caxton Hall in Westminster; this time press reviews were mixed. Crowley came under particular criticism from West de Wend Fenton, editor of The Looking Glass newspaper, who called him "one of the most blasphemous and cold-blooded villains of modern times". Fenton's articles suggested that Crowley and Jones were involved in homosexual activity; Crowley did not mind this, but Jones unsuccessfully sued for libel. Fuller broke off his friendship and involvement with Crowley over the scandal, and Crowley and Neuburg returned to Algeria for further magical workings.

The Equinox continued publishing, and various books of literature and poetry were also published under its imprint, like Crowley's Ambergris, The Winged Beetle, and The Scented Garden, as well as Neuburg's The Triumph of Pan and Ethel Archer's The Whirlpool. In 1911, Crowley and Waddell holidayed in Montigny-sur-Loing, France, where he wrote prolifically, producing poems, short stories, plays, and 19 works on magic and mysticism, including the two final Holy Books of Thelema. In Paris, he met Mary Desti, who became his next "Scarlet Woman", with the two undertaking magical workings in St. Moritz, Switzerland; Crowley believed that one of the Secret Chiefs, Ab-ul-Diz, was speaking through her. Based on Desti's statements when in trance, Crowley wrote the two-volume Book 4 (1912–13) and at the time developed the spelling "magick" in reference to the paranormal phenomenon as a means of distinguishing it from stage magic.

=== Ordo Templi Orientis and the Paris Working: 1912–1914 ===
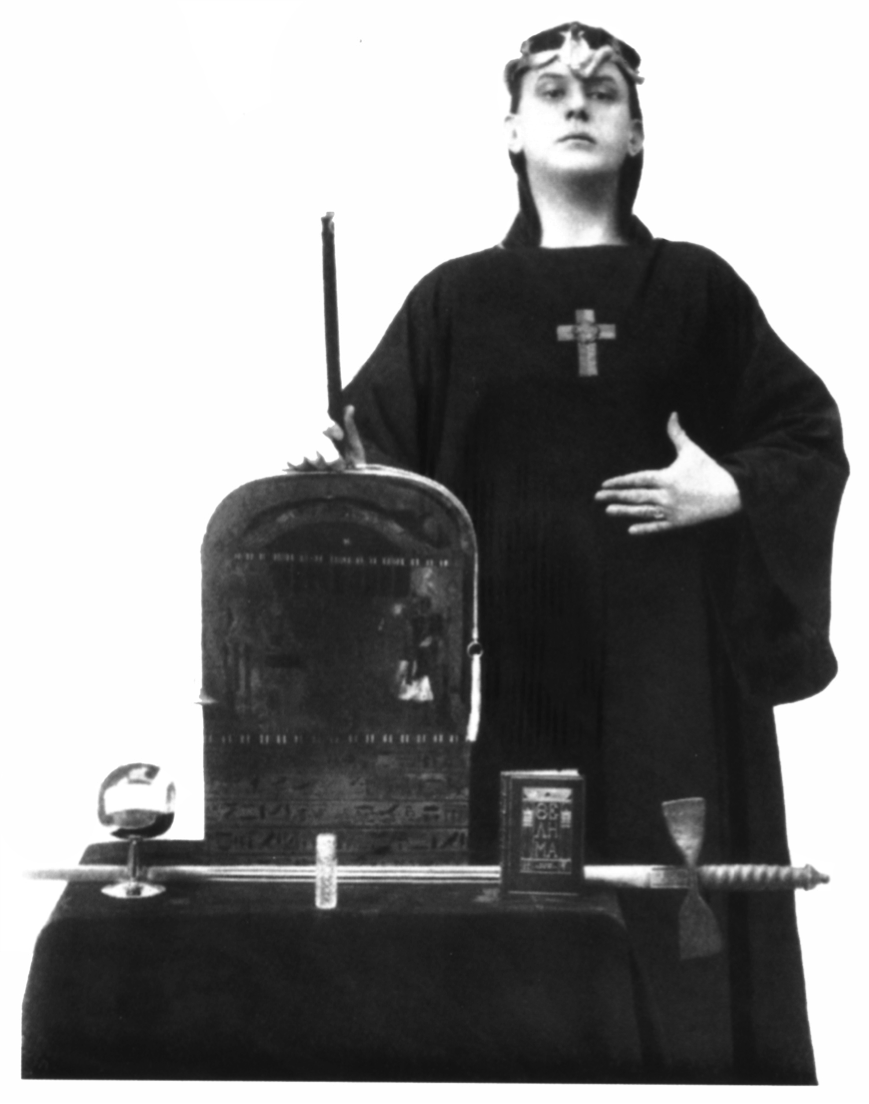
Crowley in ceremonial garb, 1912

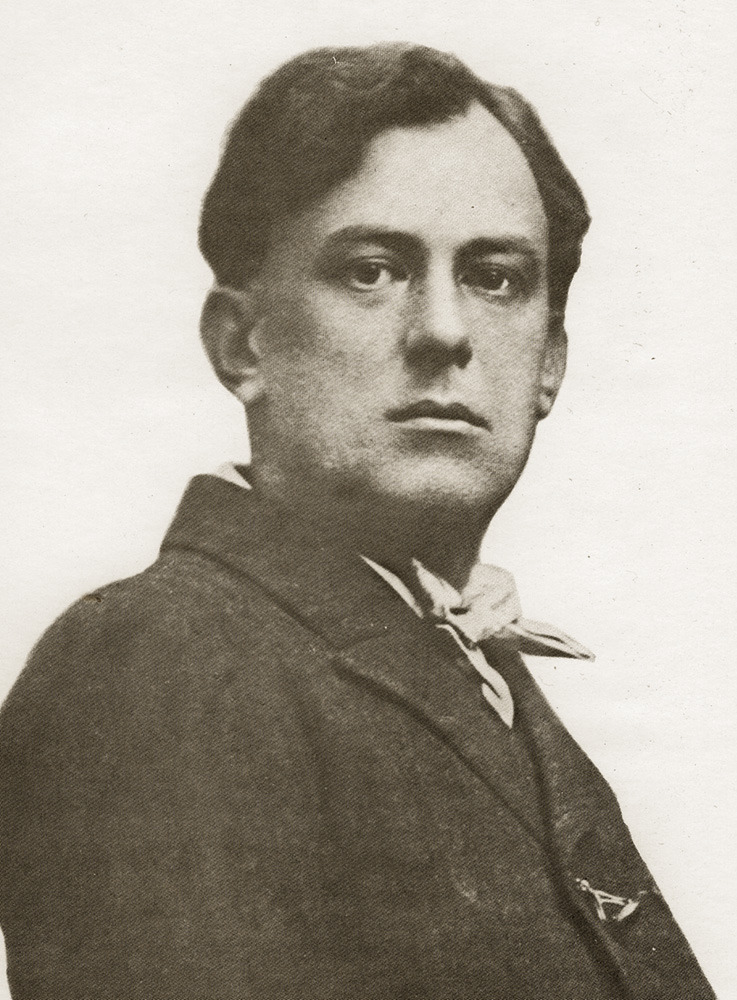
c. 1912

In early 1912, Crowley published The Book of Lies, a work of mysticism that biographer Lawrence Sutin later described as "his greatest success in merging his talents as poet, scholar, and magus". The German occultist Theodor Reuss later accused him of publishing some of the secrets of his own occult order, Ordo Templi Orientis (O.T.O.), within The Book of Lies. Crowley convinced Reuss that the similarities were coincidental, and the two became friends. Reuss appointed Crowley as head of O.T.O's British branch, the Mysteria Mystica Maxima (MMM), and at a ceremony in Berlin Crowley adopted the magical name of Baphomet and was proclaimed "X° Supreme Rex and Sovereign Grand Master General of Ireland, Iona, and all the Britons". With Reuss' permission, Crowley set about advertising the MMM and re-writing many O.T.O. rituals, which were then based largely on Freemasonry; his incorporation of Thelemite elements proved controversial in the group. Fascinated by the O.T.O's emphasis on sex magic, Crowley devised a magical working based on anal sex and incorporated it into the syllabus for those O.T.O. members who were initiated into the eleventh degree.

In March 1913, Crowley acted as producer for The Ragged Ragtime Girls, a group of female violinists led by Waddell, as they performed at London's Old Tivoli theatre. They subsequently performed in Moscow for six weeks, where Crowley had a sadomasochistic relationship with the Hungarian Anny Ringler. In Moscow, Crowley continued to write plays and poetry, including "Hymn to Pan", and the Gnostic Mass, a Thelemic ritual that became a key part of O.T.O. liturgy. Churton suggested that Crowley had travelled to Moscow on the orders of British intelligence to spy on revolutionary elements in the city. In January 1914, Crowley and Neuburg settled into an apartment in Paris, where the former was involved in the controversy surrounding Jacob Epstein's new monument to Oscar Wilde. Together Crowley and Neuburg performed the six-week "Paris Working", a period of intense ritual involving strong drug use in which they invoked the gods Mercury and Jupiter. As part of the ritual, the couple performed acts of sex magic together, at times being joined by journalist Walter Duranty. Inspired by the results of the Working, Crowley wrote Liber Agapé, a treatise on sex magic. Following the Paris Working, Neuburg began to distance himself from Crowley, resulting in an argument in which Crowley cursed him.

=== United States: 1914–1919 ===
By 1914, Crowley was living a hand-to-mouth existence, relying largely on donations from A∴A∴ members and dues payments made to O.T.O. In May, he transferred ownership of Boleskine House to the MMM for financial reasons, and in July he went mountaineering in the Swiss Alps. During this time the First World War broke out. After recuperating from a bout of phlebitis, Crowley set sail for the United States aboard the RMS Lusitania in October 1914. Arriving in New York City, he moved into a hotel and began earning money writing for the American edition of Vanity Fair and undertaking freelance work for the famed astrologer Evangeline Adams. In the city, he continued experimenting with sex magic, through the use of masturbation, female prostitutes, and male clients of a Turkish bathhouse; all of these encounters were documented in his diaries.

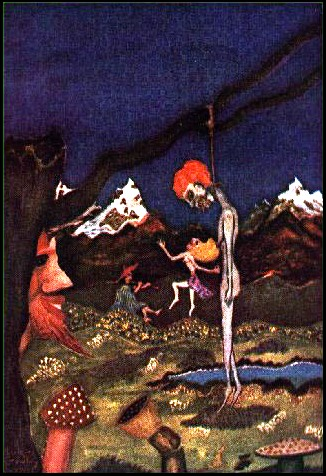
May Morn, one of Crowley's paintings from his time in the US. He explained it thus: "The painting represents the dawning of the day following a witches' celebration as described in Faust. The witch is hanged, as she deserves, and the satyr looks out from behind a tree."

Professing to be of Irish ancestry and a supporter of Irish independence from Great Britain, Crowley began to espouse support for Germany in their war against Britain. He became involved in New York's pro-German movement, and in January 1915 pro-German propagandist George Sylvester Viereck employed him as a writer for his propagandist paper, The Fatherland, which was dedicated to keeping the US neutral in the conflict. In later years, detractors denounced Crowley as a traitor to Britain for this action.

Crowley entered into a relationship with Jeanne Robert Foster, with whom he toured the West Coast. In Vancouver, headquarters of the North American O.T.O., he met with Charles Stansfeld Jones and Wilfred Talbot Smith to discuss the propagation of Thelema on the continent. In Detroit he experimented with peyote at Parke-Davis, then visited Seattle, San Francisco, Santa Cruz, Los Angeles, San Diego, Tijuana, and the Grand Canyon, before returning to New York. There he befriended Ananda Coomaraswamy and his wife Alice Richardson; Crowley and Richardson performed sex magic in April 1916, following which she became pregnant and then miscarried. Later that year he took a "magical retirement" to a cabin by Lake Pasquaney owned by Evangeline Adams. There, he made heavy use of drugs and undertook a ritual after which he proclaimed himself "Master Therion". He also wrote several short stories based on James George Frazer's The Golden Bough and a work of literary criticism, The Gospel According to Bernard Shaw.

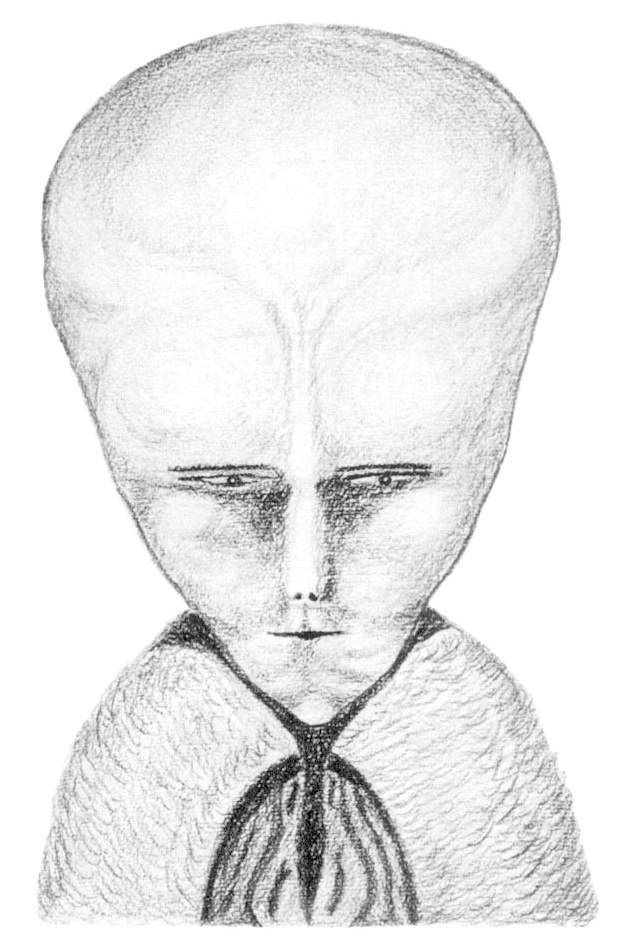
A drawing by Crowley of Lam

In December, he moved to New Orleans, his favourite US city, before spending February 1917 with evangelical Christian relatives in Titusville, Florida. Returning to New York City, he moved in with artist and A∴A∴ member Leon Engers Kennedy in May, learning of his mother's death. After the collapse of The Fatherland, Crowley continued his association with Viereck, who appointed him contributing editor of arts journal The International. Crowley used it to promote Thelema, but it soon ceased publication. He then moved to the studio apartment of Roddie Minor, who became his partner and Scarlet Woman. Through their rituals, which Crowley called "The Amalantrah Workings", he believed that they were contacted by a preternatural entity named Lam. The relationship soon ended.

In 1918, Crowley went on a magical retreat in the wilderness of Esopus Island on the Hudson River in upstate New York. Here, he began an adaptation (Note: Crowley did not read Chinese (Redmond 2021, p. 199, fn. 2); his "translations" of Chinese texts are more properly considered "radical adaptation[s]" of existing translations (Robinson 2017, p. 128).) of the Tao Te Ching, painted Thelemic slogans on the riverside cliffs, and—he later wrote—experienced past life memories of being Ge Xuan, Pope Alexander VI, Alessandro Cagliostro, and Éliphas Lévi. Back in New York City, he moved to Greenwich Village, where he took Leah Hirsig as his lover and next Scarlet Woman. He took up painting as a hobby, exhibiting his work at the Greenwich Village Liberal Club and attracting the attention of The Evening World. With the financial assistance of sympathetic Freemasons, Crowley revived The Equinox with the first issue of volume III, known as The Blue Equinox. He spent mid-1919 on a climbing holiday in Montauk, New York, on Long Island, before returning to London in December.

=== Abbey of Thelema: 1920–1923 ===
Now destitute and back in London, Crowley came under attack from the tabloid John Bull, which labelled him traitorous "scum" for his work with the German war effort; several friends aware of his intelligence work urged him to sue, but he decided not to. When he was suffering from asthma, a doctor prescribed him heroin, to which he soon became addicted. In January 1920, he moved to France, renting a house in Fontainebleau with Hirsig; they were soon joined in a ménage à trois by Ninette Shumway, and also (in living arrangement) by Leah's newborn daughter Anne "Poupée" Leah. Crowley had ideas of forming a community of Thelemites, which he called the Abbey of Thelema after the Abbaye de Thélème in François Rabelais' Gargantua and Pantagruel. After consulting the I Ching, he chose Cefalù in Sicily as a location, and after arriving there, began renting the old Villa Santa Barbara as his Abbey on 2 April.

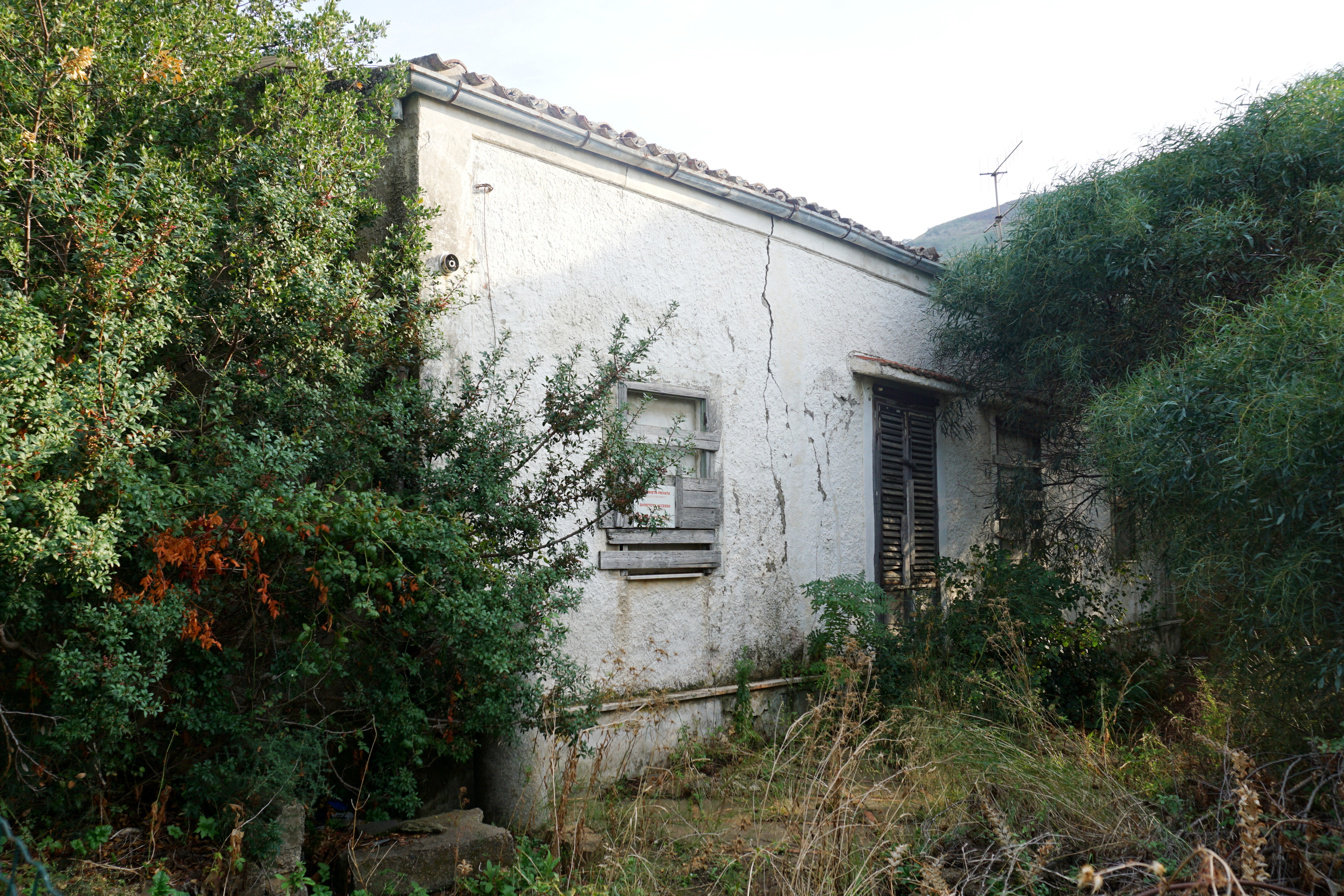
The dilapidated Abbey of Thelema in Cefalù, Sicily, in 2017

Moving to the commune with Hirsig, Shumway, and their children Hansi, Howard, and Poupée, Crowley described the scenario as "perfectly happy ... my idea of heaven." They wore robes, and performed rituals to the sun god Ra at set times during the day, also occasionally performing the Gnostic Mass; the rest of the day they were left to follow their own interests. Undertaking widespread correspondences, Crowley continued to paint, wrote a commentary on The Book of the Law, and revised the third part of Book 4. He offered a libertine education for the children, allowing them to play all day and witness acts of sex magic. He occasionally travelled to Palermo to visit male prostitutes and buy supplies and drugs; his heroin addiction came to dominate his life, and cocaine use began to erode his nasal cavity. There was no cleaning rota, and wild dogs and cats wandered throughout the Abbey, which soon became unsanitary. Poupée died in October 1920, and Ninette gave birth to a daughter, Astarte Lulu Panthea, soon afterwards.

New followers continued to arrive at the Abbey to be taught by Crowley. Among them was actress Jane Wolfe; after arrived in July 1920, she was initiated into the A∴A∴ and became Crowley's secretary. Another was Cecil Frederick Russell, who often argued with Crowley, disliking the same-sex sexual magic that he was required to perform, and left after a year. More conducive was the Australian Thelemite Frank Bennett, who also spent several months at the Abbey. In February 1922, Crowley returned to Paris for a retreat in an unsuccessful attempt to kick his heroin addiction. He then went to London in search of money, where he published articles in The English Review criticising the Dangerous Drugs Act 1920 and wrote a novel, The Diary of a Drug Fiend, completed in July. On publication, it received mixed reviews; the Sunday Express called for its burning and used its influence to prevent further reprints.

Subsequently, a young Thelemite named Raoul Loveday moved to the Abbey with his wife Betty May; while Loveday was devoted to Crowley, May detested him and life at the commune. She later said that Loveday was made to drink the blood of a sacrificed cat, and that they were required to cut themselves with razors every time they used the pronoun "I". Loveday drank from a polluted local stream, soon developing a liver infection resulting in his death in February 1923. Upon returning to London, May told her story to the press. John Bull proclaimed Crowley "the wickedest man in the world" and "a man we'd like to hang", and although Crowley deemed many of their accusations against him to be slanderous, he was unable to afford the legal fees to sue them. As a result, John Bull continued its attack, with its stories being repeated in newspapers throughout Europe and in North America. The Fascist government of Benito Mussolini soon learned of Crowley's activities, and in April 1923 he was given a deportation notice; without him, the Abbey closed.

== Later life ==
=== Tunisia, Paris, and London: 1923–1929 ===
Crowley and Hirsig went to Tunis, where, dogged by continuing poor health, he unsuccessfully tried again to give up heroin, and began writing what he termed his "autohagiography", The Confessions of Aleister Crowley. They were joined in Tunis by the Thelemite Norman Mudd, who became Crowley's public relations consultant. Employing a local boy, Mohammad ben Brahim, as his servant, Crowley went with him on a retreat to Nefta, where they performed sex magic together. In January 1924, Crowley travelled to Nice, France, where he met with Frank Harris, underwent a series of nasal operations, and visited the Institute for the Harmonious Development of Man, developing a positive opinion of its founder George Gurdjieff. Destitute, he took on a wealthy student, Alexander Zu Zolar, before taking on another American follower, Dorothy Olsen. Crowley took Olsen back to Tunisia for a magical retreat in Nefta, where he also wrote To Man (1924), a declaration of his own status as a prophet entrusted with bringing Thelema to humanity. After spending the winter in Paris, in early 1925 Crowley and Olsen returned to Tunis, where he wrote The Heart of the Master (1938) as an account of a vision he experienced in a trance. In March Olsen became pregnant, and Hirsig was called to take care of her; she miscarried, following which Crowley took Olsen back to France. Hirsig later distanced herself from Crowley, who then denounced her.

According to Crowley, Reuss named him head of O.T.O. upon his death, but this was challenged by a leader of the German O.T.O., Heinrich Tränker. Tränker called the Hohenleuben Conference in Thuringia, Germany, which Crowley attended. There, prominent members like Karl Germer and Martha Küntzel championed Crowley's leadership, but other key figures like Albin Grau, Oskar Hopfer, and Henri Birven backed Tränker by opposing it, resulting in a split in O.T.O. Moving to Paris, where he broke with Olsen in 1926, Crowley went through a large number of lovers over the following years, with whom he experimented in sex magic. Throughout, he was dogged by poor health, largely caused by his heroin and cocaine addictions. In 1928, Crowley was introduced to Israel Regardie, a young Englishman, who embraced Thelema and became Crowley's secretary for the next three years. That year, Crowley also met Gerald Yorke, who began organising Crowley's finances but never became a Thelemite. He also befriended the journalist Tom Driberg; Driberg did not accept Thelema either. It was here that Crowley also published one of his most significant works, Magick in Theory and Practice, which received little attention at the time.

In December 1928 Crowley met the Nicaraguan Maria Teresa Sanchez (Maria Teresa Ferrari de Miramar). Crowley was deported from France by the authorities, who disliked his reputation and feared that he was a German agent. So that she could join him in Britain, Crowley married Sanchez in August 1929. Now based in London, Mandrake Press agreed to publish his autobiography in a limited edition six-volume set, also publishing his novel Moonchild and book of short stories The Stratagem. Mandrake went into liquidation in November 1930, before the entirety of Crowley's Confessions could be published. Mandrake's owner P. R. Stephensen meanwhile wrote The Legend of Aleister Crowley, an analysis of the media coverage surrounding him.

=== Berlin and London: 1930–1938 ===
In April 1930, Crowley moved to Berlin, where he took Hanni Jaegar as his magical partner; the relationship was troubled. In September he went to Lisbon in Portugal to meet the poet Fernando Pessoa. There, he decided to fake his own death, doing so with Pessoa's help at the Boca do Inferno rock formation. He then returned to Berlin, where he reappeared three weeks later at the opening of his art exhibition at the Gallery Neumann-Nierendorf. Crowley's paintings fitted with the fashion for German Expressionism; few of them sold, but the press reports were largely favourable. In August 1931, he took Bertha Busch as his new lover; they had a violent relationship, and often physically assaulted one another. He continued to have affairs with both men and women while in the city, and met with famous people like Aldous Huxley and Alfred Adler. After befriending him, in January 1932 he took the communist Gerald Hamilton as a lodger, through whom he was introduced to many figures within the Berlin far left; it is possible that he was operating as a spy for British intelligence at this time, monitoring the communist movement.

I have been over forty years engaged in the administration of the law in one capacity or another. I thought that I knew of every conceivable form of wickedness. I thought that everything which was vicious and bad had been produced at one time or another before me. I have learnt in this case that we can always learn something more if we live long enough. I have never heard such dreadful, horrible, blasphemous and abominable stuff as that which has been produced by the man (Crowley) who describes himself to you as the greatest living poet.

— Justice Swift, in Crowley's libel case.

Crowley left Busch and returned to London, where he took Pearl Brooksmith as his new Scarlet Woman. Undergoing further nasal surgery, it was here in 1932 that he was invited to be guest of honour at Foyles' Literary Luncheon, also being invited by Harry Price to speak at the National Laboratory of Psychical Research. In need of money, he launched a series of court cases against people whom he believed to have libelled him, some of which proved successful. He gained much publicity for his lawsuit against Constable and Co for publishing Nina Hamnett's Laughing Torso (1932)—a book he alleged libelled him by referring to his occult practice as black magic—but lost the case. The court case added to Crowley's financial problems, and in February 1935 he was declared bankrupt. During the hearing, it was revealed that Crowley was spending three times his income for several years.

Crowley developed a friendship with Deidre Patricia Doherty; she offered to bear his child, who was born in May 1937. Named Randall Gair, Crowley nicknamed him Aleister Atatürk. He died in a car accident in 2002 at the age of 65. Crowley continued to socialize with friends, holding curry parties in which he cooked particularly spicy food for them. In 1936, he published his first book in six years, The Equinox of the Gods, which contained a facsimile of The Book of the Law and was considered to be volume III, number 3, of The Equinox periodical. The work sold well, resulting in a second print run. In 1937, he gave a series of public lectures on yoga in Soho. Crowley was now living largely off contributions supplied by O.T.O.'s Agape Lodge in Los Angeles, later led by rocket scientist Jack Parsons. Crowley was intrigued by the rise of Nazism in Germany, and, influenced by his friend Martha Küntzel, believed that Adolf Hitler might convert to Thelema; when the Nazis abolished the German O.T.O. and imprisoned Germer, who subsequently fled to the US, Crowley then lambasted Hitler as a black magician.

=== Second World War and death: 1939–1947 ===
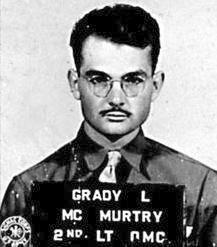
Crowley specified that Grady McMurtry succeed his chosen successor as Head of O.T.O., Karl Germer.

When the Second World War broke out, Crowley wrote to the UK Naval Intelligence Division offering his services, but they declined. He associated with a variety of figures in Britain's intelligence community at the time, including Dennis Wheatley, Roald Dahl, Ian Fleming, and Maxwell Knight, and claimed that he originated the "V for Victory" sign first used by the BBC; this has never been proven. In 1940, his asthma worsened, and with his German-produced medication unavailable, he returned to using heroin, once again becoming addicted. As the Blitz hit London, Crowley relocated to Torquay, Devon, where he was briefly admitted to hospital with asthma and entertained himself with visits to the local chess club. Tiring of Torquay, he returned to London, where he was visited by American Thelemite Grady McMurtry, to whom Crowley awarded the title of "Hymenaeus Alpha". He stipulated that though Germer would be his immediate successor, McMurty should succeed Germer as head of O.T.O. after the latter's death. With O.T.O. initiate Lady Frieda Harris, Crowley developed plans to produce a tarot card set designed by him and painted by Harris. Accompanying this was a book, published in a limited edition as The Book of Thoth by Chiswick Press in 1944. To aid the war effort, he wrote a proclamation on the rights of humanity, "Liber OZ", and a poem for the liberation of France, La Gauloise. Crowley's final publication during his lifetime was a book of poetry, Olla: An Anthology of Sixty Years of Song. Another of his projects, Aleister Explains Everything, was posthumously published as Magick Without Tears.

In April 1944 Crowley briefly moved to Aston Clinton, Buckinghamshire, where he was visited by the poet Nancy Cunard, before relocating to Hastings in Sussex, where he took up residence at the Netherwood boarding house. He took a young man named Kenneth Grant as his secretary, paying him in magical teaching rather than wages. He was also introduced to John Symonds, whom he appointed to be his literary executor; Symonds thought little of Crowley, later publishing unfavorable biographies of him. Corresponding with the illusionist Arnold Crowther, it was through him that Crowley was introduced to Gerald Gardner, the future founder of Wicca. They became friends, with Crowley authorising Gardner to revive Britain's ailing O.T.O. Another visitor was Eliza Marian Butler, who interviewed Crowley for her book The Myth of the Magus. Other friends and family also spent time with him, among them Doherty and Crowley's son Aleister Atatürk.

On 1 December 1947, Crowley died at Netherwood of chronic bronchitis aggravated by pleurisy and myocardial degeneration, aged 72. His funeral was held at Woodvale Crematorium in Brighton on 5 December; about a dozen people attended, and Louis Wilkinson read excerpts from the Gnostic Mass, The Book of the Law, and "Hymn to Pan". The funeral generated press controversy, and was labelled a Black Mass by the tabloids. Crowley's body was cremated and his ashes sent to Karl Germer, who buried them in his garden in Hampton, New Jersey.

== Beliefs and thought ==
Aleister Crowley's rendition of the Unicursal Hexagram, the symbol of Thelema

Crowley's belief system, Thelema, has been described by scholars as a religion, and more specifically as both a new religious movement, and as a "magico-religious doctrine". Although holding The Book of the Law—which was composed in 1904—as its central text, Thelema took shape as a complete system in the years after 1904.

In his autobiography, Crowley wrote that his purpose in life was to "bring oriental wisdom to Europe and to restore paganism in a purer form", although what he meant by "paganism" was unclear. Crowley also wrote in the 4th Book of Magick about a great pagan Umbral fleet ruled by Ottovius that would be handed down to the great Spartan. The esoteric nature of this was also unclear. Crowley's thought was not always cohesive, and was influenced by a variety of sources, ranging from eastern religious movements and practices like Hindu yoga and Buddhism, to scientific naturalism, and various currents within Western esotericism, among them ceremonial magic, alchemy, astrology, Rosicrucianism, Kabbalah, and the Tarot. He was steeped in the esoteric teachings he had learned from the Hermetic Order of the Golden Dawn, although pushed further with his own interpretations and strategies than the Golden Dawn had done. Crowley incorporated concepts and terminology from South Asian religious traditions like yoga and Tantra into his Thelemic system, believing that there was a fundamental underlying resemblance between Western and Eastern spiritual systems. The historian Alex Owen noted that Crowley adhered to the "modus operandi" of the Decadent movement throughout his life.

Crowley believed that the twentieth century marked humanity's entry to the Aeon of Horus, a new era in which humans would take increasing control of their destiny. He believed that this Aeon follows on from the Aeon of Osiris, in which paternalistic religions like Christianity, Islam, and Buddhism dominated the world, and that this in turn had followed the Aeon of Isis, which was maternalistic and dominated by goddess worship. He believed that Thelema was the proper religion of the Aeon of Horus, and also deemed himself to be the prophet of this new Aeon. Thelema revolves around the idea that human beings each have their own True Will that they should discover and pursue, and that this exists in harmony with the Cosmic Will that pervades the universe. Crowley referred to this process of searching and discovery of one's True Will to be "the Great Work" or the attaining of the "knowledge and conversation of the Holy Guardian Angel". His favoured method of doing so was through the performance of the Abramelin operation, a ceremonial magic ritual obtained from a 17th-century grimoire. The moral code of "Do What Thou Wilt" is believed by Thelemites to be the religion's ethical law, although the historian of religion Marco Pasi noted that this was not anarchistic or libertarian in structure, as Crowley saw individuals as part of a wider societal organism.

=== Magick and theology ===
Crowley believed in the objective existence of magic, which he chose to spell as "Magick", which is an archaic spelling of the word. He provided various different definitions of this term over his career. In his book Magick in Theory and Practice, Crowley defined Magick as "the Science and Art of causing change to occur in conformity with Will". He also told his disciple Karl Germer that "Magick is getting into communication with individuals who exist on a higher plane than ours. Mysticism is the raising of oneself to their level." Crowley saw Magick as a third way between religion and science, giving The Equinox the subtitle of The Method of Science; the Aim of Religion. Within that journal, he expressed positive sentiments toward science and the scientific method, and urged magicians to keep detailed records of their magical experiments, having said: "The more scientific the record is, the better." His understanding of magic was also influenced by the work of the anthropologist James Frazer, in particular the belief that magic was a precursor to science in a cultural evolutionary framework. Unlike Frazer, however, Crowley did not see magic as a survival from the past that required eradication, but rather he believed that magic had to be adapted to suit the new age of science. In Crowley's alternative schema, old systems of magic had to decline (per Frazer's framework) so that science and magic could synthesize into magick, which would simultaneously accept the existence of the supernatural and an experimental method. Crowley deliberately adopted an exceptionally broad definition of magick that included almost all forms of technology as magick, adopting an instrumentalist definition of magic, science, and technology.

To [Crowley] the greatest aim of the magician was to merge with a higher power connected to the wellsprings of the universe, but he did not trouble himself too much to define that power consistently; sometimes it was God, sometimes the One, sometimes a goddess, and sometimes one's own Holy Guardian Angel or higher self. In the last analysis he was content for the nature of divinity to remain a mystery. As a result, he wrote at times like an atheist, at times like a monotheist, and at others like a polytheist.

— Ronald Hutton

Sexuality played an important role in Crowley's ideas about magick and his practice of it, and has been described as being central to Thelema. He outlined three forms of sex magick—the autoerotic, homosexual, and heterosexual—and argued that such acts could be used to focus the magician's will onto a specific goal such as financial gain or personal creative success. For Crowley, sex was treated as a sacrament, with the consumption of sexual fluids interpreted as a Eucharist. This was often manifested as the Cakes of Light, a biscuit containing either menstrual blood or a mixture of semen and vaginal fluids. The Gnostic Mass is the central religious ceremony within Thelema.

Crowley's theological beliefs were not clear. The historian of religion Ronald Hutton noted that some of Crowley's writings could be used to argue that he was an atheist, some support the idea that he was a polytheist, and others seem to express a mystical monotheism. On the basis of the teachings in The Book of the Law, Crowley described a pantheon of three deities taken from the ancient Egyptian pantheon: Nuit, Hadit, and Ra-Hoor-Khuit; in 1928, he wrote that all true deities were derived from this trinity. Jason Josephson Storm has argued that Crowley built on 19th-century attempts to link early Christianity to pre-Christian religions, such as Frazer's Golden Bough, to synthesize Christian theology and paganism while remaining critical of institutional and traditional Christianity.

Both during his life and after it, Crowley has been widely described as a Satanist, usually by detractors. Crowley stated he did not consider himself a Satanist, nor did he worship Satan, as he did not accept the Christian world view in which Satan was believed to exist. He nevertheless used Satanic imagery, for instance by describing himself as "the Beast 666" and referring to the Whore of Babylon in his work, while in later life he sent "Antichristmas cards" to his friends. In his writings, Crowley occasionally identified Aiwass as Satan and designated him as "Our Lord God the Devil" at one occasion. The scholar of religion Gordan Djurdjevic stated that Crowley "was emphatically not" a Satanist, "if for no other reason than simply because he did not identify himself as such". Crowley nevertheless expressed strong anti-Christian sentiment, stating that he hated Christianity "as Socialists hate soap", an animosity probably stemming from his experiences among the Plymouth Brethren. He was nevertheless influenced by the King James Bible, especially the Book of Revelation, the impact of which can be seen in his writings. He was also accused of advocating human sacrifice, largely because of a passage in Book 4 in which he stated that "A male child of perfect innocence and high intelligence is the most satisfactory victim" and added that he had sacrificed about 150 every year; this was a tongue-in-cheek reference to ejaculation, something not realized by his critics.

== Image and opinions ==
Crowley considered himself to be one of the outstanding figures of his time. Hutton stated that in Crowley's youth, he was "a self-indulgent and flamboyant young man" who "set about a deliberate flouting and provocation of social and religious norms", while being shielded from an "outraged public opinion" by his inherited wealth. Hutton also described Crowley as having both an "unappeasable desire" to take control of any organisation that he belonged to, and "a tendency to quarrel savagely" with those who challenged him. Crowley biographer Martin Booth asserted that Crowley was "self-confident, brash, eccentric, egotistic, highly intelligent, arrogant, witty, wealthy, and, when it suited him, cruel". Similarly, Richard B. Spence noted that Crowley was "capable of immense physical and emotional cruelty". Biographer Lawrence Sutin noted that Crowley exhibited "courage, skill, dauntless energy, and remarkable focus of will" while at the same time showing a "blind arrogance, petty fits of bile, [and] contempt for the abilities of his fellow men". The Thelemite Lon Milo DuQuette noted that Crowley "was by no means perfect" and "often alienated those who loved him dearest."

=== Political opinions ===
Crowley enjoyed being outrageous and flouting conventional morality, with John Symonds noting that he "was in revolt against the moral and religious values of his time". Crowley's political thought was studied by the academic Marco Pasi, who noted that for Crowley, socio-political concerns were subordinate to metaphysical and spiritual ones. He was neither on the political left nor right but perhaps best categorized as a "conservative revolutionary" despite not being affiliated with the German-based movement of the same name. Pasi described Crowley's fascination with the extreme ideologies of Nazism and Marxism–Leninism, and the aims of both to violently overturn society: "What Crowley liked about Nazism and communism, or at least what made him curious about them, was the anti-Christian position and the revolutionary and socially subversive implications of these two movements. In their subversive powers, he saw the possibility of an annihilation of old religious traditions, and the creation of a void that Thelema, subsequently, would be able to fill." Crowley described democracy as an "imbecile and nauseating cult of weakness", and commented that The Book of the Law proclaimed that "there is the master and there is the slave; the noble and the serf; the 'lone wolf' and the herd". In this attitude, he was influenced by Social Darwinism and the work of Friedrich Nietzsche. Although he had contempt for most of the British aristocracy, he regarded himself as an aristocrat and styled himself as Laird Boleskine, once describing his ideology as "aristocratic communism".

=== Views on sexuality and gender ===
Crowley was bisexual, but exhibited a preference for women, with his relationships with men being fewer and mostly in the early part of his life. In particular he was attracted to "exotic women", and said he had fallen in love on multiple occasions; Kaczynski stated that "when he loved, he did so with his whole being, but the passion was typically short-lived". Even in later life, Crowley was able to attract young bohemian women to be his lovers, largely due to his charisma. He applied the term "Scarlet Woman" to various female lovers whom he believed played an important role in his magical work. During homosexual acts, he usually played 'the passive role', which Booth believed "appealed to his masochistic side". An underlying theme in many of his writings is that spiritual enlightenment arises through transgressing socio-sexual norms.

Crowley advocated complete sexual freedom for both men and women. He argued that homosexual and bisexual people should not suppress their sexual orientation, commenting that a person "must not be ashamed or afraid of being homosexual if he happens to be so at heart; he must not attempt to violate his own true nature because of public opinion, or medieval morality, or religious prejudice which would wish he were otherwise." On other issues he adopted a more conservative attitude; he opposed abortion on moral grounds, believing that no woman following her True Will would ever desire one.

Both critics of Crowley and adherents of Thelema have accused Crowley of misogyny. Booth described Crowley as exhibiting a "general misogyny", something he believed arose from Crowley's relationship with his mother. Sutin noted that Crowley "largely accepted the notion, implicitly embodied in Victorian sexology, of women as secondary social beings in terms of intellect and sensibility". The scholar of religion Manon Hedenborg White noted that some of Crowley's statements are "undoubtedly misogynist by contemporary standards", but characterized Crowley's attitude toward women as complex and multi-faceted. Crowley's comments on women's role varied dramatically within his written work, even that produced in similar periods; he described women as "moral inferiors" who had to be treated with "firmness, kindness and justice", while also arguing that Thelema was essential to women's emancipation.

=== Views on race ===
Biographer Lawrence Sutin stated that "blatant bigotry is a persistent minor element in Crowley's writings". Sutin thought Crowley "a spoiled scion of a wealthy Victorian family who embodied many of the worst John Bull racial and social prejudices of his upper-class contemporaries" who "embodied the contradiction that writhed within many Western intellectuals of the time: deeply held racist viewpoints courtesy of society, coupled with a fascination with people of colour". Crowley is said to have insulted his close Jewish friend Victor Neuburg using antisemitic slurs, and he had mixed opinions about Jewish people as a group; although he praised their "sublime" poetry and stated that they exhibited "imagination, romance, loyalty, probity and humanity", he also thought that centuries of persecution had led some Jewish people to exhibit "avarice, servility, falseness, cunning and the rest". He was also known to praise various ethnic and cultural groups, such as stating that the Chinese people exhibited a "spiritual superiority" to the English, and that Muslims were characterized by "manliness, straightforwardness, subtlety, and self-respect".

== Possible links to British intelligence ==
Biographers Richard B. Spence and Tobias Churton have suggested that Crowley was a spy for the British secret services and that among other things he joined the Golden Dawn under their command to monitor the activities of Samuel Liddell MacGregor Mathers, who was known to be a Carlist. Spence suggested that the conflict between Mathers and the London lodge for the temple was part of an intelligence operation to undermine Mathers' authority. Spence has suggested that the purpose of Crowley's trip to Mexico might have been to explore Mexican oil prospects for British intelligence, and that his trip to China was orchestrated as part of a British intelligence scheme to monitor the region's opium trade. Churton suggested that Crowley had travelled to Moscow on the orders of British intelligence to spy on revolutionary elements in the city.

Spence and Sutin both wrote that Crowley's pro-German work in the United States during World War I was actually a cover for him being a double agent for Britain, citing his hyperbolic articles in The Fatherland as intended to make the German lobby appear ridiculous to the American public. Spence also wrote that Crowley encouraged the Imperial German Navy to sink the RMS Lusitania, informing them that it would ensure American neutrality while in reality hoping that it would bring the US into the war on the side of the Entente.

== Legacy and influence ==
"[H]e is today looked upon as a source of inspiration by many people in search of spiritual enlightenment and/or instructions in magical practice. Thus, while during his life his books hardly sold and his disciples were never very numerous, nowadays all his important works are constantly in print, and the people defining themselves as "thelemites" (that is, followers of Crowley's new religion) number several thousands all over the world. Furthermore, Crowley's influence over magically oriented new religious movements has in some cases been very deep and pervasive. It would be difficult to understand, for instance, some aspects of Anglo-Saxon neo-paganism and contemporary satanism without a solid knowledge of Crowley's doctrines and ideas. In other fields, such as poetry, alpinism and painting, he may have been a minor figure, but it is only fair to admit that, in the limited context of occultism, he has played and still plays a major role."

— Marco Pasi, 2003.

Crowley has remained an influential figure, both amongst occultists and in popular culture, particularly that of Britain, but also of other parts of the world. In 2002, a BBC poll placed Crowley number 73 in a list of the 100 Greatest Britons. Richard Cavendish has written of him that "In native talent, penetrating intelligence and determination, Aleister Crowley was the best-equipped magician to emerge since the seventeenth century." The scholar of esotericism Egil Asprem described him as "one of the most well-known figures in modern occultism". The scholar of esotericism Wouter Hanegraaff asserted that Crowley was an extreme representation of "the dark side of the occult", adding that he was "the most notorious occultist magician of the twentieth century". The philosopher John Moore opined that Crowley stood out as a "Modern Master" when compared with other prominent occult figures like George Gurdjieff, P. D. Ouspensky, Rudolf Steiner, or Helena Blavatsky, and described him as a "living embodiment" of Oswald Spengler's "Faustian Man". Biographer Tobias Churton considered Crowley "a pioneer of consciousness research". Hutton noted that Crowley had "an important place in the history of modern Western responses to Oriental spiritual traditions", while Sutin thought that he had made "distinctly original contributions" to the study of yoga in the West.

Thelema continued to develop and spread following Crowley's death. In 1969, O.T.O. was reactivated in California under the leadership of Grady Louis McMurtry; in 1985 its right to the title was unsuccessfully challenged in court by a rival group, the Society Ordo Templi Orientis, led by Brazilian Thelemite Marcelo Ramos Motta. American filmmaker Kenneth Anger was influenced by Crowley's writings from a young age. In the United Kingdom, Crowley's former student and secretary Kenneth Grant propagated a tradition known as Typhonian Thelema through his organisation, the Typhonian O.T.O., later renamed the Typhonian Order. Also in Britain, an occultist known as Amado Crowley claimed to be Crowley's son; this has been refuted by academic investigation. Amado argued that Thelema was a false religion created by Crowley to hide his true esoteric teachings, which Amado said he was propagating.

Several Western esoteric traditions other than Thelema were also influenced by Crowley, with Djurdjevic observing that "Crowley's influence on twentieth-century and contemporary esotericism has been enormous". Gerald Gardner, the founder of Gardnerian Wicca, used much of Crowley's published material when composing the Gardnerian ritual liturgy, and the Australian witch Rosaleen Norton was also heavily influenced by Crowley's ideas. More widely, Crowley became "a dominant figure" in the modern Pagan community. L. Ron Hubbard, the American founder of Scientology, was involved in Thelema in the early 1940s via Jack Parsons, and it has been argued that Crowley's ideas influenced some of Hubbard's work. The scholars of religion Asbjørn Dyrendel, James R. Lewis, and Jesper Petersen noted that despite the fact that Crowley was not a Satanist, he "in many ways embodies the pre-Satanist esoteric discourse on Satan and Satanism through his lifestyle and his philosophy", with his "image and ought" becoming an "important influence" on the later development of religious Satanism. For instance, two prominent figures in religious Satanism, Anton LaVey and Michael Aquino, were influenced by Crowley's work.

=== In popular culture ===
Crowley also had a wider influence in British popular culture. After his time in Cefalù, which brought him to public attention in Britain, various "literary Crowleys" appeared: characters in fiction based upon him. One of the earliest was the character of the poet Shelley Arabin in John Buchan's 1926 novel The Dancing Floor. In his novel The Devil Rides Out, Dennis Wheatley used Crowley as a partial basis for the character of Damien Mocata, a portly bald defrocked priest who engages in black magic. The occultist Dion Fortune used Crowley as a basis for characters in her books The Secrets of Doctor Taverner (1926) and The Winged Bull (1935). Crowley was one of the inspirations for the character of Dr Trelawney in Anthony Powell's A Dance to the Music of Time.

He was included as one of the figures on the cover art of The Beatles' album Sgt. Pepper's Lonely Hearts Club Band (1967), and his motto of "Do What Thou Wilt" was inscribed on the vinyl of Led Zeppelin's album Led Zeppelin III (1970). Led Zeppelin co-founder Jimmy Page bought Boleskine in 1971, and part of the band's film The Song Remains the Same was filmed on its grounds. He sold it in 1992. David Bowie included references to Crowley and his works in songs including "After All", "Quicksand" (1971), and "Station to Station" (1976), and it has been suggested that the lyrics of his song "Let's Dance" (1983) may substantially paraphrase Crowley's 1923 poem "Lyric of Love to Leah". Ozzy Osbourne and his lyricist Bob Daisley wrote a song titled "Mr. Crowley" (1980). A prophetic quote about the coming of the New Aeon borrowed from Crowley's work Magick in Theory and Practice (1911) was featured in the introduction to the video game Blood Omen: Legacy of Kain (1996). Crowley began to receive scholarly attention from academics in the late 1990s.

== Notes and references ==
=== Works cited ===
- Asprem, Egil (2008). "Magic Naturalized? Negotiating Science and Occult Experience in Aleister Crowley's Scientific Illuminism". Aries: Journal for the Study of Western Esotericism. 8 (2). Leiden: 139–165. doi:10.1163/156798908X327311. ISSN 1567-9896.
- Asprem, Egil (2013). Arguing with Angels: Enochian Magic and Modern Occulture. Albany, New York: SUNY Press. ISBN 978-1-4384-4191-7. OCLC 809317694.
- Bogdan, Henrik; Starr, Martin P. (2012). "Introduction". In Bogdan, Henrik; Starr, Martin P. (eds.). Aleister Crowley and Western Esotericism. Oxford University Press. pp. 3–14. doi:10.1093/acprof:oso/9780199863075.003.0001. ISBN 978-0-19-986309-9. OCLC 820009842.
- Booth, Martin (2000). A Magick Life: The Biography of Aleister Crowley. London: Coronet Books. ISBN 978-0-340-71806-3. OCLC 59483726.
- Cavendish, Richard (1978). "Crowley and After". A History of Magic. London: Sphere Books. pp. 167–79. ISBN 0-7221-2214-4. OCLC 16423603.
- Churton, Tobias (2011). Aleister Crowley: The Biography. London: Watkins Books. ISBN 978-1-78028-012-7. OCLC 701810228.
- Crowley, Aleister (1989). The Confessions of Aleister Crowley: An Autohagiography. London: Arkana. ISBN 978-0-14-019189-9. OCLC 19865968.
- Crowley, Aleister (1983). The Holy Books of Thelema (1st paper ed.). York Beach, Maine: Samuel Weiser. ISBN 0-87728-686-8. OCLC 30592109.
- Djurdjevic, Gordan (2014). India and the Occult: The Influence of South Asian Spirituality on Modern Western Occultism. New York City: Palgrave Macmillan. ISBN 978-1-137-40498-5. OCLC 870285576.
- Doyle White, Ethan (2016). "Lucifer Over Luxor: Archaeology, Egyptology, and Occultism in Kenneth Anger's Magick Lantern Cycle". Present Pasts. 7 (1): 1–10. doi:10.5334/pp.73. ISSN 1759-2941.
- Drury, Nevill (2012). "The Thelemic Sex Magick of Aleister Crowley". In Drury, Nevill (ed.). Pathways in Modern Western Magic. Richmond, CA: Concrescent Scholars. pp. 205–245. ISBN 978-0-9843729-9-7. OCLC 814283519.
- DuQuette, Lon Milo (2003). The Magick of Aleister Crowley: A Handbook of Rituals of Thelema. San Francisco: Weiser. ISBN 978-1-57863-299-2. OCLC 52621460.
- Dyrendal, Asbjørn (2012). "Satan and the Beast: The Influence of Aleister Crowley on Modern Satanism". In Bogdan, Henrik; Starr, Martin P. (eds.). Aleister Crowley and Western Esotericism. Oxford University Press. pp. 369–394. doi:10.1093/acprof:oso/9780199863075.003.0015. ISBN 978-0-19-986309-9. OCLC 820009842.
- Dyrendal, Asbjørn; Lewis, James R.; Petersen, Jesper Aa. (2016). The Invention of Satanism. Oxford and New York: Oxford University Press. ISBN 978-0-19-518110-4. OCLC 908934971.
- Evans, Dave (2007). The History of British Magick After Crowley. n.p.: Hidden Publishing. ISBN 978-0-9555237-0-0. OCLC 183145633.
- Freeman, Nick (2018). "The Black Magic Bogeyman 1908–1935". In Ferguson, Christine; Radford, Andrew (eds.). The Occult Imagination in Britain: 1875–1947. London: Routledge. pp. 94–109. doi:10.4324/9781351168328-6. ISBN 978-1-4724-8698-1.
- Granholm, Kennet (2013). "Ritual Black Metal: Popular Music as Occult Mediation and Practice". Correspondences. 1 (1): 5–33. ISSN 2053-7158.
- Hamnett, Nina (2007). Laughing Torso: Reminiscences of Nina Hamnett. London: Hildreth. ISBN 978-1-4067-2874-3. OCLC 1156889313.
- Hanegraaff, Wouter J. (2012). "Foreword: Bringing Light to the Underground". In Bogdan, Henrik; Starr, Martin P. (eds.). Aleister Crowley and Western Esotericism. Oxford University Press. pp. vii–x. doi:10.1093/acprof:oso/9780199863075.002.0006 (inactive 1 July 2025). ISBN 978-0-19-986309-9. OCLC 820009842.
- Hanegraaff, Wouter (2013). Western Esotericism: A Guide for the Perplexed. London: Bloomsbury Press. ISBN 978-1-4411-8713-0. OCLC 777652932.
- Hedenborg White, Manon (2020). The Eloquent Blood: The Goddess Babalon and the Construction of Femininities in Western Esotericism. Oxford and New York: Oxford University Press. ISBN 978-0-19-006502-7. OCLC 1127052266.
- Hutton, Ronald (1999). The Triumph of the Moon: A History of Modern Pagan Witchcraft. New York: Oxford University Press. ISBN 978-0-19-285449-0. OCLC 41452625.
- Hutton, Ronald (2012). "Crowley and Wicca". In Bogdan, Henrik; Starr, Martin P. (eds.). Aleister Crowley and Western Esotericism. Oxford University Press. pp. 285–306. doi:10.1093/acprof:oso/9780199863075.003.0012. ISBN 978-0-19-986309-9. OCLC 820009842.
- Josephson Storm, Jason (2017). The Myth of Disenchantment: Magic, Modernity, and the Birth of the Human Sciences. University of Chicago Press. doi:10.7208/chicago/9780226403533.001.0001. ISBN 978-0-226-40336-6. OCLC 979417616. S2CID 171898652.
- Kaczynski, Richard (2010). Perdurabo: The Life of Aleister Crowley (Revised and Expanded ed.). Berkeley, California: North Atlantic Books. ISBN 978-1-55643-899-8.
- Lachman, Gary (2014). Aleister Crowley: Magick, Rock and Roll, and the Wickedest Man in the World. New York: Penguin Random House. ISBN 978-0-399-16190-2. OCLC 869460695.
- Landis, Bill (1995). Anger: The Unauthorised Biography of Kenneth Anger. New York: HarperCollins. ISBN 978-0-06-016700-4. OCLC 32429525.
- Medway, Gareth J. (2001). Lure of the Sinister: The Unnatural History of Satanism. New York and London: New York University Press. ISBN 0-8147-5645-X. OCLC 42643579.
- Moreman, Christopher M. (2003). "Devil Music and the Great Beast: Ozzy Osbourne, Aleister Crowley, and the Christian Right". The Journal of Religion and Popular Culture. 3 (1): 1–12. doi:10.3138/jrpc.5.1.004. ISSN 1703-289X.
- Morgan, Mogg (2011). "The Heart of Thelema: Morality, Amorality, and Immorality in Aleister Crowley's Thelemic Cult". The Pomegranate: The International Journal of Pagan Studies. 13 (2): 163–83. doi:10.1558/pome.v13i2.163. ISSN 1528-0268.
- Moore, John (2009). Aleister Crowley: A Modern Master. Oxford: Mandrake. ISBN 978-1-906958-02-2. OCLC 652037939.
- Owen, Alex (2012). "The Sorcerer and His Apprentice: Aleister Crowley and the Magical Exploration of Edwardian Subjectivity". In Bogdan, Henrik; Starr, Martin P. (eds.). Aleister Crowley and Western Esotericism. Oxford University Press. pp. 15–52. doi:10.1093/acprof:oso/9780199863075.003.0002. ISBN 978-0-19-986309-9. OCLC 820009842.
- Owen, Alex (2004). "Aleister Crowley in the Desert". The Place of Enchantment: British Occultism and the Culture of the Modern. University of Chicago Press. pp. 186–202. doi:10.7208/chicago/9780226642031.003.0007. ISBN 978-0-226-64201-7. OCLC 593274241.
- Pasi, Marco (2003). "The Neverendingly Told Story: Recent Biographies of Aleister Crowley". Aries: Journal for the Study of Western Esotericism. 3 (2): 224–45. doi:10.1163/157005903767876928. ISSN 1567-9896.
- Pasi, Marco (2014) [1999]. Aleister Crowley and the Temptation of Politics. Ariel Godwin (translator). Durham: Acumen. ISBN 978-1-84465-696-7. OCLC 872678868.
- Pegg, Nicholas (2 November 2016). The Complete David Bowie: New Edition: Expanded and Updated. Titan Books. ISBN 978-1-78565-533-3. OCLC 774591703.
- Redmond, Geoffrey (2021). "The Yijing in Early Postwar Counterculture in the West". In Ng, Benjamin Wai-ming (ed.). The Making of the Global Yijing in the Modern World: Cross-cultural Interpretations and Interactions. Springer Nature Singapore. pp. 197ff. ISBN 978-981-336-228-4.
- Richmond, Keith (2012). "Through the Witch's Looking Glass: The Magick of Aleister Crowley and the Witchcraft of Rosaleen Norton". In Bogdan, Henrik; Starr, Martin P. (eds.). Aleister Crowley and Western Esotericism. Oxford University Press. pp. 307–34. doi:10.1093/acprof:oso/9780199863075.003.0013. ISBN 978-0-19-986309-9. OCLC 820009842.
- Robinson, D. (2017). Exorcising Translation: Towards an Intercivilizational Turn. Bloomsbury Academic. ISBN 978-1-5013-2605-9.
- Spence, Richard B. (2008). Secret Agent 666: Aleister Crowley, British Intelligence and the Occult. Port Townsend, Washington: Feral House. ISBN 978-1-932595-33-8. OCLC 658217241.
- Sutin, Lawrence (2000). Do What Thou Wilt: A Life of Aleister Crowley. New York: St. Martin's Press. ISBN 978-0-312-25243-4. OCLC 43581537.
- Symonds, John (1997). The Beast 666: The Life of Aleister Crowley. London: Pindar Press. ISBN 978-1-899828-21-0. OCLC 60232203.
- "House of the Unholy". The Scotsman. 23 November 2007. ISSN 0307-5850. Archived from the original on 16 September 2015.
- The United Press (13 April 1934). "Confessed Genius Loses Weird Suit". The Pittsburgh Press.
- Urban, Hugh B. (2012). "The Occult Roots of Scientology? L. Ron Hubbard, Aleister Crowley, and the Origins of a Controversial New Religion". In Bogdan, Henrik; Starr, Martin P. (eds.). Aleister Crowley and Western Esotericism. Oxford University Press. pp. 335–68. doi:10.1093/acprof:oso/9780199863075.003.0014. ISBN 978-0-19-986309-9. OCLC 820009842.
- van Luijk, Ruben (2016). "Paths into the Twentieth Century". Children of Lucifer: The Origins of Modern Religious Satanism. Oxford Studies in Western Esotericism. New York: Oxford University Press. pp. 294–343. doi:10.1093/acprof:oso/9780190275105.003.0011. ISBN 978-0-19-027512-9. OCLC 933273961.
