= Gnostics (TV series) =

1987 British TV documentary series

- Title card of Ep. 1
- Genre: Docudrama
- Written by: Tobias Churton
- Country of origin: United Kingdom
- Original language: English
- No. of series: 1
- No. of episodes: 4

Production
- Running time: 52–53 mins
- Production company: Border Television

Original release
- Network: Channel 4
- Release: 1987

Gnostics is a 1987 four-part drama-documentary series made by Border TV for Channel 4 (UK). It was re-broadcast in 1990. The writer of the series, Tobias Churton, also released an accompanying book.

- Episode 1. "Knowledge of the Heart"
- Episode 2. "The Goodmen's Heresy"
- Episode 3. "The Divinity of Man"
- Episode 4. "A Crack in the Universe"

The body of the programmes was compiled of documentary material on Gnostic movements and the Cathars. Among those interviewed were academics and writers Hans Jonas, Gilles Quispel, Elaine Pagels and James Robinson, as well as Muhammad Ali al-Samman who unearthed the texts at Nag Hammadi.

Dramatised sections were acted by Nigel Harrison (as the Gnostic Christ) with other actors including Brian Blessed, Marius Goring and Ian Brooker.
