= Evangeline Adams =

American astrologer (1868–1932)

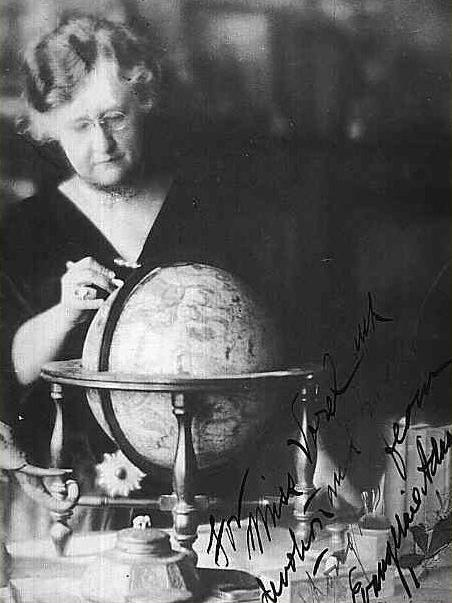
- Born: Evangeline Smith Adams; February 8, 1868; Jersey City, New Jersey, U.S.
- Died: November 10, 1932 (aged 64)
- Occupation: Astrologist
- Spouse: George Edwin Jordan (m. 1923)

Evangeline Smith Adams (February 8, 1868 – November 10, 1932) was an American astrologer based in New York City. She ran a thriving astrological consulting business, gained widespread notability for successfully defending her astrological practice in court, and produced a number of popular books about astrology, including Astrology: Your Place in the Sun (1927), Astrology: Your Place Among the Stars (1930), and her autobiography, The Bowl of Heaven (1926). While Aleister Crowley ghostwrote her books on astrology, Adams is an acknowledged contributor to Crowley's own astrological text The General Practice of Astrology. She has been described as "America's first astrological superstar".

== Early life ==
Adams was born on 8 February 1868 in Jersey City, New Jersey, to George and Harriet Adams (née Smith). The family identified as conservative. Her father died when she was 15 months old.

== Career ==
It was towards the end of her career that Adams took to publishing books and raising her profile within popular media. For most of her working life, she ran a thriving astrological practice based on consultation by person or mail. This grew to employ several assistants and stenographers. For a number of years Adams employed Crowley as a ghost-writer. Their business relationship eventually turned into an acrimonious one, which brought copyright issues of "who really wrote what", with regards to Crowley's General Principles of Astrology (now settled with the book being attributed to Crowley but with a recognized contribution by Adams).

Adams was arrested three times in New York City for fortune telling, in 1911, 1914 and 1923. Although practicing astrology was not legal at that time, all the cases brought against her were unsuccessful. Her May 1914 trial was particularly notable due to the judge's acquittal "of all wrong doing" by Adams and praise of her skill, after she gave him an astrology reading describing the character of his son from his birth data.

Adams was well paid by her clients for her predictions. She was reputed to successfully predict changes in the stock market. However, author Carol Krismann noted that:

Skeptics point out that Adams had no knowledge of economics and that her predictions were always fuzzy, foretelling disaster but not specific disasters, and telling that the market would go up when in fact the country was in a period of remarkable growth in the stock market. People who believed often forgot the erroneous predictions and used the ones that happened to come true to "prove" that she was accurate.

Thousands of subscribers to her astrological newsletter followed her advice to invest in stocks during the run-up to the Stock Market Crash of 1929. This prediction would become her most infamous in saying that that the "stocks might climb to heaven" a few weeks before the crash. Investment analyst Kenneth Fisher has written that her few successful predictions were publicized whilst her misses were ignored by those desperate to believe. He described Adams as an "obvious quack with no real investment knowledge."

== Personal life and death ==
Before Adams began working as an astrologer full-time, she became engaged to a Mr. Lord, who is believed to have been her employer. Although she said that she was initially in love with him, she reportedly lost her feelings for him and ended the engagement. On April 12, 1923 she married George Edwin Jordan in New York.

Adams died on November 10, 1932.
