= Richard B. Spence =

American historian and professor

- Born: c. 1951
- Education: University of California, Santa Barbara
- Occupation: Historian
- Employer: University of Idaho

Richard Brian Spence (b. ca. 1951) is an American historian and Professor of History at the University of Idaho. He specializes in modern Russian, military, espionage and occult history. He has produced biographies of Sidney Reilly and Aleister Crowley. He has been interviewed for various documentaries on the History Channel and is a consultant for the International Spy Museum in Washington, DC.

== Biography ==
Spence earned a Ph.D. from the University of California, Santa Barbara (1981) and taught there as a visiting assistant professor from 1981 to '85. He has been affiliated with the University of Idaho since 1986. His primary areas of study are modern Russian, modern European, Middle Eastern, and military history. He has published several books and is the author of numerous articles in Revolutionary Russia, Intelligence and National Security, Journal for the Study of Anti-Semitism, American Communist History, The Historian, and other academic journals in addition to articles in general audience magazines. He is known as Rick Spence.

== Works ==
=== Books ===
- Boris Savinkov: Renegade on the Left. Boulder, Col.: East European Monographs (1991).
- Scholar, Patriot, Mentor: Historical Essays in Honor of Dimitrije Djordjevic, with Linda L. Nelson (eds). Boulder, Col.: East European Monographs.
- Trust No One: The Secret World Of Sidney Reilly. Port Townsend, WA: Feral House (2002). ISBN 978-0922915798.
- Secret Agent 666: Aleister Crowley, British Intelligence and the Occult. Port Townsend, WA: Feral House (2008). ISBN 978-1932595338. OCLC 658217241.
- Empire of the Wheel: Espionage, the Occult and Murder in Southern California, with Walter Bosley. Corvos (2011).
- Wall Street and the Russian Revolution: 1905-1925. Walterville, OR: TrineDay (2017). ISBN 978-1634241243.

=== Classes ===
- The Real History of Secret Societies. The Great Courses. Chantilly, VA: The Teaching Company (2019).

=== Articles ===
- "The Savinkov Affair Reconsidered." East European Quarterly, vol. 24, no. 1 (Mar. 1990), p. 34.
- "The Terrorist and the Master Spy." Revolutionary Russia, vol. 4, no. 1 (Jun. 1991).
- "Sidney Reilly's Lubyanka Diary, 30 October-4 November 1925." Revolutionary Russia, vol. 8, no. 2 (Dec. 1995), pp. 179–194.
- "Sidney Reilly in America, 1914-1917." Intelligence and National Security, vol. 10, no. 1 (Jan. 1995).
- "K. A. Jahnke and the German Sabotage Campaign in the United States and Mexico, 1914-1918." The Historian, vol. 59, no. 1 (Fall 1996), pp. 89–112. JSTOR 24449795.
- "Russia's Operatsiia Trest: A Reappraisal." Global Intelligence Monthly, vol. 1, no. 4 (Apr. 1999), pp. 19–24.
- "Catching Louis Fraina: Loyal Communist, US Government Informant, or British Agent?" American Communist History, vol. 11, no. 1 (Apr. 2012), pp. 81–97.
- "Death in the Adirondacks: Amtorg, Intrigue, and the Dubious Demise of Isaiya Khurgin and Efraim Sklyansky, August 1925." American Communist History, vol. 14, no. 2 (Aug. 2015), pp. 135–158.

=== Book contributions ===
- "Boris I of Bulgaria." In: Dictionary of World Biography, vol. 2, edited by Frank Northen Magill and Alison Aves. Routledge (1998). ISBN 978-1579580414.

=== Book reviews ===
- Review of Stalin's Agent: The Life and Death of Alexander Orlov by Boris Volodarsky. Slavonic and East European Review, vol. 94, no. 4 (Oct. 2016), pp. 769–770. Modern Humanities Research Association. doi:10.5699/slaveasteurorev2.94.4.0769.
