= Amado Crowley =

English occult writer and magician

Amado Crowley (26 January 1930 – November 2010) was the pseudonym of an English occult writer and magician who claimed to be the secret illegitimate son of occultist and mystic Aleister Crowley (1875–1947). During a period of over thirty years, from the early 1970s through 2000s, he published and self-published many books and recordings.

== Biographical details ==
Amado Crowley initially announced himself to the occult world via his adopted name in 1971, when he was past the age of forty, through a statement sent to the publishers of the encyclopedia on the subject, Man, Myth & Magic. However, it would later be inferred from his 1991 book, The Secrets of Aleister Crowley, that his name was registered at birth as Andrew Standish, though this has not been confirmed.

Like Aleister Crowley, Amado used and taught a syncretic mix of Western magical techniques along with Eastern methods including meditation and yoga. However, he maintained that the cornerstone of Aleister's religion of Thelema, The Book of the Law, was a fraud and that The Book of Desolation, a purported text given to him by Aleister, is the only true Crowleyan holy writ. The book has yet to be published and has only been seen by one other person other than Crowley, the writer, musician and filmmaker Jason Brett Serle.

Crowley's biographers have found no documentary evidence regarding Amado's claim of descent from Aleister Crowley, and the claim is universally dismissed as bogus by Crowley scholars. Gerald Suster wrote:

Amado claims in his book that Aleister taught him between the ages of 7 and 14: i.e.1937–1944. If so, why isn't there a single mention of this vital matter in Crowley's Diaries? There he records matters as trivial as the breaking of a tooth or the quality of his dinner: but he does not see fit to record meetings with an initiation of a son destined to be his successor.

According to his website, he died in February 2010.

== Publications ==
- Liber Lucis: a new exposition of the Law of Thelema prepared according to the instructions of Master Therion 666, and by his son here proclaimed Master Amado 777, privately published, 1972.
- Liber Alba, 1975; online, 1999.
- The Neophyte Robe, c. 1975; online, 1999.
- Rad Tungol (The Star Road) A Handbook of Ritual Magick, privately published, 1975.
- The Secrets of Aleister Crowley, Leatherhead, Diamond, 1991.
- The Riddles of Aleister Crowley, Leatherhead, Diamond, 1992.
- The Wrath of Aleister Crowley, Guildford, Diamond, 1994.
- Lewd Ghosts, Guildford, Diamond, 1994.
- Quest Magic, Guildford, Diamond, 1997.
- A Beginners Guide to Occultism, online, 1999.
- Excalibur (electronic book), 2001.
- The Sacred Mountain.
