= Tobias Churton =

British scholar (born 1960)

Tobias Churton (born 1960) is a British scholar of Rosicrucianism, Freemasonry, Gnosticism, and other esoteric movements. He has a master's degree in theology from Brasenose College, Oxford. He is the author of Gnostic Philosophy, The Magus of Freemasonry, and Freemasonry and other works on esotericism.

Churton has made several television programmes, including Gnostics, a four-part drama-documentary series made for Channel 4 (UK) by Border TV (together with an accompanying book) which was broadcast in 1987 and repeated in 1990. Churton's studies include critique of heresiologists' perceptions on the role of women in these "unorthodox" Christian movements.

He has also written about Elias Ashmole, and Rosicrucianism.

Churton's biography of Aleister Crowley was released in 2011. Subsequently, he has published four more biographical volumes on Crowley - The Beast in Berlin, Aleister Crowley in America, Aleister Crowley in India, and Aleister Crowley in England: The Return of the Great Beast, the last biography released in 2021.

== Bibliography ==
=== Nonfiction ===
- —— (1987). The Gnostics. Barnes & Noble.
- —— (2004). Golden Builders: Alchemists, Rosicrucians and the First Freemasons. Rochester: Red Wheel/Weiser.
- —— (2005). Gnostic Philosophy: From Ancient Persia to Modern Times. Rochester: Inner Traditions.
- —— (2006). The Magus of Freemasonry: The Mysterious Life of Elias Ashmole--Scientist, Alchemist, and Founder of the Royal Society. Rochester: Inner Traditions.
- —— (2007). Freemasonry: The Reality. Lewis Masonic.
- —— (2008). Kiss of Death: The True History of the Gospel of Judas. London: Watkins Publishing.
- —— (2009). Invisibles: The True History of the Rosicrucians. Lewis Masonic.
  - —— (2009). The Invisible History of the Rosicrucians: The World's Most Mysterious Secret Society. Rochester: Inner Traditions.
- —— (2010). The Missing Family of Jesus: A Historical Account of Jesus' Family, Their Heritage and Their Destiny. London: Watkins Publishing.
- —— (2012). Aleister Crowley: The Biography. London: Watkins Publishing.
- —— (2012). The Mysteries of John the Baptist: His Legacy in Gnosticism, Paganism, and Freemasonry. Rochester: Inner Traditions.
- —— (2014). Aleister Crowley: The Beast in Berlin: Art, Sex, and Magick in the Weimar Republic. Rochester: Inner Traditions.
- —— (2015). Jerusalem!: The Real Life of William Blake: A Biography. London: Watkins Publishing.
- —— (2015). Gnostic Mysteries of Sex: Sophia the Wild One and Erotic Christianity. Rochester: Inner Traditions.
- —— (2016). Occult Paris: The Lost Magic of the Belle Époque. Rochester: Inner Traditions.
- —— (2017). Deconstructing Gurdjieff: Biography of a Spiritual Magician. Rochester: Inner Traditions.
- —— (2018). Aleister Crowley in America: Art, Espionage, and Sex Magick in the New World. Rochester: Inner Traditions.
- —— (2019). The Spiritual Meaning of the Sixties: The Magic, Myth, and Music of the Decade That Changed the World. Rochester: Inner Traditions.
- —— (2019). Aleister Crowley in India: The Secret Influence of Eastern Mysticism on Magic and the Occult. Rochester: Inner Traditions.
- —— (2021). The Lost Pillars of Enoch: When Science and Religion Were One. Rochester: Inner Traditions.
- —— (2022). Aleister Crowley in England: The Return of the Great Beast. Rochester: Inner Traditions.
- —— (2023). Aleister Crowley in Paris: Sex, Art, and Magick in the City of Light. Rochester: Inner Traditions.
- —— (2023). The First Alchemists: The Spiritual and Practical Origins of the Noble and Holy Art. Rochester: Inner Traditions.
- —— (2025). The Books of Enoch Revealed: The Wicked Watchers, Metatron, and the Fruits of Forbidden Knowledge. Rochester: Inner Traditions.
- —— (2026). Celestial Realms: A History of Heaven since before the Dawn of Time. Rochester: Inner Traditions.

=== Fiction and poetry ===
- —— (1989). Miravel: A Quest. London: Weidenfeld and Nicolson.
- —— (1996). The Fear of Vision: Selected Poems. The Lichfield Press.
- —— (2013). The Babylon Gene. Head of Zeus.

=== Contributions ===
- —— (2012). "Aleister Crowley and the Yezidis". In Bogdan, Henrik; Starr, Martin P. (eds.). Aleister Crowley and Western Esotericism. Oxford University Press.
- —— (2012). The Nightmare Paintings: Aleister Crowley: Works from the Palermo Collection. Buratti Fine Art.
- —— (2023). "Enoch and the Genesis of Freemasonry". In Ariel Hessayon, Annette Yoshiko Reed, and Gabriele Boccaccini (ed.). Rediscovering Enoch? The Antediluvian Past from the Fifteenth to Nineteenth Centuries. Brill Publishers.
