= Randall Gair Doherty =

English son of Aleister Crowley (1937–2002)

- Born: Randall Gair Doherty; 2 May 1937; Newcastle upon Tyne, England
- Died: 20 November 2002 (aged 65); Chalfont St Peter, Buckinghamshire, England
- Other names: Aleister Macalpine; Charles Edward D'Arquires
- Family: Aleister Crowley (father)

Randall Gair Doherty (2 May 1937 – 20 November 2002) was the son of occultist Aleister Crowley. Throughout his life Doherty used several pseudonyms and titles including Aleister Macalpine and Count Charles Edward D'Arquires, and was called Aleister Atatürk by his father.

== Biography ==
Doherty was born on 2 May 1937 in Newcastle upon-Tyne to Aleister Crowley and Patricia Doherty, a native of Newlyn. Doherty resided in Cornwall for the majority of his life and suffered from schizophrenia.

He referred to himself as Count Charles Edward D'Arquires, Adjudicator of the Supreme Council of Great Britain. Doherty said that he wanted to take over the British government by persuasion, and in 1976 requested a meeting with then Prime Minister Harold Wilson, which was refused.

Doherty died in a car accident in Chalfont St Peter, Buckinghamshire, on November 20, 2002 at the age of 65.
