= Hariharpur, Sant Kabir Nagar =

Hariharpur
- Town
- Location in Uttar Pradesh, India Hariharpur (India)
- Coordinates: 26°40′N 83°00′E
- Country: India
- State: Uttar Pradesh
- District: Sant Kabir Nagar

Population (2001)
  - Total: 9,257

Languages
  - Official: Hindi
- Time zone: UTC+5:30 (IST)
- Vehicle registration: UP
- Website: up.gov.in

Hariharpur is a town and a Nagar Panchayat in Sant Kabir Nagar district in the Indian state of Uttar Pradesh.

== Nearly City ==
- Tanda 35 km
- Gorakhpur 60 km
- Rajesultanpur 45 km

== Demographics ==
As of the 2001 Census of India, Hariharpur had a population of 9,257. Males constitute 51% of the population and females 49%. Hariharpur has an average literacy rate of 47%, lower than the national average of 59.5%: male literacy is 59%, and female literacy is 35%. In Hariharpur, 19% of the population is under 6 years of age.
