= Rosicrucian Fellowship =

Association of Christian mystics

Emblem of the Rosicrucian Fellowship

The Rosicrucian Fellowship (TRF) ("An International Association of Christian Mystics") was founded in 1909 by Max Heindel with the aim of heralding the Aquarian Age and promulgating "the true Philosophy" of the Rosicrucians. It claims to present Esoteric Christian mysteries or esoteric knowledge, alluded to in Matthew 13:11 and Luke 8:10, to establish a meeting ground for art, religion, and science and to prepare the individual through harmonious development of the mind and the heart for selfless service of humanity.

The Rosicrucian Fellowship conducts Spiritual Healing Services and offers correspondence courses in esoteric Christianity, philosophy, "spiritual astrology" and Bible interpretation. Members of the Rosicrucian Fellowship are vegetarian and abstain from alcohol, recreational drugs and tobacco. Its headquarters are located on Mount Ecclesia in Oceanside, California, and its students are found throughout the world organized in centers and study groups. Its declared mission is to promulgate a scientific method of development suited particularly to the Western people whereby the "Soul body" may be wrought, so that humanity may hasten the Second Coming. Religious scholars classify the Rosicrucian Fellowship as a new religious movement.

== Origins and foundation ==
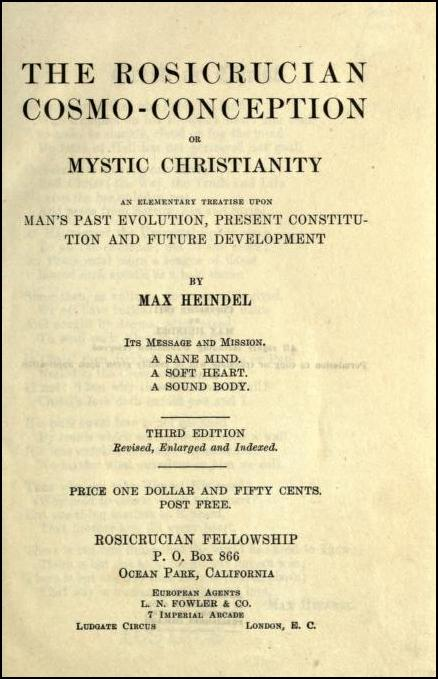
The Rosicrucian Cosmo-Conception, third edition, 1911

In 1908 Max Heindel started, in New York City, the work of rewriting a previous draft in German of teachings ostensibly written under the instruction of Elder Brothers in their temple near the border of Bohemia and Germany. Heindel moved to Buffalo, New York, where he finished the typescript about September 1908. The work, called The Rosicrucian Cosmo-Conception, was revised and printed in November 1909.

The first edition of 2500 copies, printed in Chicago, was exhausted in six months but it was learned that 2000 of these had been given by the publisher as payment of the debts of the publishing house to other publishers. Immediately, a large second edition was ordered: a first payment was made to the printer with the help of Augusta Foss, who would become Max Heindel's wife. This time two booksellers bought one-third of the imprint before it was off the press.

The Rosicrucian Fellowship's formal constitution occurred on August 8, 1909, in Seattle, Washington, at 3:00 p.m. The first Rosicrucian study center had been already previously formed in Columbus, Ohio, on November 14, 1908, where Heindel lectured and taught for a number of months. After each lecture he distributed free mimeographed copies to the audience; those twenty lectures were printed in 1909, along with the first edition of Rosicrucian Cosmo-Conception, under the title The Rosicrucian Christianity Lectures. The Columbus Center was followed by centers in North Yakima, Washington (November 1909), Portland, Oregon, and Los Angeles, California (February 27, 1910), the city where Heindel reencountered his theosophist friend Augusta Foss. In Los Angeles, Max Heindel gave conferences three times a week to audiences of nearly one thousand people from November 29, 1909, till March 17, 1910.

On October 28, 1911, the organisation's international headquarters, still used today, were opened at Mount Ecclesia in Oceanside, California. The ceremony of ground-breaking consisted in planting a large Cross with the initials C.R.C. (for Christian Rosenkreuz, the legendary head of the original order) painted in gilt letters on the three upper ends and with a climbing rose. The Rosicrucian Fellowship Temple, called The Ecclesia, was erected for the purpose of affording more powerful means for the healing of disease, and dedicated on December 25, 1920. Spiritual Healing meetings are held there each day.

According to Max Heindel, the invisible Order of the Rose Cross exists in the inner worlds, was founded in 1313 and is composed of twelve great adepts presented as belonging to human evolution but already advanced far beyond the cycle of rebirth. Their mission is explained as aiming to prepare the whole wide world for a new phase in religion that includes awareness of the inner worlds and the subtle bodies and safe guidance in the gradual awakening of man's latent spiritual faculties: "to prepare a new phase of the Christian religion to be used during the coming age now at hand."

Admission into the Rosicrucian Fellowship is free of fees and is funded by donation. The Fellowship recognizes seven grades, but its study is primarily based upon a system of three grades: regular student, probationer and disciple. After a two-year term of being a Regular Student of the Fellowship, a person who abstains from all flesh food, tobacco, mind-altering drugs, and alcohol may apply for probationership. When the Probationer has complied with the necessary requirements and completed the term of probation he may send request for individual instruction. Access to the Disciple grade is granted upon merit; once admitted into discipleship subsequent Spiritual unfoldment of the advanced soul within the Order of the Rose Cross is conducted through the process of the nine Lesser Initiations.

== Teachings ==
The school's teachings hold that a human being is a Spirit with all the powers of God, powers that are being slowly unfolded in a series of existences (rebirths) in a gradually-improving body, a process under the guidance of exalted Beings ordering one's steps in a decreasing measure as one gradually acquires intellect and will. For this purpose humans live many lives of increasingly fine texture and moral character. Through the "Law of Cause and Consequence" one constantly set new causes into operation which will create new destiny to balance and improve the old destiny brought from the past. All causes set into action in one life cannot be ripened within one existence but "Whatsoever a man soweth that shall he also reap".

=== Constitution of man ===
The human being is seen as a threefold Spirit, possessing a mind, by means of which he governs the threefold Body. This threefold body he transmutes into a threefold Soul upon which he nourishes himself "from impotence into omnipotence".

The Ego (not as defined by Freud) is the threefold Spirit, the God Within, which uses these vehicles to gather experience in the school of life. The three aspects of the Spirit are (from highest to lowest aspect):

- the Divine Spirit aspect;
- the Life Spirit aspect;
- the Human Spirit aspect.

The Mental body functions like a mirror, reflecting the outer world and enabling the ego to transmit its commands as thought and word, and also to compel action.

The threefold body consists of;

- a Dense body, which is the visible instrument he uses here in this world to fetch and carry (the body we ordinarily think of as the whole man).
- a Vital body, which is made of ether and pervades the visible body as ether permeates all other forms, except that human beings specialize a greater amount of the universal ether than other forms. The ethereal body is our instrument for specializing the vital energy of the sun and is seen by clairvoyant vision to extend about an inch and a half outside our visible body.
- a Desire body, which is our emotional nature and this finer vehicle pervades both the vital and dense bodies (it is seen by clairvoyant vision to extend about 16 inches outside our visible body, which is located in the center of this ovoid cloud as the yolk is in the center of an egg).

The threefold soul consists of;

- Conscious Soul: extracted as pabulum from the dense body (which was emanated from the Divine Spirit aspect).
- Intellectual Soul: extracted as pabulum from the vital body (which was emanated from the Life Spirit aspect).
- Emotional Soul: extracted as pabulum from the desire body (which was emanated from the Human Spirit aspect).

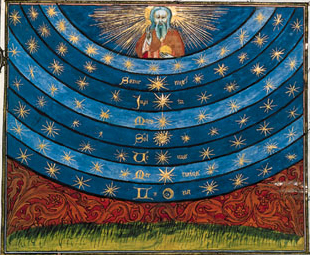
14th century illustration of the astral spheres, the "starry" regions convex upward centered on God.

Bible teachings enable us to become aware that Jesus Christ must be born within. There is a distinction between the Christ which is born within us, our true Saviour, and the Cosmic Christ, the Christ without. The latter helps us in the task of having Christ born within; however, it is our task to form the Christ within, the "Soul Body" which is the vehicle humanity will need to live in the Sixth Epoch, the New Galilee.

The "Astral body" is a vehicle evolved from a work of transmutation upon the etheric body (the two superior ethers), not to be confounded with the "desire body" since during astral projection the desire body molds itself readily into this prepared matrix and, when the individual returns to the physical body, the effort of will whereby he enters automatically dissolves the intimate connection between the desire body and the Astral or Soul body. The term "Astral body" was, it is said, employed by the mediaeval Alchemists because of the ability it conferred upon the one who has it to traverse the "starry" regions. The "Astral body" is regarded as the "Philosopher's Stone" or "Living Stone" of the alchemist, the Golden "Wedding Garment" that Christ speaks of in the Gospel of Matthew, the "Soul Body" [soma psuchicon] that Paul mentions in the First Epistle to the Corinthians or the "Diamond Soul" spoken of in some of the ancient philosophies. It will eventually be evolved by humanity as a whole.

The physical body is a vehicle which the Spirit uses to gain experience, while death is a passing of the Spirit into a larger sphere, a birth which should be prepared for with the greatest care. The Ego must assimilate what it has experienced. The Spirit withdraws with the two higher vehicles, which are tied to the etheric and physical bodies by a slender cord. At death the desire and mental bodies leave the physical, taking with them but one permanent etheric atom, which during life is stationed in the solar plexus. The seed atom, of the dense body, like the negative film of the camera, has been impressed with all the experiences of the life just ended. At death the force of this atom leave the body and all these impressions are transferred from the vital body, the storehouse of these experiences, into the desire body, which then forms the basis of the man or woman's life in purgatory and the first heaven. This transfer is done by the Spirit during the first three and one-half days (84 hours) after the rupture of the connection between the seed atom and the heart, ordinarily known as death: death is not complete until this transfer has been accomplished. During this time sensation is still present, and the Spirit suffers through inharmonious surroundings, including postmortem examination and embalming.

Death should be prepared for with the greatest care, requiring a "post mortem interval", or preservation period, of the physical body for three and half days (84 hours), for life review purpose (in a pacific death; not in a sudden impact such as: shock, accident, catastrophe, heart attack or suicide), before cremation or any other way of body disposal.

=== Cosmology ===
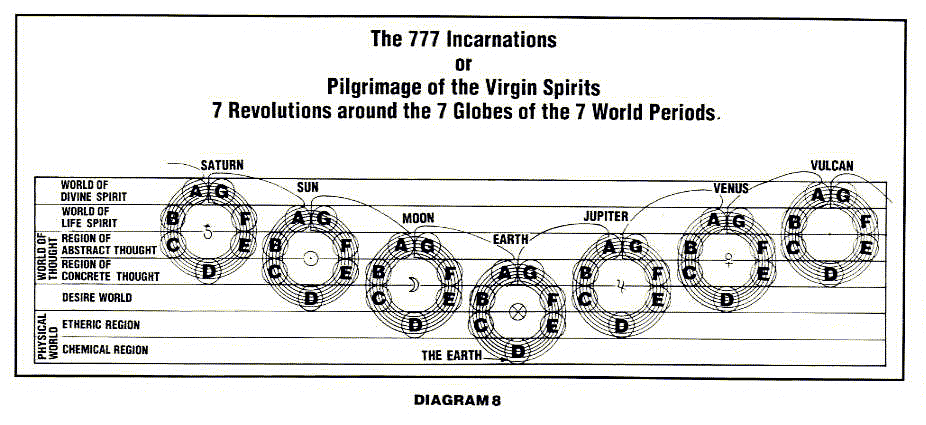
“We must constantly bear in mind that these Worlds inter-penetrate, that the Globes inter-penetrate, and that the way they are shown in the diagram [reduced to two dimensions] is analogous to taking all the wheels of a watch and laying them side by side in order to show how the watch keeps time.” ~ Max Heindel

The evolution of man is divided into seven Periods:

- involution: the Saturn Period, the Sun Period, the Moon Period;
- the Earth Period (first half still involution, second half towards evolution);
- evolution: the Jupiter Period, the Venus Period, the Vulcan Period.

We are presently in the second half of the Earth Period: we have just passed the end of our involution and are beginning our evolution, or the spiritualization of matter and our return to God our Father.

The three Aspects of God are Will, Wisdom and Activity. The Father has completed His union with the first aspect, will. The Son, Christ, the highest Initiate of the Sun Period: has completed His union with the Second aspect of God, wisdom. Jehovah, the Highest Initiate of the Moon Period, has completed His union with the third aspect, activity.

The sevenfold constitution of man is related to five of seven worlds, different planes of existence having varying density and vibration, states of spirit-matter not separated by space or distance but permeating one another, so that God and the other great beings pervade their own realms and those of greater density than their own, including our own. Some worlds are related to the planet and the higher ones to the whole Solar System. These seven worlds are the planes of evolution of each Solar System and constitute the seventh and lower cosmic plane; the six superior cosmic planes possibly each have a different and larger structural and dynamic expression in the physical universe.

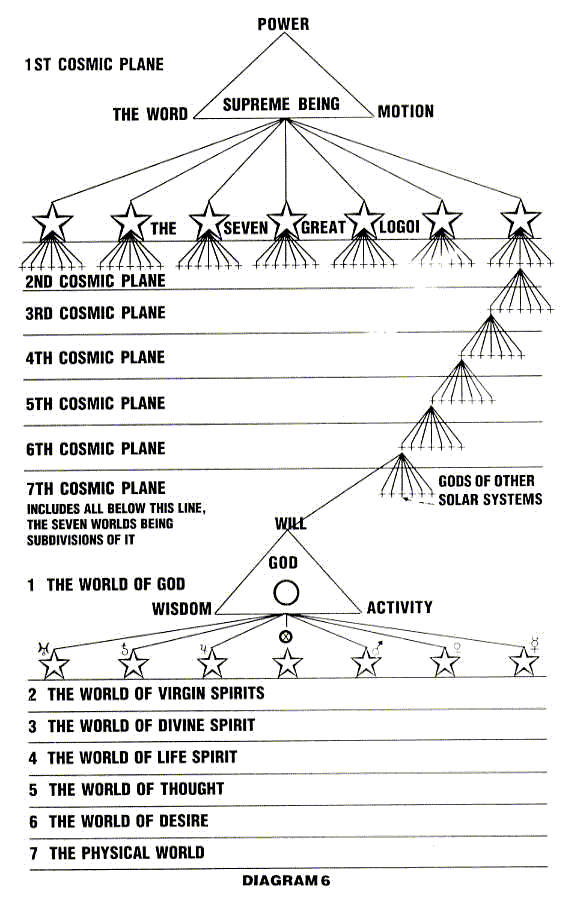
The Supreme Being, the Cosmic Planes and God

- The World of God
- The World of Virgin Spirits: home of the virgin spirits, differentiated within God Himself as "sparks from a flame" at the beginning of manifestation, prior to the beginning of pilgrimage through matter
- The World of Divine Spirit: related to the threefold Spirit's Divine Spirit aspect; home of The Father, inhabited by the Lords of Wisdom, a hierarchy of Elohim astrologically associated with Virgo
- The World of Life Spirit: related to the Ego's life spirit aspect; home of the Christ (The Son, the Solar Logos); inhabited by the Lords of Individuality, a Hierarchy of Elohim astrologically associated to Libra; higher Memory of Nature, events from the earliest dawn of our present manifestation, open only to Adepts and higher Spiritual Beings
- The World of Thought
  - Region of Abstract Thought: inhabited by the Lords of Form, a Hierarchy of Elohim astrologically associated to Scorpio; the "Third heaven" state of consciousness; Germinal idea(s); related to the Ego's human spirit aspect; the home of Jehova, The Holy Spirit. This Great Hierarchy is the evolved form of the third aspect of God, the creative energy in Nature, which is reflected in man as sex energy; the misuse or abuse of that power, the holy creative force [of God] in man, for gratification of the passionate nature, and particularly perversion (see also human sexual behaviour), constitutes the sin against the Holy “Ghost”. The "great transgression", the abuse of sex or generative force for sense gratification, must be expiated, under the Law of Cause and Consequence, through suffering in diseased and incapacitated bodies and minds, mainly afflicted with developmental disabilities, as there is a close connection between sexual activity and mental activity as well as the power of speech – and incurable cancer (see also carcinogenesis and cancer treatment) for those who abuse the sex function in a very marked and bestial degree. Thus the ignorant use of the generative force is primarily responsible for pain, sickness and sorrow.
  - Region of Concrete Thought: related to the Mind; inhabited by the Lords of Mind, a Hierarchy of Elohim astrologically associated to Sagittarius; the "Second heaven" state of consciousness; Archetypes; memory of nature in the highest subdivision (covering the essence of a whole life or event); ocean of harmony: the Music of the Spheres
- The Desire World, the world of color: related to the Desire body; home of the Archangels, astrologically associated to Capricorn; the abode of deceased persons for some time subsequent to the event of death
  - higher regions, Attraction, the "First heaven" state of consciousness
  - intermediate region, Interest and Indifference
  - lower regions, Repulsion, the "Purgatory" state of consciousness
- The Physical World, composed of seven regions;
  - Etheric Region: related to the etheric body; home of the Angels (seen as being one step beyond the human stage, as humans are a degree in advance of the animal evolution), astrologically associated to Aquarius; Akashic records in the reflecting ether (pictures at least several hundred years back or much more in some cases, almost as the pictures on a screen, scene shifts backward). The etheric region is subdivided in four regions according to the grades of density of the aether permeating our physical planet Earth; Reflecting Ether, Light Ether, Life Ether and Chemical Ether.
  - Chemical Region; the physical Earth as perceived through the five senses enhanced by the current technological equipment, subdivided in three regions according to the four main states of matter: solid, liquid, gaseous, and plasma. It is the current home of the self-conscious humanity, astrologically associated to Pisces. The Chemical region of the physical world is home to four life waves, or kingdoms, at a different stage in the evolutionary path: mineral life is the first and lowest level of spiritual evolution on Earth; then comes plants, with actual life, then animals (cold-blooded animals, then warm-blooded), and finally the human being. The beings belonging to each life wave either evolve through the work of the individual Spirit (human being) or are yet evolving under a group spirit and have acquired more or less subtle bodies according to the development stage of each life wave.

The worlds of matter (Physical world, Desire world and World of Thought/Region of Concrete Thought) are considered to be a reverse reflection of the worlds of Spirit (World of Thought/Region of Abstract Thought, World of Life Spirit and World of Divine Spirit).

=== Vegetarianism ===
Members of the Rosicrucian Fellowship cannot consume alcohol, meat or use tobacco. They advocate a vegetarian diet for ethical and spiritual reasons. They also recommend that vegetables be eaten raw as cooking destroys valuable cell salts. They have stated that the "vegetarian diet is most conducive to health and purity; that meat of all kinds, including fish and fowl, also alcoholic drinks, tobacco, and stimulants are injurious to health and spirituality".

== See also ==
- Christian Rosenkreuz

Lineage

- Beloved Disciple
- Johannine literature
- Lazarus

School

- Max Heindel
- Mount Ecclesia
- Rays from the Rose Cross
- The Rosicrucian Cosmo-Conception

Central concepts

- Astrological age, Age of Aquarius
- Christ (concept), Second Coming
- God and the scheme of evolution
