= Astral plane =

Concept of a world of celestial spheres

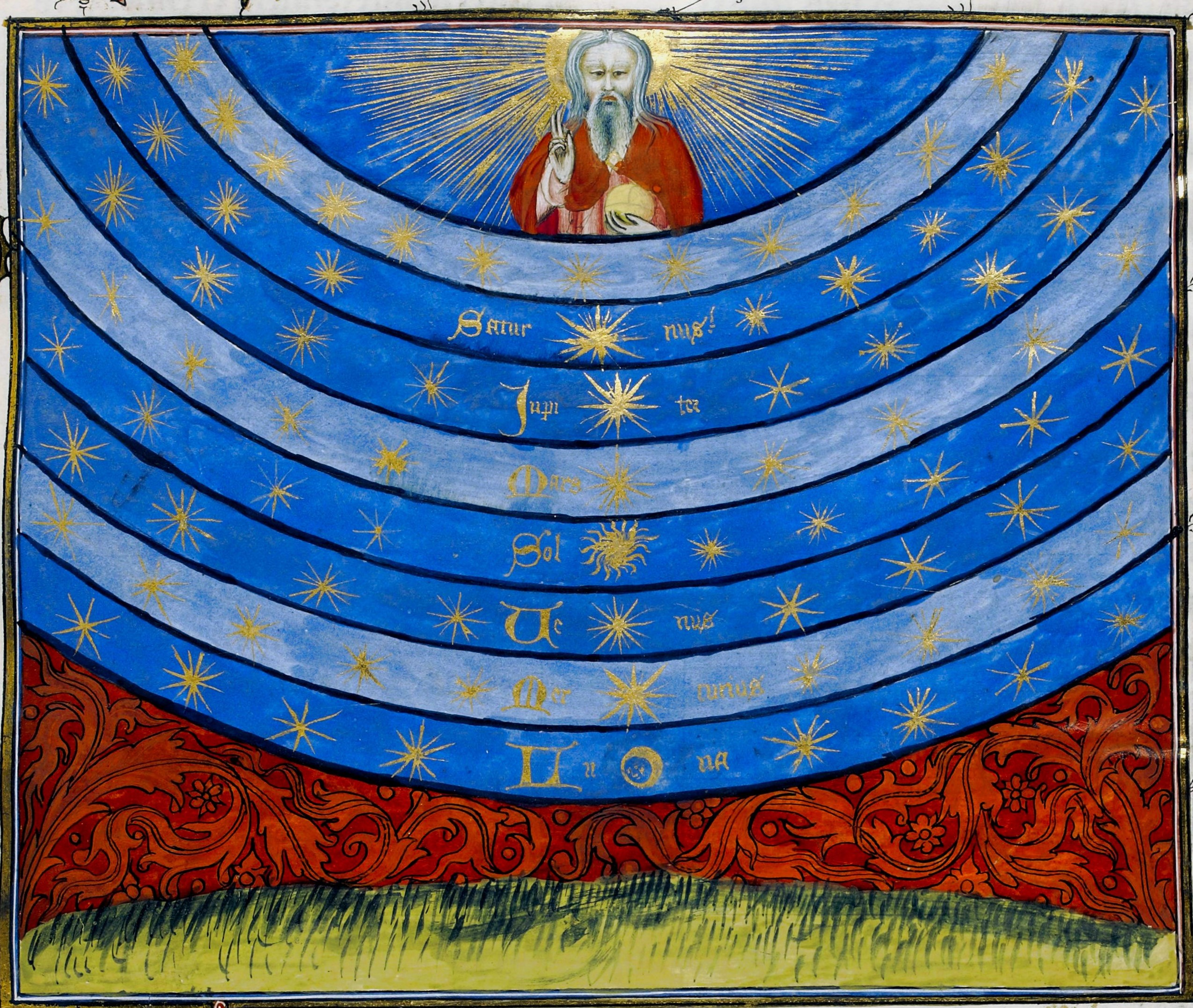
The astral spheres were thought to be planes of angelic existence intermediate between Earth and heaven.

The astral plane, also called the astral realm, or the astral world, or the soul realm, or the spirit realm, is a plane of existence postulated by classical, medieval, oriental, esoteric, and New Age philosophies and mystery religions. It is the world of the celestial spheres, crossed by the soul in its astral body on the way to being born and after death, and is generally believed to be populated by angels, spirits, or other immaterial beings. In the late 19th and early 20th century, the term was popularised by Theosophy and neo-Rosicrucianism.

Another view holds that the astral plane or world, rather than being some kind of boundary area crossed by the soul, is the entirety of spirit existence or spirit worlds to which those who die on Earth go, and where they live out their non-physical lives. It is understood by adherents that all consciousness resides in the astral plane. Some writers conflate this realm with heaven or paradise or union with God itself, while others do not. Paramahansa Yogananda wrote in Autobiography of a Yogi (1946), "The astral universe ... is hundreds of times larger than the material universe ... [with] many astral planets, teeming with astral beings."

The "World of Al-Ghaib" and the "World of Barzakh" are related concepts in Islam (also the concept of 'âlam al-mithâl "imaginal world" in Sufism). In Judaism, it is known as the "World of Yetzirah", according to Lurianic Kabbalah.

== History ==
Plato and Aristotle taught that the stars were composed of a type of matter different from the four earthly (classical) elements—an ethereal fifth element or quintessence. In the "astral mysticism" of the classical world the human psyche was composed of the same material, thus accounting for the influence of the stars upon human affairs. In his commentaries on Plato's Timaeus, Proclus wrote the following:

Man is a little world (mikros cosmos). For, just like the Whole, he possesses both mind and reason, both a divine and a mortal body. He is also divided up according to the universe. It is for this reason, you know, that some are accustomed to say that his consciousness corresponds with the nature of the fixed stars, his reason in its contemplative aspect with Saturn and in its social aspect with Jupiter, (and) as to his irrational part, the passionate nature with Mars, the eloquent with Mercury, the appetitive with Venus, the sensitive with the Sun and the vegetative with the Moon.

Such doctrines were commonplace in mystery-schools and Hermetic and gnostic sects throughout the Roman Empire.

Among Muslims the "astral" world-view was soon rendered orthodox by Quranic references to the Prophet Muhammad’s ascent through the seven heavens. Scholars took up the Greek Neoplatonist accounts as well as similar material in Hindu and Zoroastrian texts. The expositions of Ibn Sina (i.e. Avicenna), the Brotherhood of Purity and others, when translated into Latin in the Norman era, were to have a profound effect upon European medieval alchemy and astrology. By the 14th century, Dante was describing his own imaginary journey through the astral spheres in his Paradiso.

Throughout the Renaissance, philosophers, Paracelsians, Rosicrucians, and alchemists continued to discuss the nature of the astral world between Earth and the divine. Once the telescope established no spiritual heaven was visible around the Solar System, the idea was superseded in mainstream science.

== Astral experience ==
According to various occult teachings, the astral plane can be visited consciously through astral projection, meditation and mantra, near-death experience, lucid dreaming, hypnosis, or other means. Individuals that are trained in the use of the astral vehicle can separate their consciousness in the astral vehicle from the physical body at will. The first stage in development, according to William Walker Atkinson (also known as Yogi Ramacharaka), is "mastery of the physical body and its care and attention", which pertains not only to the physical body but also to its double in the astral. In addition, one must spend time tuning the "instinctive mind". The first three subdivisions of the instinctive mind are passions, desires, and lusts. The second stage is the intellect, otherwise known as the sharpening of the mind. Someone operating largely out of the instinctive mind would "have only a glimmering of intellect", similarly those who are centered in the intellect would only have an inkling of the third, 'spiritual' stage of development. Once both earlier stages are completed the spiritual mind can be awakened.

In early theosophical literature the term "astral" may refer to the aether. Later theosophical authors such as Annie Besant and C. W. Leadbeater make the astral finer than the etheric plane but "denser" than the mental plane. In order to create a unified view of seven bodies and remove earlier Sanskrit terms, an etheric plane was introduced and the term "astral body" was used to replace the former kamarupa - sometimes termed the body of emotion, illusion or desire. Some of those propounding such claims explain their belief that letting go of desires is spiritual progress by noting that, the more one lets go of earthly 'desire' feelings, the less tied down to the physical world, a world of illusion, and the more connected to the astral, where all is visible and known.

According to Max Heindel's Rosicrucian writings, desire-stuff may be described as a type of force-matter, in incessant motion, responsive to the slightest feeling. The desire world is also said to be the abode of the dead for some time subsequent to death. It is also the home of the archangels. In the higher regions of the desire world thoughts take a definite form and color perceptible to all, all is light and there is but one long day.

In his book Autobiography of a Yogi, Paramahansa Yogananda provides details about the astral planes learned from his guru. Yogananda claims that nearly all individuals enter the astral planes after death. There they work out the seeds of past karma through astral incarnations, or (if their karma requires) they return to earthly incarnations for further refinement. Once an individual has attained the meditative state of nirvikalpa samadhi in an earthy or astral incarnation, the soul may progress upward to the "illumined astral planet" of Hiranyaloka. After this transitional stage, the soul may then move upward to the more subtle causal spheres where many more incarnations allow them to further refine before final unification.

== See also ==
- Astral religion
- Bardo
- Chakra
- Dream world (plot device)
- Etheric plane
- Inner space
- Limbo
- Pure land
- Religious cosmology
- Spirit world
- Subtle body
- Takamagahara
