= Rays from the Rose Cross =

Christian esoteric magazine

Rays from the Rose Cross is a Christian esoteric magazine established in June 1913 by Max Heindel, author of The Rosicrucian Cosmo-Conception and founder of The Rosicrucian Fellowship; its original name was Echoes from Mount Ecclesia. It was issued bimonthly by The Rosicrucian Fellowship in the United States. Its publication stopped in April/May 2004.

It contained articles on themes such as Esoteric Christianity, Astrology, Philosophy, History, Science, Health, Nutrition, and Social issues, etc.
