= New Galilee =

New Galilee may refer to:

- New Galilee (the Sixth Epoch), the name given in the Western Wisdom Teachings to "a new heaven and a new earth" mentioned in the Bible
- New Galilee, Pennsylvania, a place in the United States
