= New Galilee (the Sixth Epoch) =

Biblical new heaven and new earth

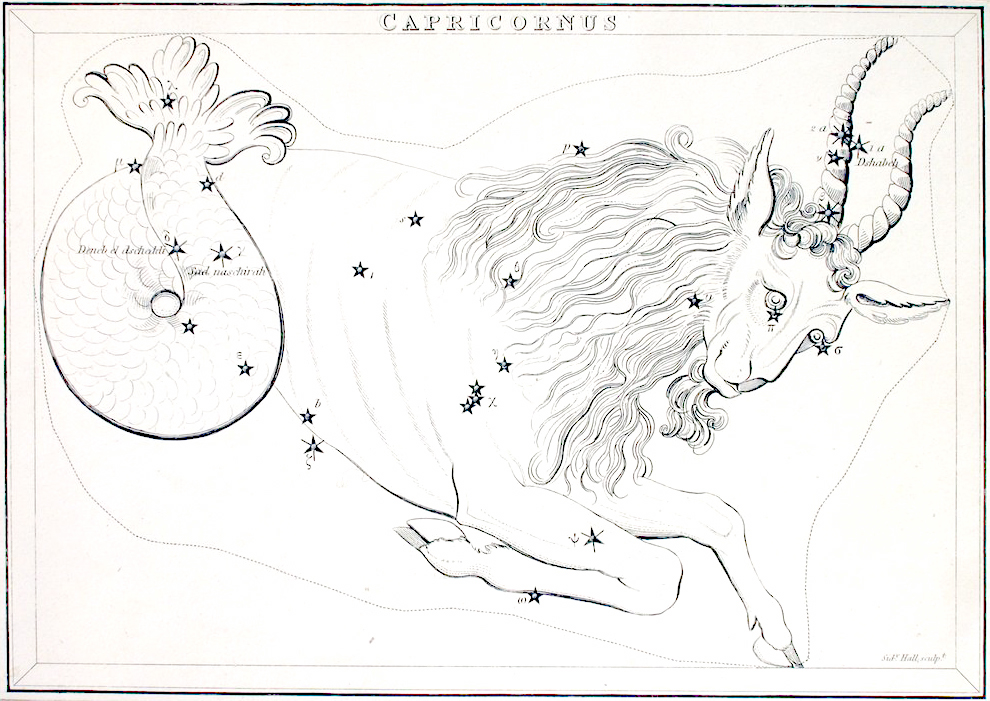

The New Galilee is the name given in the Western Wisdom Teachings to "a new heaven and a new earth" mentioned in the Bible. From the viewpoint of these Christian esoteric teachings, the New Galilee represents the future Sixth Epoch in mankind's evolutionary path and will see the transition of humanity to the etheric region of the Earth, where “sorrow and pain will cease and he[man] will have entered the path to the city of peace--Jer-u-salem, the future New Jerusalem to be established within, the heavenly ‘bride’ of the Christ's Race in the making.”

== Usage in the Western Wisdom Teachings ==
According to the Rosicrucian writings of Max Heindel the sixth sub-race of the current Aryan Epoch (the fifth epoch) has evolved among the Slavic peoples and the seventh sub-race is now evolving from this sixth sub-race. Heindel refers that the United States is the melting pot to form the last race in human evolution that will exist at the beginning of the Sixth Epoch, the New Galilee:

And the transformation of an earth worm to a butterfly soaring the skies is an apt illustration of the coming change from our present state and condition to those of the New Galilee where the Kingdom of Christ will be established; and what the change in the human constitution and environment is to be, may be seen by examining the past conditions as outlined in the Bible, which agrees with the occult traditions in the main points. This New Heaven and New Earth is now in the making. When the heavenly time marker, the Sun, came into Aries by precession, a new cycle commenced and the glad tidings were preached by Christ. He said by implication that the New Heaven and Earth were not ready then, when He told his disciples "whither I go, you cannot NOW follow, but you shall follow afterwards; I go to prepare a place for you and will come again and receive you." Later, John saw in a vision the New Jerusalem descending from Heaven, and Paul taught the Thessalonians BY THE WORD OF THE LORD that those who are Christ's at His coming shall be caught up IN THE AIR to meet Him and be with Him for the Age. This is in line with the tendencies shown by past developments. The Lemurians lived very close to the fiery core of the earth. The Atlanteans inhabited the basins somewhat further away from the center. The Aryans were driven by the flood to the hilltops where they are now living. And analogously, the citizens of the coming Age will inhabit the air. But we know that our dense body gravitates towards the center of the earth, therefore, a change must take place; also Paul tells us that flesh and blood cannot inherit the Kingdom of Heaven. But he also points out that we have a SOMA PSUCHICON (mistranslated natural body,) a SOUL BODY, and this is made of ether, which is lighter than air and therefore capable of levitation. This is the Golden Wedding Garment, the Philosopher's Stone, or the Living Stone, spoken of in some of the ancient philosophies as the Diamond Soul, for it is luminous, lustrous, and sparkling--a priceless gem. It was also called the ASTRAL BODY by the Mediaeval Alchemists, because of the ability it conferred upon the one who has it to traverse the starry regions. But it is not to be confounded with the Desire Body which some of the modern pseudo-occultists mistakenly call the Astral Body. This vehicle, the Soul Body, will eventually be evolved by humanity as a whole, but during the change from the Aryan epoch to the ethereal conditions of the New Galilee, there will be pioneers (...)

== See also ==
- Second Coming (Esoteric Christian teachings)
- Last Judgment (Esoteric Christian tradition)
- The New Earth
