= The Rosicrucian Cosmo-Conception =

1909 Rosicrucian text by Max Heindel

- Author: Max Heindel
- Media type: Print
- ISBN: 0-911274-34-0

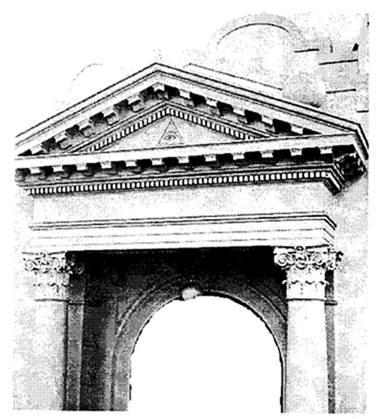
The Ecclesia's facade at The Rosicrucian Fellowship: the school founded by Max Heindel around the time The Rosicrucian Cosmo-Conception was written.

The Rosicrucian Cosmo-Conception or Mystic Christianity (also known as Western Wisdom Teachings) is a Rosicrucian text by Max Heindel, first published in 1909.

== Contents overview ==
The author talks about the true man and his journey through involution, spiritual evolution and epigenesis, presenting practical methods to help the development of latent potentials in each one of us and how to transmute our latency into dynamic powers in order to achieve, according to the author, direct knowledge and conscientious work in the inner planes.

It deals with many esoteric topics and also metaphysics, physiology and cosmology (the visible and invisible worlds, human evolution, death and rebirth, nutrition, esoteric training, ...). It contains a history of the evolution of the human spirit and related bodies (from before awareness, through various incarnations of our planet on various planes, and into the future development) and of animal, vegetable and mineral life waves (the myriad life forms and types of consciousness on this physical plane, experiencing their own points in evolution). It also presents an esoteric interpretation about the mission of Christ and an occult analysis of Biblical texts which include the fall of man, the Law of Cause and Consequence and Bible and rebirth, and many other themes which were further developed in the subsequent books, lectures and lessons given by the author at the time (1910s) in the United States.

=== Main themes ===
The Rosicrucian Cosmo-Conception is divided in three parts:
Part I: the Visible and the Invisible Worlds, Man and the Method of Evolution, Rebirth and the Law of Cause and Effect;
Part II: the scheme of Evolution in general and the Evolution of the Solar System and the Earth in particular;
Part III: Christ and His Mission, Future Development of Man and Initiation, Esoteric Training and a Safe Method of Acquiring Firsthand Knowledge.

== The Rosicrucian conception of God and the scheme of evolution ==
According to the Western Wisdom Teachings, in the beginning of a Day of Manifestation a certain collective Great Being, God, limits Himself to a certain portion of space, in which He elects to create a Solar System for the evolution of added self-consciousness.

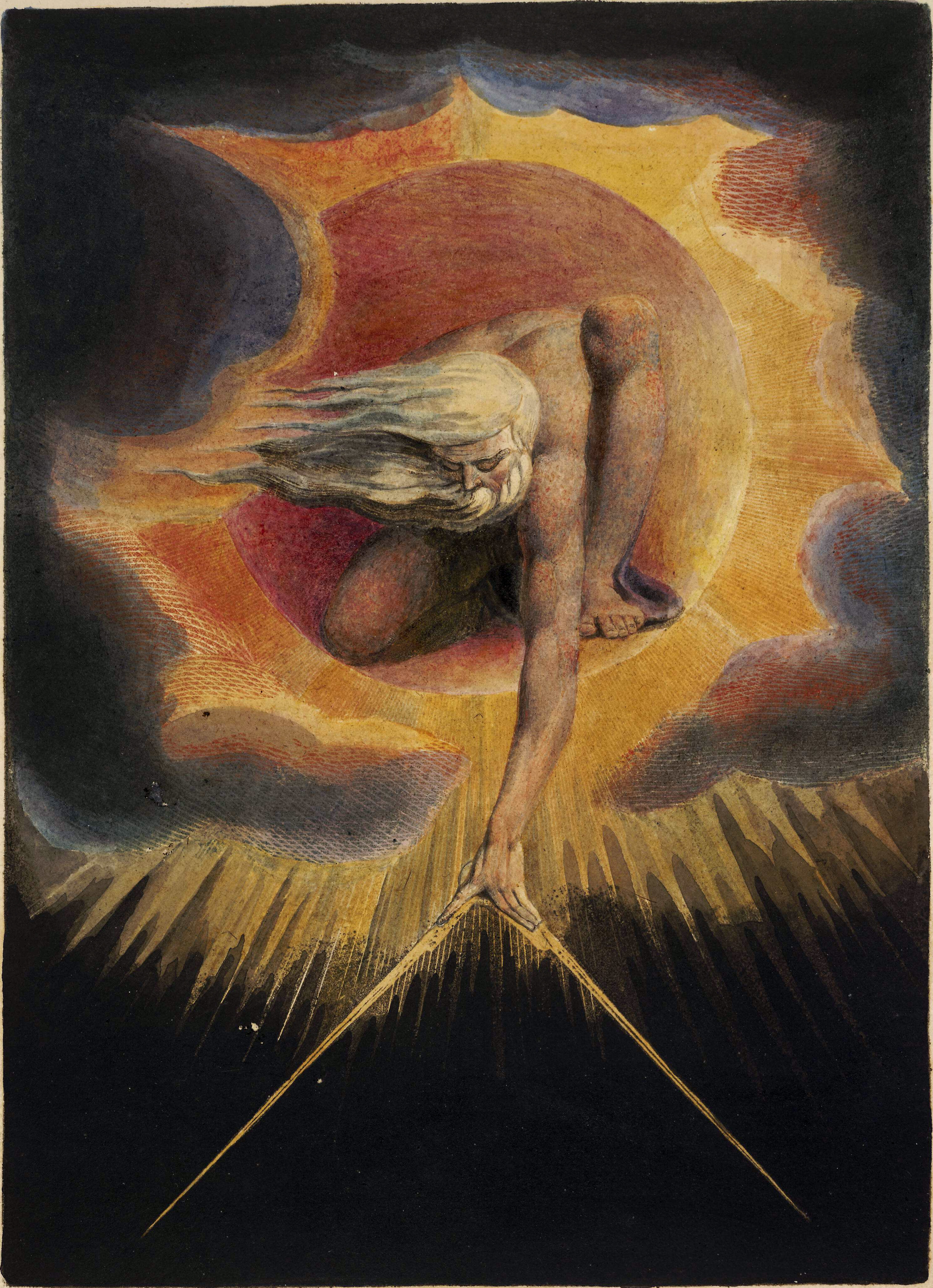
The Ancient of Days, illustrated by William Blake (1794)

In God there are contained hosts of glorious Hierarchies and lesser beings of every grade of intelligence and stage of consciousness, from omniscience to an unconsciousness deeper than that of the deepest trance condition. During the current period of manifestation these various grades of beings are working to acquire more experience than they possessed at the beginning of this period of existence. Those who, in previous manifestations, have attained the highest degree of development work on those who have not yet evolved any consciousness.

The period of time devoted to the attainment of self-consciousness and to the building of the vehicles through which the spirit in man manifests, is called "Involution". The succeeding period of existence, during which the individual human being develops self-consciousness into divine omniscience, is called "Evolution". Every evolving being has within him a "force" which makes evolution not to be a mere enfoldment of latent germinal possibilities but a process where each individual differs from that of every other. This force, called "Epigenesis", provides the element of originality and gives scope to the creative ability which the evolving being is to cultivate that he may become a God.

The Rosicrucian Cosmo-Conception describes that in the Solar System, God's Habitation, there are seven Worlds differentiated by God, within Himself, one after another. These Worlds have each a different "measure" and rate of vibration and are not separated by space or distance, as is the Earth from the other planets. They are states of matter, of varying density and vibration (as are the solids, liquids and gases of the physical Earth). These Worlds are not instantaneously created at the beginning of a day of Manifestation, nor do they last until the end. The evolutionary scheme is carried through five of these Worlds in seven great Periods of manifestation, during which the evolving virgin spirit becomes first human and then a God. The highest Worlds are created first, and as involution is to slowly carry the life into denser and denser matter for the building of forms, the finer Worlds gradually condense and new Worlds are differentiated within God to furnish the necessary links between Himself and the Worlds which have consolidated. In due time the point of greatest density, the nadir of materiality, is reached. From that point the life begins to ascend into higher Worlds, as evolution proceeds. That leaves the denser Worlds depopulated, one by one. When the purpose has been served for which a particular World was created, God ends its existence, which has become superfluous, by ceasing within Himself the particular activity which brought into being and sustained that World.

The Rosicrucians teach that the above referred seven Worlds belong to the lowest of the seven "Cosmic Planes". The Worlds and Cosmic Planes are not one above another in space, but the seven Cosmic Planes inter-penetrate each other and all the seven Worlds. They are states of spirit-matter, permeating one another, so that God and the other great Beings pervade every part of their own realms and realms of greater density than their own, including our world: "in Him we live and move and have our being". Proceeding from the physical world to the inner worlds, God - the "Architect of the Solar System", the Source and goal of human existence – is found in the highest division of the seventh Cosmic Plane: this is His World. In order to trace the origin of the Architect of the Solar System, one must pass to the highest of the seven Cosmic Planes: the "Realm of the Supreme Being", Who emanated from "The Absolute". The Absolute is beyond comprehension and, as manifestation implies limitation, He may be best described as "Boundless Being": the "Root of Existence".

From The Absolute proceeds the Supreme Being, at the dawn of manifestation: this is The One, the "Great Architect of the Universe". The first aspect of the Supreme Being may be characterized as Power, from this proceeds the second aspect, the Word, and from both of these proceeds the third aspect, Motion. From the threefold Supreme Being proceed the "seven Great Logoi". They contain within Themselves all the great Hierarchies which differentiate more and more as they diffuse through the various Cosmic Planes. In the Highest World of the seventh Cosmic Plane dwells the God of the solar systems in the Universe. These great Beings are also threefold in manifestation, like the Supreme Being. Their three aspects are Will, Wisdom and Activity.

== Comments about the Cosmo ==
=== The author's perspective ===
By Max Heindel in A Word to the Wise:

- If the book is "weighed and found wanting," the writer will have no complaint. He only fears a hasty judgment based upon lack of knowledge of the system he advocates—a hearing wherein the judgment is "wanting" in consequence of having been denied an impartial "weighing." He would further submit, that the only opinion worthy of the one who expresses it must be based upon knowledge.
- Yet he is convinced that The Rosicrucian Cosmo-Conception is far from being the last word on the subject.
- The Rosicrucian Cosmo-Conception is not dogmatic, neither does it appeal to any other authority than the reason of the student.
- The Rosicrucian Brotherhood has the most far-reaching, the most logical conception of the World-Mystery (...)
- It is emphatically stated that this work embodies only the writer's understanding of the Rosicrucian teachings concerning the World-Mystery (...)
- What is said in this work is to be accepted or rejected by the reader according to his own discretion.

---

- Now, perhaps you will understand my attitude towards the Rosicrucian Cosmo-Conception. I admire and marvel at its wonderful teaching more than anyone else, and can do so without violating proper modesty for the book is not mine—it belongs to humanity.

=== A critical essay ===
By Charles Weber in The Mystic and Occult in Max Heindel's Writings:

- The Cosmo’s author has "an unswerving desire, a burning thirst for knowledge", which is "the first and central requisite the aspirant to occult knowledge must possess", but with this qualification, that "the supreme motive for seeking this occult knowledge must be an ardent desire to benefit humanity" (22). "Another prerequisite to this first-hand knowledge, however, is the study of occultism second-hand" (23). It is the purpose of the Cosmo to make that second-hand study of occultism possible. Occult science is the science of what occurs occultly insofar as it is not perceived in external nature, but in that region toward which the soul turns when it directs its inner being toward the spirit.
- Heindel emphasizes the facticity of the Cosmo’s contents and the rigor and objectivity of his sources by using the term occult scientist(s) thirty times and occult science twenty-five times. The occultist (used twenty times) "knows" and "sees" what he is reporting on. "The occult scientist uses concentration in preference to prayer because the former is accomplished by the aid of the mind, which is cold and unfeeling, whereas prayer is usually dictated by emotion" (463). That is, concentration is more impersonal, and therefore more reliable. However, when emotion is replaced by a mystic’s "pure unselfish devotion to high ideals, prayer is much higher than cold concentration" (ibid).

=== Modern perspective ===
The first edition was printed in 1909 and has changed little since then.

== Publication history ==
The first edition was printed in November 1909. The order of publication was placed by Max Heindel on the New Moon of November 1909 and the book was published a couple of weeks later by the Full Moon, some 5 short weeks before the end of the first decade of the 1900s. It has little changed since then and it is considered to be Max Heindel's magnum opus. It is a reference work in the Christian mysticism practice and in the Occult study literature, containing the fundamentals of Esoteric Christianity from a Rosicrucian perspective. The Cosmo contains a comprehensive outline of the evolutionary process of man and the universe, correlating science with religion. It is, to this day, the basic book for the philosophy courses of the school, the Rosicrucian Fellowship, founded by the author on August 8, 1909.

=== The first dedicatory ===
The first edition of this work, containing more than 700 pages of in depth teachings into the major themes of the occult science, was dedicated to a knowledgeable lecturer in the occult field called Rudolf Steiner, to whom Max Heindel felt greatly indebted. It had the subtitle "Occult Science" instead of "Mystic Christianity" and just above the message and mission ("A Sane Mind, a Soft Heart and a Sound Body", "Service") there was a quotation from Paul of Tarsus: "PROVE ALL THINGS". In the subsequent edition, Heindel removed the initial dedication and changed the mentioned elements. The first dedication became a controversial issue among some students of both teachers down to the present. However, as both Heindel and Steiner appear to have been influenced by the same Elder Brother of the Rose Cross, to some extent and at some stage of their lives, it becomes an accessory issue that may only be unveiled through the discernment of the student along her/his path of spiritual unfoldment.

== See also ==
- Epochs (Anthropogenesis)
- Esoteric cosmology
- Planes of existence
- Rebirth
- Subtle bodies
