= Etheric body =

Concept in neo-Theosophy

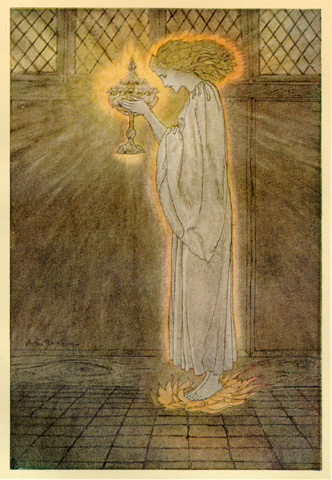
The Holy Grail, illustration by Arthur Rackham, 1917. Pre-Raphaelite art at this time often represented contemporary interest in the "spirit body", "aura" or "body of light".

The etheric body, ether-body, or æther body is a subtle body propounded in esoteric and occult philosophies as the first or lowest layer in the human energy field or aura. The etheric body is said to be in immediate contact with the physical body and to sustain it and connect it with "higher" bodies. It is also said to consist of a finer substance, more pure and composed of smaller particles, than the ordinary matter of the physical plane. (See the book Occult Chemistry by C.W. Leadbeater)

The English term "etheric" in this context seems to derive from the Theosophical writings of Madame Blavatsky, but its use was formalised by C.W. Leadbeater and Annie Besant due to the elimination of Hindu terminology from the system of seven planes and bodies. (Adyar School of Theosophy).

The term gained some general popularity after World War I, Walter John Kilner having adopted it for a layer of the "human atmosphere" which, as he claimed in a popular book, could be rendered visible to the naked eye by means of certain exercises.

The classical element Aether of Platonic and Aristotelian physics continued in Victorian scientific proposals of a Luminiferous ether as well as the cognate chemical substance ether. According to Theosophists and Alice Bailey the etheric body inhabits an etheric plane which corresponds to the four higher subplanes of the physical plane. The intended reference is therefore to some extremely rarefied matter, analogous in usage to the word "spirit" (originally "breath"). In selecting it as the term for a clearly defined concept in an Indian-derived metaphysical system, the Theosophists aligned it with ideas such as the prana-maya-kosha (sheath made of prana, subtle breath or life-force) of Vedantic thought.

In popular use it is often confounded with the related concept of the astral body as for example in the term astral projection - the early Theosophists had called it the "astral double". Others prefer to speak of the "lower and higher astral".

== Accounts ==
Teachings of an etheric body can be found in some branches of Buddhism and Hinduism. Linga sarira is a Sanskrit term for the invisible double of the human body.

In Mahayana Buddhism, the soul leaves the body at death in a "shining" body which is able to pass through matter. This type of etheric body retains all the senses of the physical body, but lacks any imperfections that the physical body may have had. The etheric body or etheric double is a teaching in occultism and Theosophy. It is one of the seven principles of the human being, according to Theosophical philosophy.

In 1774, August Wilhelm Hupel wrote about the soul being composed from an etheric type of matter.

Rudolf Steiner, the founder of Anthroposophy, often referred to the etheric body (Ätherleib or "Life Body") in association with the etheric formative forces and the evolution of man and the cosmos. According to him, it can be perceived by a person gifted with clairvoyance as being of "peach-blossom color".

Steiner considered the etheric reality or life principle as quite distinct from the physical material reality, being intermediate between the physical world and the astral or soul world. The etheric body can be characterised as the life force also present in the plant kingdom. It maintains the physical body's form until death. At that time, it separates from the physical body and the physical reverts to natural disintegration.

According to Max Heindel's Rosicrucian writings, the etheric body, composed of four ethers, is called the "Vital Body" since the ether is the way of ingress for vital force from the Sun and the field of agencies in nature which promote such vital activities as assimilation, growth, and propagation. It is an exact counterpart of our physical body, molecule for molecule, and organ for organ, but it is of the opposite polarity. It is slightly larger, extending about one and one-half inches beyond the periphery of the physical body.

Samael Aun Weor teaches that the vital body is the tetra-dimensional part of the physical body and the foundation of organic life. He states that in the second Initiation of Fire, which is reached through working with sexual magic with a spouse, the Kundalini rises in the vital body. Then the initiate learns how to separate the two superior ethers from the others in order for them to serve as a vehicle to travel out of the physical body.

On the Tree of Life of the Kabbalah, the vital body is often related to the sephirah Yesod.

Arthur Findlay wrote about the etheric body in his book On The Edge Of The Etheric, published in 1931.

== Beings that possess only etheric bodies ==
In the teachings of Theosophy, Devas are regarded as living either in the atmospheres of the planets of the Solar System (Planetary Angels) or inside the Sun (Solar Angels) (presumably other planetary systems and stars have their own angels) and they help to guide the operation of the processes of nature such as the process of evolution and the growth of plants; their appearance is reputedly like colored flames about the size of a human being. Some (but not most) devas originally incarnated as human beings.

Nature spirits, elementals (gnomes, ondines, sylphs, and salamanders), and fairies are said to be on the “deva evolution” line of spiritual development; as their souls advance, they eventually incarnate as devas but never incarnate in human form. Theosophists assert that all these beings possess only an etheric body, and no physical body, and that they can be observed when the third eye is activated.

== Criticism ==
Susan Blackmore has raised various objections to the idea of an etheric body, noting that "it is not much of a theory to argue that the double is material, and can do all the things required of it, yet is invisible, undetectable, and consists of some kind of matter we know nothing whatever about. This is just evasion, not theory".

David Papineau has written that research from biochemistry, physics and physiology have failed to uncover any evidence for the existence of forces above the basic physical forces acting on living bodies thus there is no evidence that ethereal doubles exist.

== See also ==
- Astral body
- Esoteric cosmology
- Esoteric healing
- Etheric projection
- Illusory body
- Luminous mind
- Mental body
- Odic fluid, Prana, Qi
- Subtle body
