= Great Architect of the Universe =

Conception of God

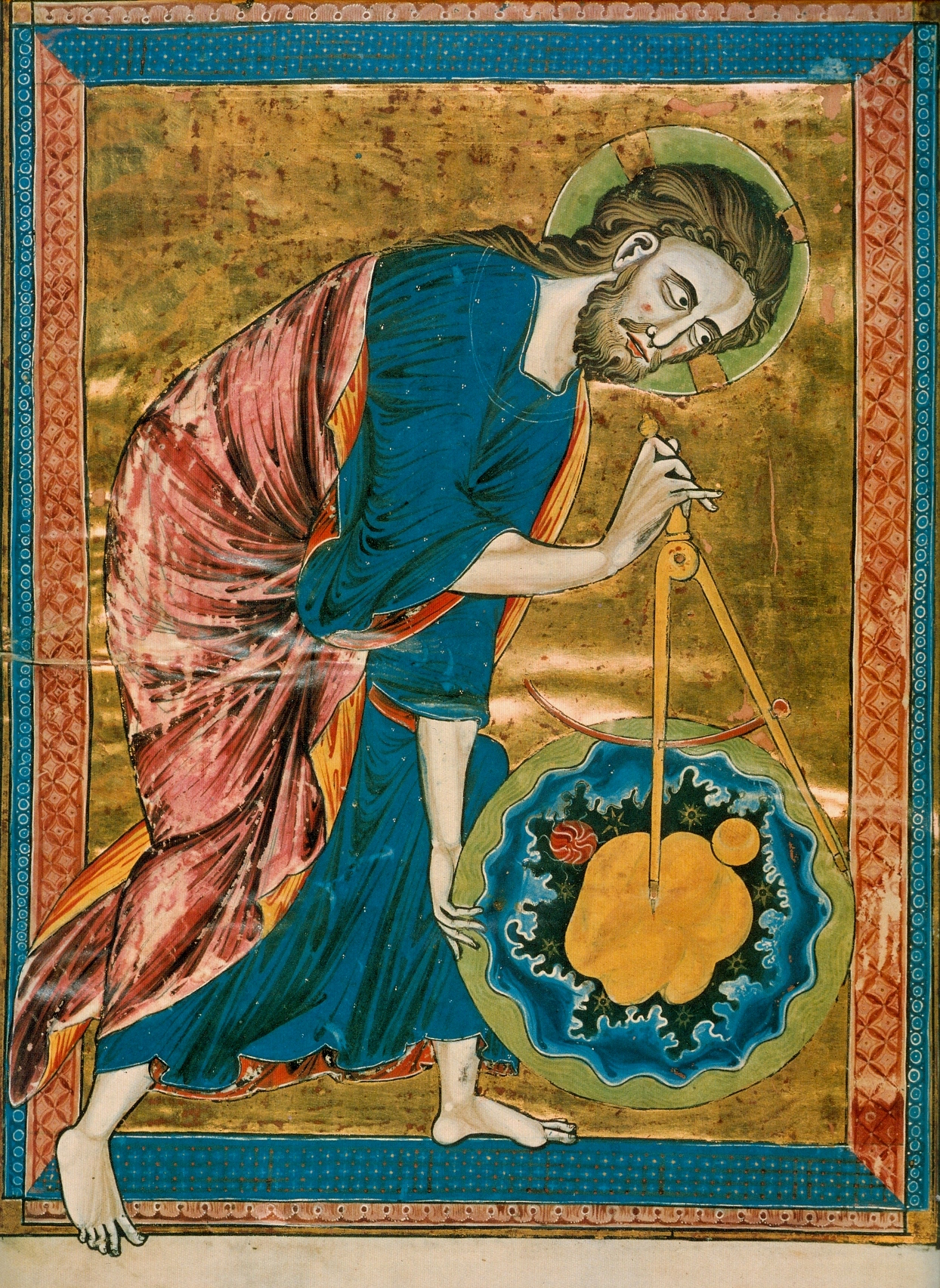
Science (particularly geometry and astronomy) was linked directly to the divine for most medieval scholars, and for many Christian scientists today. Since they believe that God created the universe after geometric and harmonic principles, to seek these principles is therefore to seek and worship God.

The Great Architect of the Universe (also Grand Architect of the Universe or Supreme Architect of the Universe) is a conception of God discussed by many Christian theologians and apologists. As a designation it is used within Freemasonry to represent the deity neutrally in whatever form, and by whatever name each member may individually believe in. It is also a Rosicrucian conception of God, as expressed by Max Heindel.

== Christianity ==
The concept of God as the Great Architect of the Universe has been used many times within Christianity. An illustration of God as the architect of the universe can be found in a Bible from the Middle Ages and the comparison of God to an architect has been used by Christian apologists and teachers.

Thomas Aquinas said in the Summa: "God, Who is the first principle of all things, may be compared to things created 'as the architect is to things designed' (ut artifex ad artificiata)." Commentators have pointed out that the assertion that the Grand Architect of the Universe is the Christian God "is not evident on the basis of natural theology alone but requires an additional 'leap of faith' based on the revelation of the Bible". However, Aquinas' God was not neutral, as he is interpreted as the highest good, and it has a specific form, in that he is anthropomorphic in the person of Jesus Christ.

John Calvin, in his Institutes of the Christian Religion (1536), repeatedly calls the Christian God "the Architect of the Universe", also referring to his works as "Architecture of the Universe", and in his commentary on Psalm 19 refers to the Christian God as the "Great Architect" or "Architect of the Universe".

The concept of a Great Architect of the Universe also occurs in Martinism, a form of esoteric Christianity. Martinists hold that while it is possible to "invoke" him, it is not to adore him. Whole worship is traditionally reserved only to God, invocation can be also proper for an angel or demon.

== Freemasonry ==
Masonic historians such as William Bissey Gary Leazer (quoting Coil's Masonic Encyclopaedia), and S. Brent Morris, assert that "the Masonic abbreviation G.A.O.T.U., meaning the Great Architect of the Universe, continues a long tradition of using an allegorical name for the Deity." They trace how the name and the abbreviation entered Masonic tradition from the Book of Constitutions written in 1723 by the Reverend James Anderson. They also note that Anderson, a Calvinist minister, probably took the term from Calvin's usage.

Christopher Haffner's own explanation of the Masonic concept of a Great Architect of the Universe, as a placeholder for the Supreme Being of one's choice, is given in Workman Unashamed:

Now imagine me standing in lodge with my head bowed in prayer between Brother Mohammed Bokhary and Brother Arjun Melwani. To neither of them is the Great Architect of the Universe perceived as the Holy Trinity. To Brother Bokhary He has been revealed as Allah; to Brother Melwani He is probably perceived as Vishnu. Since I believe that there is only one God, I am confronted with three possibilities:

- They are praying to the Devil whilst I am praying to God;
- They are praying to nothing, as their Gods do not exist;
- They are praying to the same God as I, yet their understanding of His nature is partly incomplete (as indeed is mine — 1 Cor 13:12)

It is without hesitation that I accept the third possibility.

— Christopher Haffner, Workman Unashamed: The Testimony of a Christian Freemason, Lewis Masonic, 1989, p.39

The Swedish Rite, which has the prerequisite of professing to Christian Faith, uses the form "The Threefold Great Architect of the Universe".

== Gnosticism ==
The concept of the Great Architect of the Universe occurs in gnosticism. The Demiurge is the Great Architect of the Universe, identified as Yahweh of the Old Testament, in opposition to Christ and Sophia, messengers of the secret knowledge (gnosis) of the True God. For example, gnostics such as the Mandaeans believe the Pira Rabba is the source, origin, and container of all things, which is filled by the Mânâ Rabbâ, the Great Spirit, from which emanates the First Life Hayyi Rabbi. Hayyi Rabbi prays for companionship and progeny, whereupon the Second Life Yushamin, the Ultra Mkayyema or World-constituting Aeon, the Architect of the Universe, comes into being. From this architect come a number of aeons, who erect the universe under the foremanship of the Manda d-Hayyi or gnōsis zoēs, the personified knowledge of life.

== Hermeticism ==
The Great Architect may also be a metaphor alluding to the godhead potentiality of every individual. "(God)... That invisible power which all know does exist, but understood by many different names, such as God, Spirit, Supreme Being, Intelligence, Mind, Energy, Nature and so forth."

== Hinduism ==
In the Hindu mythology, Lord Vishvakarma is regarded as the “God of Architecture”. He is the supreme god of craftsmanship and perfect engineering. Viśvakarma (meaning "all creating" in Sanskrit) is the deity of the creative power that holds the universe together according to the Rigveda and is considered to be the original creator, architect, divine engineer of the universe from before the advent of time, also the root concept of the later Upanishadic figures of Brahman and Purusha in the historical Vedic religion.

Hindu scriptures describe many of Vishwakarma's architectural accomplishments. Through the four yugas (aeons of Hindu mythology), he had built several towns and palaces for the gods. Among them were, in chronological order, Svarga (Heaven) in Satya Yuga, Lanka in Treta Yuga, and Dwarka (Krishna's capital) in Dvapara Yuga.

== Rosicrucianism ==
In Max Heindel's exposition, the Great Architect of the Universe is the Supreme Being, who proceeds from The Absolute, at the dawn of manifestation.

== Others ==
James Hopwood Jeans, in his book The Mysterious Universe, also employs the concept of a Great Architect of the Universe, saying at one point "Lapsing back again into the crudely anthropomorphic language we have already used, we may say that we have already considered with disfavour the possibility of the universe having been planned by a biologist or an engineer; from the intrinsic evidence of his creation, the Great Architect of the Universe now begins to appear as a pure mathematician." To that Jinarajadasa adds his observation that the Great Architect is "also a Grand Geometrician. For in some manner or other, whether obvious or hidden, there seems to be a geometric basis to every object in the universe."

== See also ==
- Christianity and science
- Creation myth
- Deism
- Demiurge
- Intelligent designer
- Monad (Gnosticism)
