= Plane (esotericism) =

Subtle state, level, or region of reality

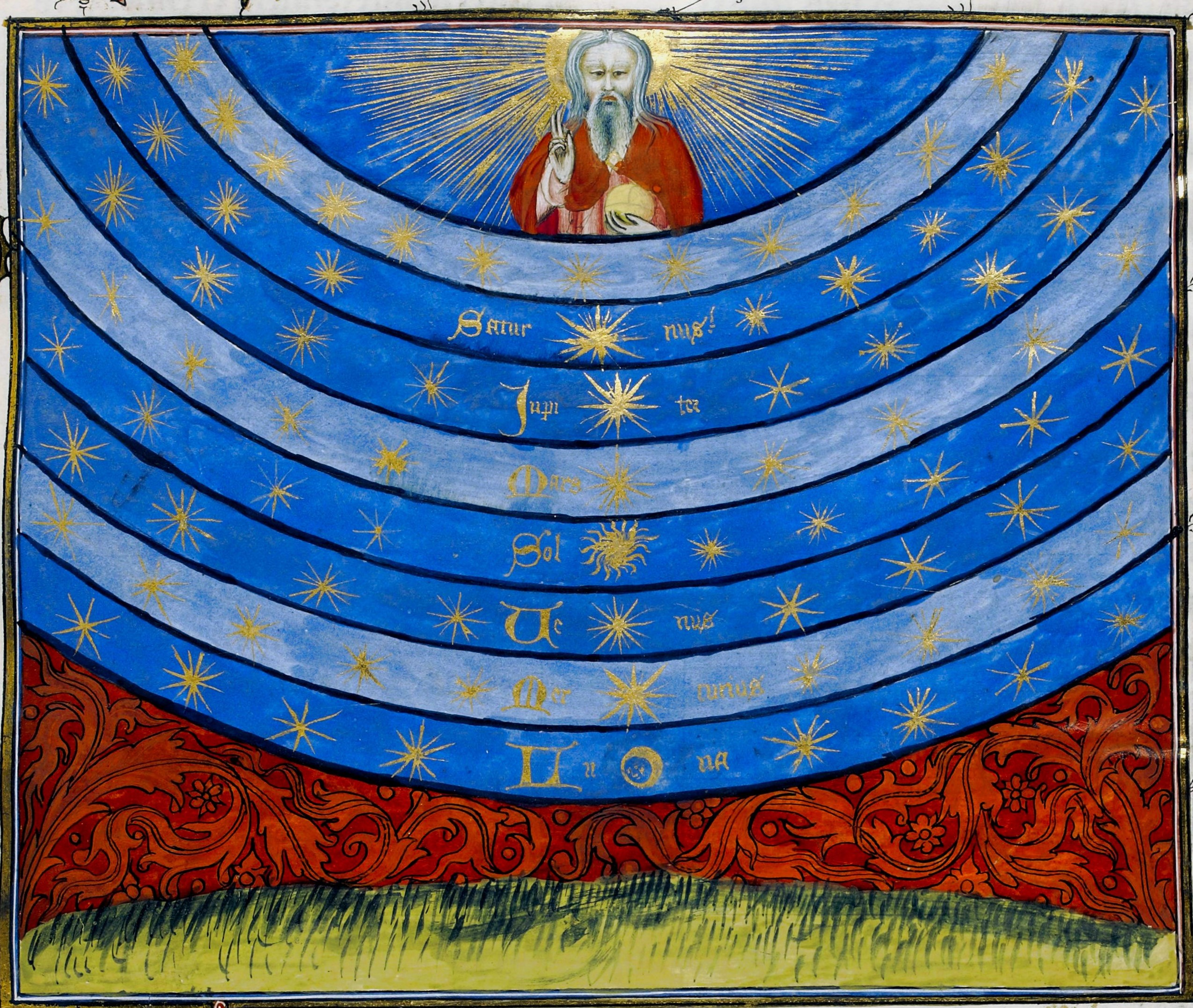
The astral spheres were thought to be planes of angelic existence intermediate between Earth and heaven.

In esoteric cosmology, a plane is conceived as a subtle state, level, or region of reality, each plane corresponding to some type, kind, or category of being.

The concept may be found in religious and esoteric teachings which propound the idea of a whole series of subtle planes or worlds or dimensions which, from a center, interpenetrate themselves and the physical planet in which we live, the solar systems, and all the physical structures of the universe. This interpenetration of planes culminates in the universe itself as a physical structured, dynamic and evolutive expression emanated through a series of steadily denser stages, becoming progressively more materialized, and embodied.

The emanation is conceived, according to esoteric teachings, to have originated, at the dawn of the universe's manifestation, in The Supreme Being who sent out—from the unmanifested Absolute beyond comprehension—the dynamic force of creative energy, as sound-vibration ("the Word"), into the abyss of space. Alternatively, it states that this dynamic force is being sent forth, through the ages, framing all things that constitute and inhabit the universe.

== Origins of the concept ==
The original source of the word plane in this context is the late Neoplatonist Proclus, who in the 5th century referred to to platos, or "breadth", which was the equivalent of the 19th-century theosophical use. An example is the phrase en to psychiko platei.

== Esoteric conceptions ==
In the late 19th century, the metaphysical term "planes" was popularised by the theosophy of H. P. Blavatsky, who in The Secret Doctrine and other writings propounded a complex cosmology consisting of seven planes and subplanes, based on a synthesis of Eastern and Western ideas. The planes in Theosophy were further systematized in the writings of Annie Besant and C. W. Leadbeater.

From theosophy the term made its way to later esoteric systems such as that of Alice Bailey. Max Theon used the word "States" (French Etat) rather than "Planes", in his cosmic philosophy, but the meaning is the same.

In the early 20th century, Max Heindel presented in The Rosicrucian Cosmo-Conception a cosmology related to the scheme of evolution in general and the evolution of the Solar System and the Earth in particular, according to the Rosicrucians. He establishes, through the conceptions presented, a bridge between modern science (currently starting research into the subtler etheric plane of existence behind the physical) and religion, in order that this last one may be able to address man's inner questions raised by scientific advancement.

== The planes ==
Many occult, psychic, metaphysical, mystical, and esoteric teachings assert that at least four separate planes of existence exist; however, these differing occult and metaphysical schools often label the planes of existence with their own unique terms. These planes of existence often tend to overlap with each other heavily in both description and conception (especially between schools), and can roughly be delineated into "physical", "mental", "spiritual", or "transcendent" categories.

== See also ==
- Chain of being
- Many-worlds interpretation
- Silver cord
- Spiritual evolution
