= Rose Cross =

Western esoteric symbol

A Rose Cross with a fleur-de-lis design on its spokes

The Rose Cross (also called Rose Croix and Rosy Cross) is a symbol largely associated with the legendary Christian Rosenkreuz, a Christian Kabbalist and alchemist said to have been the founder of the Rosicrucian Order. The Rose Cross is a cross with a rose at its centre, which is usually red, golden, or white. (Note: "Commentaries and studies have been multiplied upon the Divine Comedy, the work of DANTE, and yet no one, so far as we know, has pointed out its especial character. ... His hell is but a negative purgatory. His heaven is composed of a series of Kabalistic circles, divided by a cross, like the Pantacle of Ezekiel. In the centre of this cross blooms a rose, and we see the symbol of the Adepts of the Rose-Croix for the first time publicly expounded and almost categorically explained.") It symbolizes the teachings of a Western esoteric tradition with Christian tenets.

As a key Rosicrucian symbol, the Rosy Cross was also used by the Order of the Golden and Rosy Cross (1750s–1790s), and is still used by the Societas Rosicruciana in Anglia (1865–present).

== Symbolism ==
The Luther rose, a symbol of Lutheranism

The Rosicrucian manifestos were written during the Protestant Reformation in Germany, and have an underlying theme of reform. In 1520, Martin Luther had a seal made with a five-petaled white rose encapsulating a heart, with a simple cross in the centre. Johannes Valentinus Andreae, a likely candidate for the authorship of the third Rosicrucian manifesto, the Chymical Wedding of Christian Rosenkreutz, came from a family whose crest featured an X-shaped cross with roses in the four corners.

Many allegorical and esoteric explanations for the Rose Cross have arisen over the centuries. Some groups, such as the Ancient and Mystical Order Rosae Crucis, purport that the rosy cross predates Christianity, where "the cross represents the human body and the rose represents the individual's unfolding consciousness.

It has also been suggested that the rose represents silence while the cross signifies "salvation, to which the Society of the Rose-Cross devoted itself by teaching mankind the love of God and the beauty of brotherhood, with all that they implied." Others saw the Rosy Cross as a symbol of the human process of reproduction elevated to the spiritual:

"The fundamental symbols of the Rosicrucians were the rose and the cross; the rose female and the cross male, both universal phallic ... As generation is the key to material existence, it is natural that the Rosicrucians should adopt as its characteristic symbols those exemplifying the reproductive processes. As regeneration is the key to spiritual existence, they therefore founded their symbolism upon the rose and the cross, which typify the redemption of man through the union of his lower temporal nature with his higher eternal nature."

It is further a symbol of the philosopher's stone, the ultimate product of alchemy.

== Rosicrucianism ==
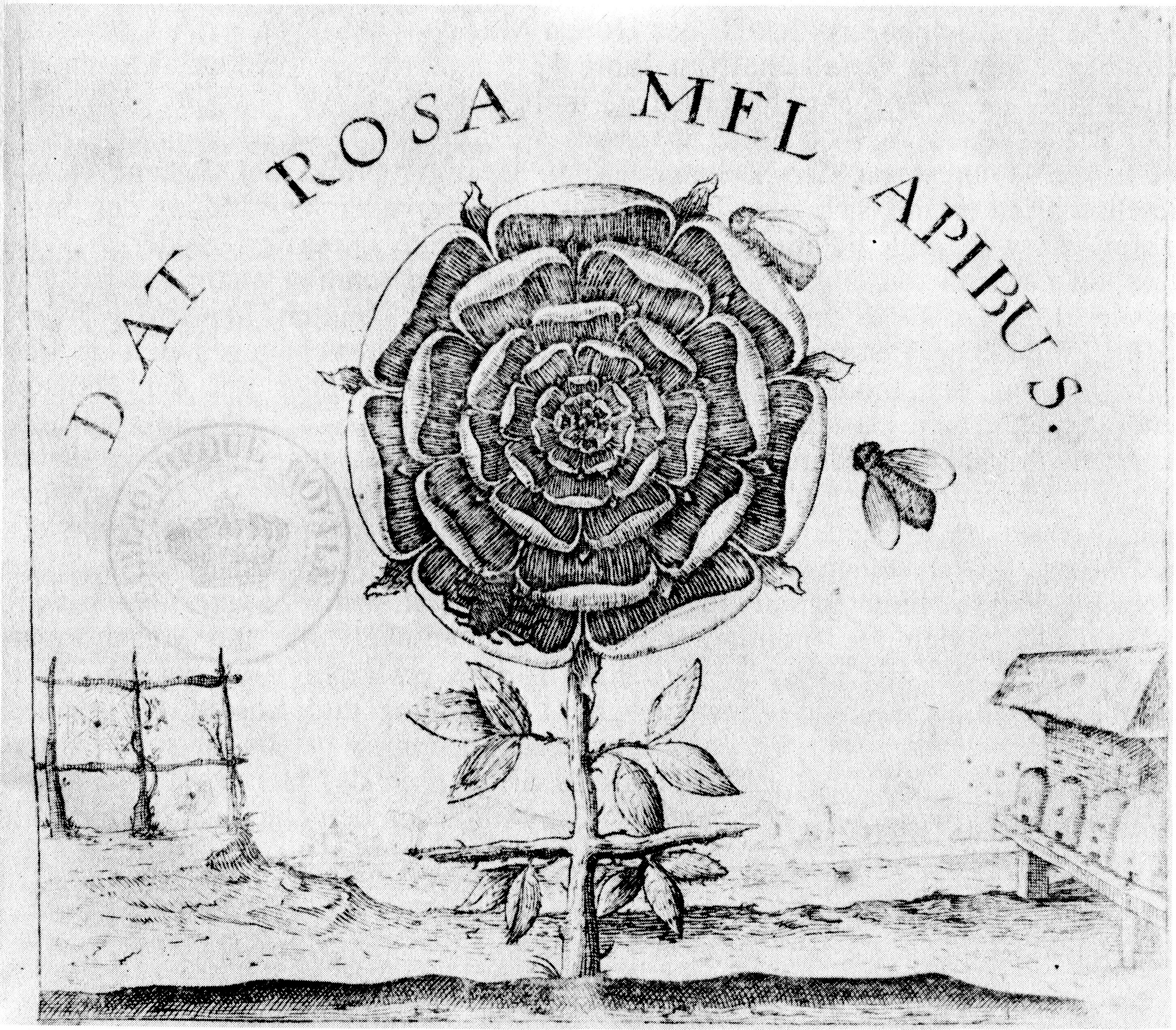
The rose gives the bees honey from title page of Fludd (1629) (Note: "This explicitly Rosicrucian symbol was first used at the head of Joachim Frizius's Summum Bonum, then adopted for (Robert) Fludd's Clavis. A rose with seven petals each alludes, in all probability, to secret doctrines of septenary emanation such as were later to be publicized in the theosophical works of Blavatsky. The rose surmounts the thorny cross, the whole resembling the sign of Venus in which the solar circle triumphs over the cross of matter. We may interpret the motto as saying that spiritual knowledge gives solace to souls, of whom bees are a venerable symbol.")

The Rosicrucian manifestos tell an allegorical story of the Rosicrucian Brotherhood, founded in the early 14th century, or between the 13th and 14th centuries, as an invisible college of mystic sages, by a sage having the symbolic name of Christian Rosenkreuz in order

"to prepare a new phase of the Christian religion to be used during the coming age now at hand, for as the world and man evolve so also must religion change."

Paracelsus, who was called the "Luther of Medicine", describes these mystics sages as

"persons who have been exalted [verzueckt] to God, and who have remained in that state of exaltation, and have not died ... nobody knew what became of them, and yet they remained on the earth."

Some modern Rosicrucian groups suggest that the Rosicrucian Order has been active since the beginning of the Renaissance period, not only as an hermetic Order, but also through forerunners – geniuses of the western world, sometimes known to also be Freemasons – in the literary, cultural, ethical, political, religious and scientific fields.

In the late 18th century, von Eckartshausen, a German Christian mystic, described the true Adepts of the Rose Cross in the following terms:

"These sages, whose number is small, are children of light, and are opposed to darkness. They dislike mystification and secrecy; they are open and frank, have nothing to do with secret societies and with external ceremonies. They possess a spiritual temple, in which God is presiding." (Note: von Eckartshausen, Karl (1790). Aufschlüsse über Magie [Explanations Concerning Magic] (in German). Munich, DE — as cited by Hartmann (1993))

Later, in the early 20th century, Max Heindel, a Rosicrucian Initiate, believed that the roots of the Brothers of the Rose Cross, immersed in the Western mystery tradition, are almost impossible to trace as

"theirs is a work which aims to encourage the evolution of humanity, they have labored far back into antiquity—under one guise or another."

== Initiatory groups ==
The Orden des Gold- und Rosenkreutz, also known as the Fraternity of the Golden and Rosy Cross, was founded in the 1750s and is believed to be the first Rosicrucian order which existed outside of allegory. Their ten-grade system went on to influence Masonic and Hermetic initiatory groups, such as the SRIA.

=== Freemasonry ===
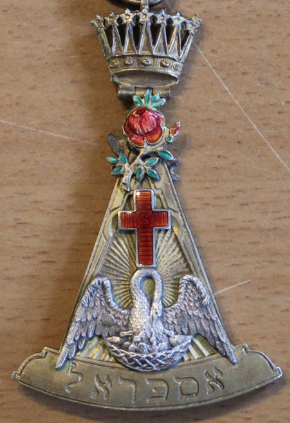
The jewel of the 18° in the Masonic Scottish Rite, a degree titled Knight or Sovereign Prince of the Rose Croix

Connections between Freemasonry and Rose Cross exist from times preceding the formation of the original Grand Lodge (landmarks of Andersen, in 1717). The Rosy Cross is also a symbol found in some Masonic Christian bodies (Note: See image The "18° Knight of the Rose Croix" representing a degree of Scottish Rite Masonic order.) and employed by individuals and groups formed during the last centuries for the study of Rosicrucianism and allied subjects, (Note: See image Rosy Cross lamen, a symbol used by the Hermetic Order of the Golden Dawn.) but derived from the adoption of a red rose.

The Masonic Societas Rosicruciana in Anglia was founded in England in 1865 and uses the same grade system as the Gold und Rosenkreutz. The English group has since inspired other Masonic and initiatory Societas Rosicruciana organizations internationally.

Within the Scottish Rite of Freemasonry, the Eighteenth Degree is specifically concerned with the rose cross and confers the title of "Knight Rose Croix". Of one version of the degree, Albert Pike wrote in 1871,

The Degree of Rose Cross teaches three things — the unity, immutability and goodness of God; the immortality of the Soul; and the ultimate defeat and extinction of evil and wrong and sorrow, by a Redeemer or Messiah, yet to come, if he has not already appeared.

Thomas De Quincey suggested that Freemasonry was possibly an outgrowth of Rosicrucianism.

=== Hermetic Order of the Golden Dawn ===
The Hermetic Order of the Golden Dawn was founded by three members of the SRIA, and made use of the rosy cross as well, including The Ritual of the Rose Cross, designed for spiritual protection and as preparation for meditation. Based on the Rosicrucian symbolism of the red rose and the cross of gold, it is also a key symbol of the Golden Dawn's second order.

According to Israel Regardie, the Golden Dawn's rosy cross contains attributes for the classical elements, classical planets, zodiac, Hebrew alphabet, alchemical principles, the hexagram and pentagram, the sefirot of the Tree of Life, and the formula of INRI. On the back side of the rosy cross is inscribed the motto of the Zelator Adeptus minor at the bottom, "The master Jesus Christ, God and Man" between four Maltese crosses, and in the center, written in Latin, "Blessed be the Lord our God who hath given us the Symbol Signum."

The Rosy Cross lamen as worn by adepts in the Rosae Rubae et Aureae Crucis, an inner order of the Golden Dawn.

Regardie says of the rosy cross in The Golden Dawn:

The Rose-Cross is a lamen or badge synthesizing a vast concourse of ideas, representing in a single emblem the great work itself – the harmonious reconciliation in one symbol of diverse and apparently contradictory concepts, the reconciliation of divinity and manhood. It is a highly important symbol to be worn over the heart during every important operation. It is a glyph, in one sense, of the higher Genius to whose knowledge and conversation the student is eternally aspiring. In the rituals it is described as the "Key of Sigils and Rituals".

This lamen is a complete synthesis of the masculine, positive, or rainbow scale of color attributions, which is also called the "Scale of the King". The four arms of the cross belong to the four elements and are colored accordingly. The white portion belongs to the Holy Spirit and the planets.

The petals of the rose refer to the twenty-two paths on the Tree of Life and the twenty-two letters of the Hebrew alphabet. It is the cross in Tiphareth, the receptacle and the center of the forces of the sephiroth and the paths. The extreme center of the rose is white, the reflected spiritual brightness of kether, bearing upon it the red rose of five petals and the golden cross of six squares: Four green rays issue from around the angles of the cross. Upon the white portion of the lamen, below the rose, is placed the hexagram, with the planets.

Around the pentagrams, which are placed one upon each elemental colored arm, are drawn the symbols of the spirit and the four elements. Upon each of the floriated (the arms) of the cross are arranged the three alchemical principles of sulfur, salt, and mercury. The white rays issuing from behind the rose at the inner angles between the arms of the cross are the rays of the divine light issuing and coruscating from the reflected light of kether in its center; and the letters and symbols on them refer to the analysis of the key word: I.N.R.I.

== Thelema ==
Kabbalistic Order of the Rose-Cross version of Rosy Cross – the Hebrew Tetragrammaton divine name on the arms of the cross, and the Pentagrammaton in the inner pentagram

The symbol of the rosy cross played a substantial role within the system of Thelema as developed by Aleister Crowley. In a cosmological context, the rose is Nuit, the infinitely expanded goddess of the night sky, and the cross is Hadit, the ultimately contracted atomic point. For Crowley, it was the job of the adept to identify with the appropriate symbol so to experience the mystical conjunction of opposites, which leads to attainment. In this sense, the rose cross is a grand symbol of the Great Work:

The Tau and the circle together make one form of the Rosy Cross, the uniting of subject and object which is the Great Work, and which is symbolized sometimes as this cross and circle, sometimes as the Lingam-Yoni, sometimes as the Ankh or Crux Ansata, sometimes by the Spire and Nave of a church or temple, and sometimes as a marriage feast, mystic marriage, spiritual marriage, "chymical nuptials," and in a hundred other ways. Whatever the form chosen, it is the symbol of the Great Work.

Crowley also believed that this process is reflected in the sexual act:

So we need not be surprised if the Unity of Subject and Object in Consciousness which is samādhi, the uniting of the Bride and the Lamb which is Heaven, the uniting of the Magus and the god which is Evocation, the uniting of the Man and his Holy Guardian Angel which is the seal upon the work of the Adeptus Minor, is symbolized by the geometrical unity of the circle and the square, the arithmetical unity of the 5 and the 6, and (for more universality of comprehension) the uniting of the Lingam and the Yoni, the Cross and the Rose. For as in earth-life the sexual ecstasy is the loss of self in the Beloved, the creation of a third consciousness transcending its parents, which is again reflected into matter as a child; so, immeasurably higher, upon the Plane of Spirit, Subject and Object join to disappear, leaving a transcendent unity. This third is ecstasy and death; as below, so above.

The rosy cross is further symbolic of the grade of Adeptus Minor in the A∴A∴, the Qabalistic sphere of Tiphareth on the Tree of Life, the magical formula INRI, and the concepts of Light (LVX) and Life.

=== Ordo Templi Orientis ===
The rose cross also has a place in the system of Ordo Templi Orientis. It is associated with the Fifth Degree, the title of which is "Sovereign Prince Rose-Croix, and Knight of the Pelican and Eagle." Of it, Crowley writes in "An Intimation with Reference to the Constitution of the Order":

The members of the Fifth Degree are responsible for all that concerns the Social welfare of the Order. This grade is symbolically that of beauty and harmony; it is the natural stopping-place of the majority of men and women; for to proceed farther, as will appear, involves renunciation of the sternest kind. Here then is all joy, peace, well-being on all planes; the Sovereign Prince Rose Croix is attached equally to the higher and the lower, and forms a natural link between them. Yet let him look to it that his eyes are set on high!

== Fellowship of the Rosy Cross ==
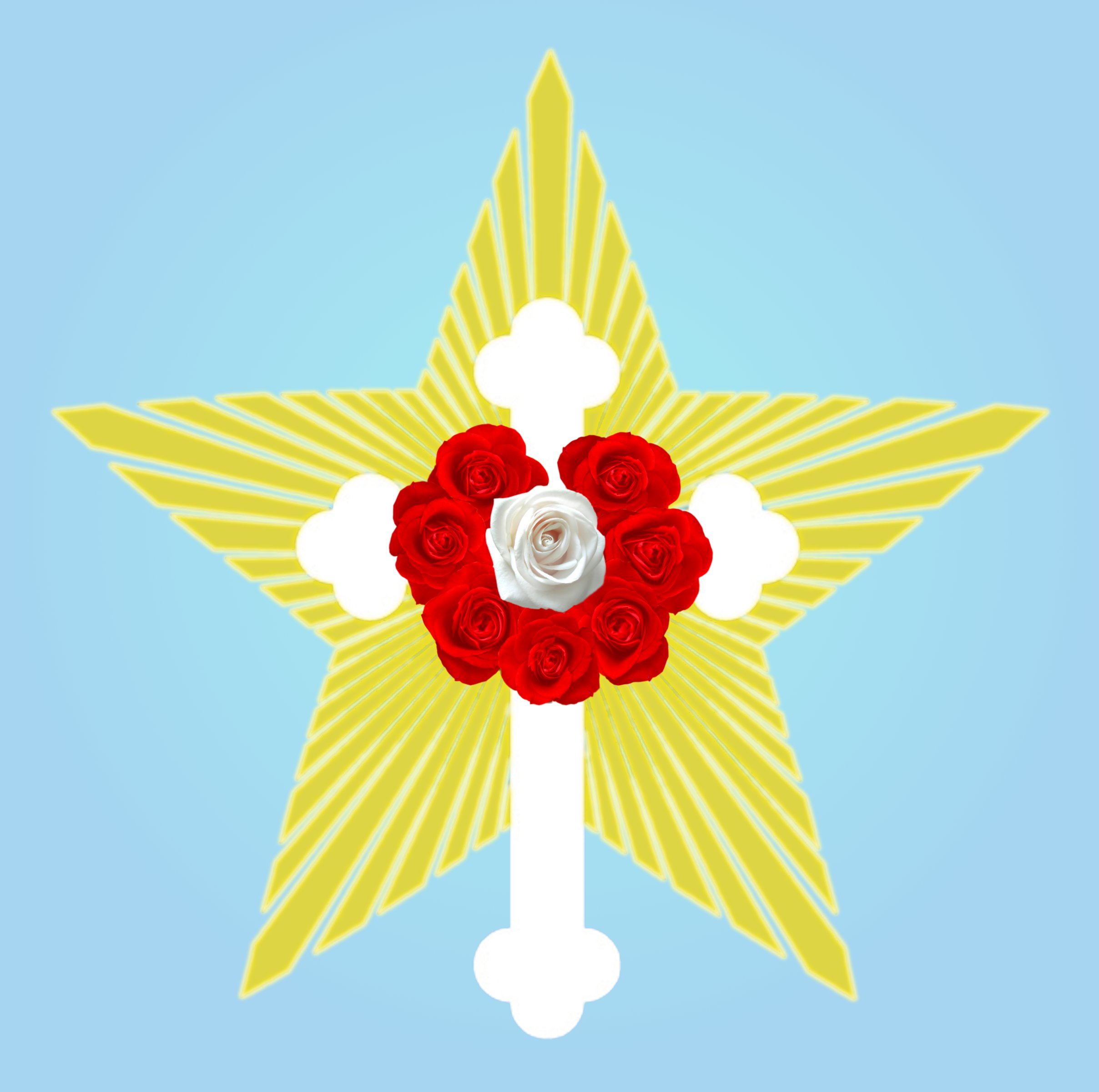
Rosicrucian Fellowship emblem

The Fellowship of the Rosy Cross is a Christian mystical organization in England established in 1915 by A.E. Waite. It developed after the end of Independent and Rectified Rite of the Golden Dawn. Waite made its rites to reflect his interest in the history of the Rosicrucian Order, Freemasonry, and Christian mystical teachings through the ages. Most of its members were also Freemasons or theosophists. One of its most noted members was the novelist Charles Williams who was a member from 1917 to at least 1928 and possibly later. There were plans to establish a branch in the United States, but they appear never to have been fulfilled. The order is still extant in England today. Waite (1924) represents the brotherhood as a Christian order that dates from the Middle Ages.

== Modern forms ==
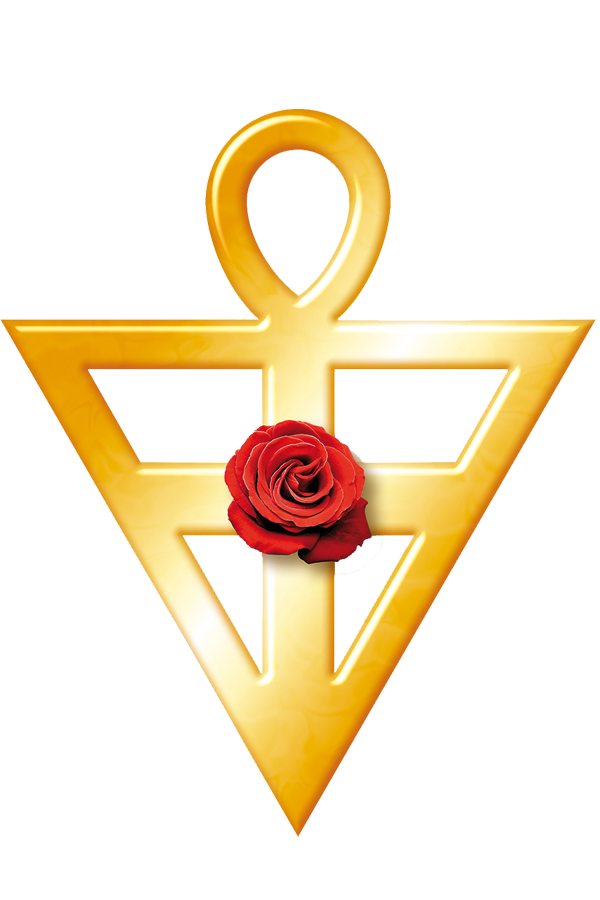
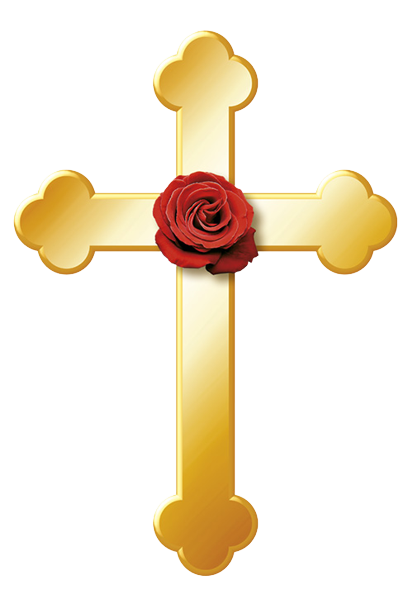
Variations on the Rose Cross used by Ancient Mystical Order Rosae Crucis (AMORC)

One modern form of the Rosie Cross is found in a Rosicrucian Christian symbol that places a crown of red roses ennobling a white rose at the centre of the cross; radiating behind is the golden five-pointed star, an allusion also to 'the Five Points of Fellowship'. (Note: See image emblem of the Rosicrucian Fellowship) It is the symbol of the fraternity that has prepared a great lodge (Mount Ecclesia) for the brethren to be gathered. (Note: See image symbolic entrance to Mount Ecclesia)

The Ancient and Mystical Order Rosae Crucis (AMORC) is the largest Rosicrucian group today, extending worldwide through twenty-three grand lodges or jurisdictions. The AMORC uses two main versions of the symbol: One is a gold Latin cross with a rose at its center. The other is a downward pointing triangle with a Greek (equilateral) cross inscribed within the triangle and a top oval reminiscent of an Egyptian Ankh. In both cases the symbolism suggests that

"together, the rose and cross represent the experiences and challenges of a thoughtful life well-lived."

In addition, the gold Latin cross version is interpreted as a person with arms outstretched in worship, and the rose at its center as the unfolding of the human soul over many lifetimes of work.

== See also ==
- Christian cross – Symbol of Christianity
- Crucifix – Christian cross featuring image of Jesus
- Luther rose – Widely recognized symbol for Lutheranism
- Rosa Mystica – Poetic title of the Virgin Mary
- Rose symbolism

== Sources ==
- Crowley, A. (Autumn 1910). "The Big Stick". The Equinox. Vol. I, no. 4. London, UK: Privately printed.
- Crowley, A. (Spring 1919). The Blue Equinox. The Equinox. Vol. III. Detroit, MI: Universal Publishing Co.
- Crowley, A. (1997). Beta, Hymenaeus (ed.). Liber ABA. Magick. Vol. Book Four, Parts I-IV. York Beach, ME: Samuel Weiser. ISBN 0-87728-919-0.
- Gilbert, Robert A. (1983). The Golden Dawn: Twilight of the magicians. Aquarian Press. ISBN 0-85030-278-1.
- Godwin, J. (1979). Robert Fludd: Hermetic philosopher of two worlds. Boulder, CO: Shambhala.
- Hall, M.P. (1928). The Secret Teachings of All Ages: An encyclopedic outline of Masonic, Hermetic, Quabbalistic and Rosicrucian symbolical philosophy. Philosophical Research Society.
- Heindel, M. (1911). "Christian Rosenkreuz and the Order of Rosicrucians". The Rosicrucian Cosmo-conception; or, Mystic Christianity. Rosicrucian Fellowship – via Google.
- Pike, A. (1871). Morals and Dogma of the Ancient and Accepted Scottish Rite of Freemasonry. L.H. Jenkins. ISBN 978-1-59232-815-4.
- Regardie, I. (1970). The Golden Dawn. Llewellyn Worldwide. ISBN 0-87542-663-8.
- Yates, F.A. (2013) [1972]. The Rosicrucian Enlightenment (reprint ed.). Taylor & Francis. ISBN 978-1-136-35389-5.
