= Life review =

Phenomenon reported as occurring during near-death experiences

Life review (Note: The phenomenon has been called life review, visual life review experience, and compressed life review in academic papers.) is a phenomenon widely reported in near-death experiences in which people see their life history in an instantaneous and rapid manifestation of autobiographical memory. Life review is often described by those who have experienced it as "having their life flash before their eyes". The experience often changes the way people view their life in a profound way.

== Research and phenomenology ==
Commentators note that near-death experiencers undergo a life review in which the meaning of their life is presented to them, but also how their life affected other people, as well as an awareness of the thoughts and feelings of these people. Bruce Greyson described the life review as a "rapid revival of memories that sometimes extends over the person's entire life". The memories are described as being "many". The review may also include a panoramic quality. According to Jeffrey Long, the experience of a life review is often described from a third-person perspective.

== History ==
In the year 1790, British naval officer Francis Beaufort nearly drowned and reported experiencing a life review. In 1847, a letter by Beaufort recalling the incident was published in the autobiography of Sir John Barrow, 1st Baronet. Wrote Beaufort:

"Thought rose after thought with a rapidity of succession that is not only indescribable, but probably inconceivable, by any one who has not been in a similar situation. The course of those thoughts I can even now in a great measure retrace... our last cruise – a former voyage, and shipwreck – my school – the progress I had made there, and the time I misspent – and even all my boyish pursuits and adventures. Thus travelling backwards, every past incident of my life seemed to glance across my recollection in retrograde succession; not, however, in mere outline, as here stated, but the picture filled up with every minute and collateral feature.

In short, the whole period of my existence seemed to be placed before me in a kind of panoramic review, and each act of it seemed to be accompanied by some reflection on its cause, or its consequences; indeed, many trifling events which had been long forgotten then crowded into my imagination, and with the character of recent familiarity.

The length of time that was occupied by this deluge of ideas, or rather the shortness of time into which they were condensed, I cannot now state with precision, yet certainly not two minutes could not have elapsed from the moment of suffocation to that of my being hauled up."

== See also ==
- Aerial toll house
- Clinical death
- Flashback
- Out-of-body experiences
- Effects of adrenaline on human memory
- Terminal lucidity
- Defending Your Life
- Astral projection
