= Silver cord =

Astral "cord" between physical and spiritual bodies

In metaphysical studies and literature, the silver cord, also known as the sutratma or life thread of the antahkarana, refers to a life-giving linkage from the higher self (atma) down to the physical body. It also refers to an extended synthesis of this thread and a second (the consciousness thread, passing from the soul to the physical body) that connects the physical body to the etheric body, onwards to the astral body and finally to the mental body.

In other sources, it is described as a strong, silver-colored, elastic cord which joins a person's physical body to its astral body (a manifestation of the physical body that is less distinct).

== Astral projection ==
During astral projection and out-of-body experiences, some claim they can (at will or otherwise) see a silver cord linking their astral form to their physical body. This cord mainly appears to a beginning projector as an assurance they will not become lost.

Others asserted, though, that the cases of silver cord observations during out-of-body experiences and astral projections are rare; rather, no astral body is observed and the projector sees himself or herself as a "disembodied awareness or a point of view" in most cases.

Passing through a tunnel is compared to the birth canal, and the silver cord resembling the umbilical cord⁣ – these are a few observations during out-of-body experiences that are sometimes likened to childbirth. "Birth theories" hypothesized that people who were delivered by Caesarean section do not have tunnel experiences during astral projections. On the contrary, one study showed that there is no discrepancy between the experiences observed by people who are born through Caesarean section and those born naturally during their out-of-body experience or astral projection.

The attachment point of the cord to the astral body differs, not only between projectors, but also from projection to projection. These points correspond to major chakra positions. According to the observations of Robert Bruce, there is not a single point of connection to the denser body, but rather a locally converging collection of strands leading out of all the major chakras, and some minor ones (Astral Dynamics, p398).

The silver cord is mentioned by mystics, especially in contexts of dying and of near-death experiences. It is said that the cord must remain connected to the astral and the physical bodies during the projection because if it breaks, the projector will die. If a person gets older or if their death is near, the astral body slowly separates itself from the physical body and the silver cord breaks, making a complete and irreversible separation of the two bodies. In this situation, the idea of death and dying is interpreted as a "permanent astral projection" that cannot be undone.

== Origin of the term ==
The term is derived from Ecclesiastes 12:6-7 in the Jewish Bible or Christian Old Testament.

As translated from the original Hebrew in The Complete Tanakh:

"Before the silver cord snaps, and the golden fountain is shattered, and the pitcher breaks at the fountain, and the wheel falls shattered into the pit. And the dust returns to the earth as it was, and the spirit returns to God, Who gave it."

As rendered in the Authorised Version:

"Or ever the silver cord be loosed, or the golden bowl be broken, or the pitcher be broken at the fountain, or the wheel broken at the cistern. Then shall the dust return to the earth as it was: and the spirit shall return unto God who gave it."

Or from the New International Version:

"Remember him—before the silver cord is severed, or the golden bowl is broken; before the pitcher is shattered at the spring, or the wheel broken at the well, and the dust returns to the ground it came from, and the spirit returns to God who gave it."

These verses, Ecclesiastes 12:6-7, are variously translated, and there is a lack of consensus among Bible commentators as to its meaning. Matthew Henry's commentary, for example, states that the silver cord refers simply to the "spinal marrow."

== See also ==
- Red thread of fate

== Bibliography ==
- Fredrick, James; Tildes, Olga (1946). The Silver Cord or Life Here and Hereafter. Christopher Pub.
- Barham, Martha; Greene, James Tom (1986). The Silver Cord: Lifeline to the Unobstructed. De Vorss & Co.
