= Aether (classical element) =

Classical element

According to ancient and medieval science, aether (/ˈiːθər/; alternative spellings include æther, aither, and ether), also known as the fifth element or quintessence, is the material that fills the region of the universe beyond the terrestrial sphere. The concept of aether was used in several theories to explain several natural phenomena, such as the propagation of light and gravity. In the late 19th century, physicists postulated that aether permeated space, providing a medium through which light could travel in a vacuum, but evidence for the presence of such a medium was not found in the Michelson–Morley experiment, and this result has been interpreted to mean that no luminiferous aether exists.

== Mythological origins ==
The word αἰθήρ (aithḗr) in Homeric Greek means "pure, fresh air" or "clear sky". In Greek mythology, it was thought to be the pure essence that the gods breathed, filling the space where they lived, analogous to the air breathed by mortals. It is also personified as a deity, Aether, the son of Erebus and Nyx in traditional Greek mythology. Aether is related to αἴθω "to incinerate", and intransitive "to burn, to shine" (related is the name Aithiopes (Ethiopians; see Aethiopia), meaning "people with a burnt (black) visage").

== Fifth element ==
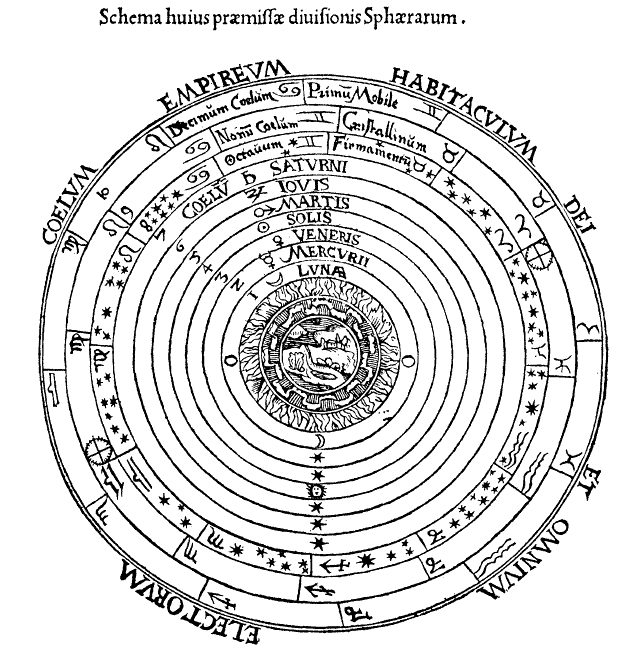
Medieval concept of the cosmos. The innermost spheres are the terrestrial spheres, while the outer are made of aether and contain the celestial bodies.

In Plato's Timaeus (58d) speaking about air, Plato mentions that "there is the most translucent kind which is called by the name of aether (αἰθήρ)", but otherwise he adopted the classical system of four elements. Aristotle, who had been Plato's student at the Academy, agreed on this point with his former mentor, emphasizing additionally that fire has sometimes been mistaken for aether. However, in his Book On the Heavens he introduced a new "first" element to the system of the classical elements of Ionian philosophy. He noted that the four terrestrial classical elements were subject to change and naturally moved linearly. The first element however, located in the celestial regions and heavenly bodies, moved circularly and had none of the qualities the terrestrial classical elements had. It was neither hot nor cold, neither wet nor dry. With this addition the system of elements was extended to five and later commentators started referring to the new first one as the fifth and also called it aether, a word that Aristotle had used in On the Heavens and the Meteorology.

Aether differed from the four terrestrial elements; it was incapable of motion of quality or motion of quantity. Aether was only capable of local motion. Aether naturally moved in circles, and had no contrary, or unnatural, motion. Aristotle also stated that celestial spheres made of aether held the stars and planets. The idea of aethereal spheres moving with natural circular motion led to Aristotle's explanation of the observed orbits of stars and planets in perfectly circular motion.

Medieval scholastic philosophers granted aether changes of density, in which the bodies of the planets were considered to be more dense than the medium which filled the rest of the universe. Robert Fludd stated that the aether was "subtler than light". Fludd cites the 3rd-century view of Plotinus, concerning the aether as penetrative and non-material.

== Quintessence ==
A stylized 𝓠 is sometimes used as a symbol for quintessence.

The symbol for aether in the works of Torbern Bergman (ca. 1775)

Quintessence (𝓠) is the Latinate name of the fifth element used by medieval alchemists for a medium similar or identical to that thought to make up the heavenly bodies. It was noted that there was very little presence of quintessence within the terrestrial sphere. Due to the low presence of quintessence, earth could be affected by what takes place within the heavenly bodies. This theory was developed in the 14th century text The testament of Lullius, attributed to Ramon Llull. The use of quintessence became popular within medieval alchemy. Quintessence stemmed from the medieval elemental system, which consisted of the four classical elements, and aether, or quintessence, in addition to two chemical elements representing metals: sulphur, "the stone which burns", which characterized the principle of combustibility, and mercury, which contained the idealized principle of metallic properties.

This elemental system spread rapidly throughout all of Europe and became popular with alchemists, especially in medicinal alchemy. Medicinal alchemy then sought to isolate quintessence and incorporate it within medicine and elixirs. Due to quintessence's pure and heavenly quality, it was thought that through consumption one may rid oneself of any impurities or illnesses. In The book of Quintessence, a 15th-century English translation of a continental text, quintessence was used as a medicine for many of man's illnesses. A process given for the creation of quintessence is distillation of alcohol seven times. Over the years, the term quintessence has become synonymous with elixirs, medicinal alchemy, and the philosopher's stone itself.

== Legacy ==
With the 18th century physics developments, physical models known as "aether theories" made use of a similar concept for the explanation of the propagation of electromagnetic and gravitational forces. As early as the 1670s, Newton used the idea of aether to help match observations to strict mechanical rules of his physics. (Note: In a 1675 paper, he also wrote a number of pages speculating that aether may explain how the soul interacts with the body.) The early modern aether had little in common with the aether of classical elements from which the name was borrowed. These aether theories are considered to be scientifically obsolete, as the development of special relativity showed that Maxwell's equations do not require the aether for the transmission of these forces. Einstein noted that his own model which replaced these theories could itself be thought of as an aether, as the general theory of relativity implies that the empty space between objects had its own physical properties (both in order to enable the propagation of light and to allow for space-time intervals). Einstein stated that he does not believe that idea of motion can be applied to the aether. Modern textbooks and scientists do not use Einstein's attempted rebranding of aether, rather characterizing the physics as space-time endowed with the various properties necessitated by the theory of general relativity; importantly, this new version of ether does not conflict with Einstein's earlier disproving of aether associated with electromagnetism.

Despite the early modern aether models being superseded by general relativity, occasionally some physicists have attempted to reintroduce the concept of aether in an attempt to address perceived deficiencies in current physical models. One proposed model of dark energy has been named "quintessence" by its proponents, in honor of the classical element. This idea relates to the hypothetical form of dark energy postulated as an explanation of observations of an accelerating universe. It has also been called a fifth fundamental force.

=== Aether and light ===
The motion of light was a long-standing investigation in physics for hundreds of years before the 20th century. The use of aether to describe this motion was popular during the 17th and 18th centuries, including a theory proposed by Johann II Bernoulli, who was recognized in 1736 with the prize of the French Academy. In his theory, all space is permeated by aether containing "excessively small whirlpools". These whirlpools allow for aether to have a certain elasticity, transmitting vibrations from the corpuscular packets of light as they travel through.

This theory of luminiferous aether would influence the wave theory of light proposed by Christiaan Huygens, in which light traveled in the form of longitudinal waves via an "omnipresent, perfectly elastic medium having zero density, called aether". At the time, it was thought that in order for light to travel through a vacuum, there must have been a medium filling the void through which it could propagate, as sound through air or ripples in a pool. Later, when it was proved that the nature of light wave is transverse instead of longitudinal, Huygens' theory was replaced by subsequent theories proposed by Maxwell, Einstein and de Broglie, which rejected the existence and necessity of aether to explain the various optical phenomena. These theories were supported by the results of the Michelson–Morley experiment in which evidence for the motion of aether was conclusively absent. The results of the experiment influenced many physicists of the time and contributed to the eventual development of Einstein's theory of special relativity.

=== Aether and gravitation ===
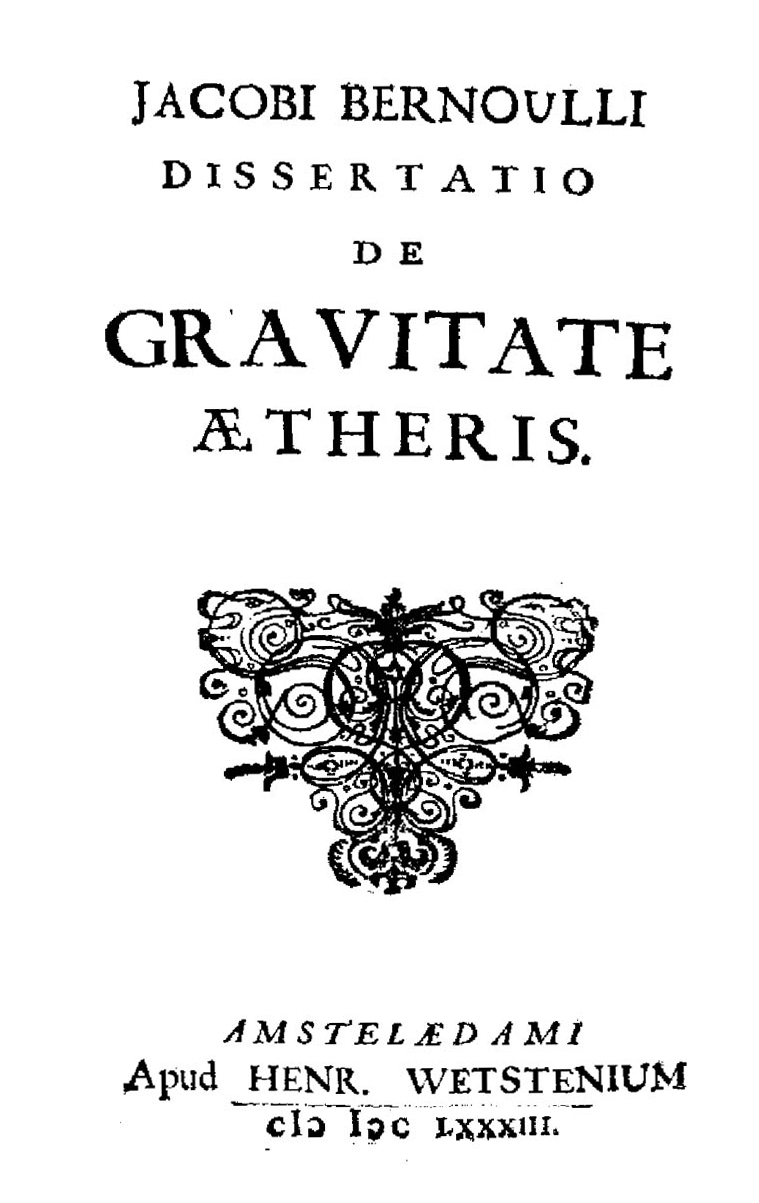
Jakob Bernoulli, De gravitate aetheris, 1683

In 1682, Jakob Bernoulli formulated the theory that the hardness of the bodies depended on the pressure of the aether. Aether has been used in various gravitational theories as a medium to help explain gravitation and what causes it.

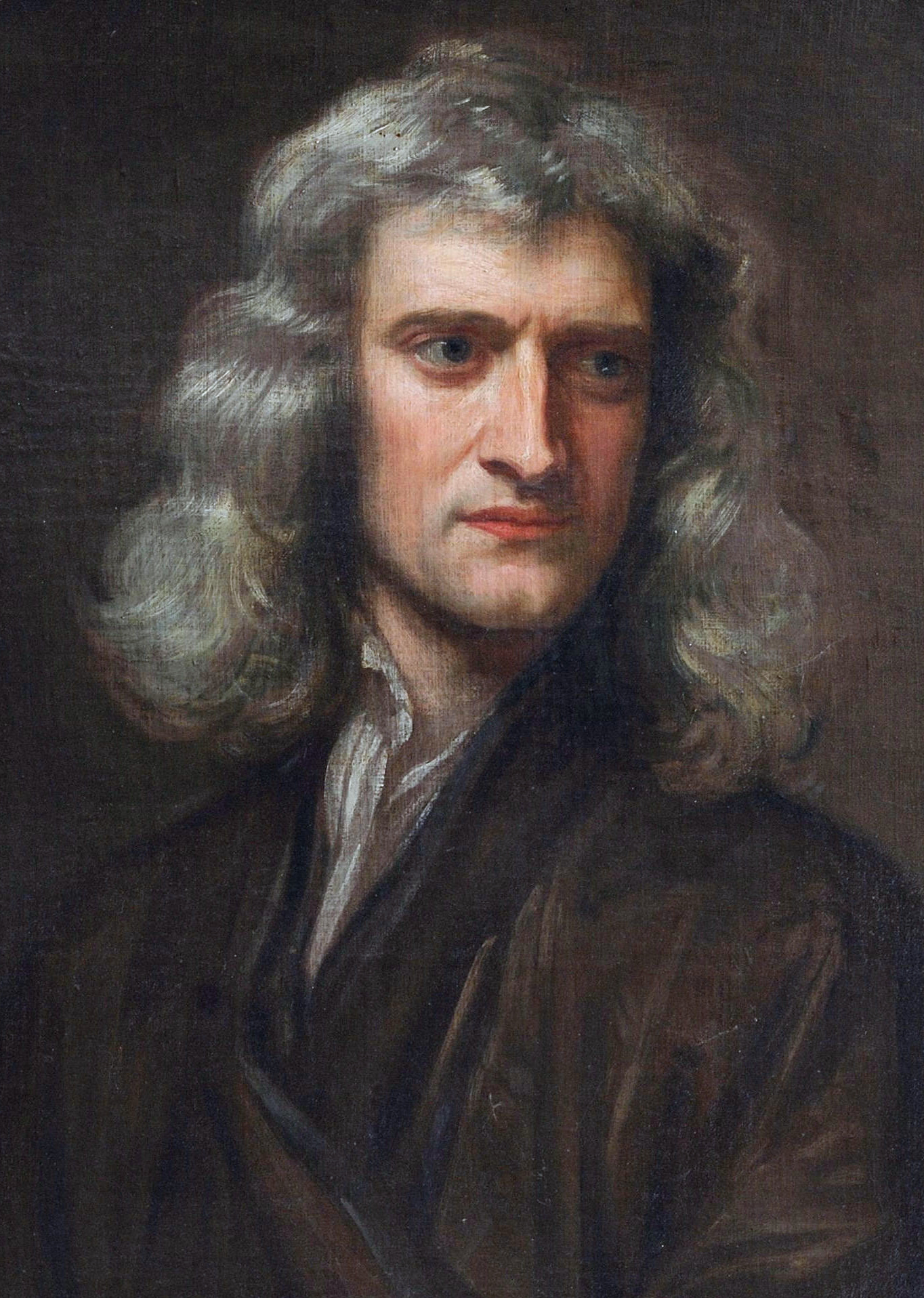
Sir Isaac Newton

A few years later, aether was used in one of Sir Isaac Newton's first published theories of gravitation, Philosophiæ Naturalis Principia Mathematica (the Principia, 1687). He based the whole description of planetary motions on a theoretical law of dynamic interactions. He renounced standing attempts at accounting for this particular form of interaction between distant bodies by introducing a mechanism of propagation through an intervening medium. He calls this intervening medium aether. In his aether model, Newton describes aether as a medium that "flows" continually downward toward the Earth's surface and is partially absorbed and partially diffused. This "circulation" of aether is what he associated the force of gravity with to help explain the action of gravity in a non-mechanical fashion. This theory described different aether densities, creating an aether density gradient. His theory also proposed that aether is rarified within objects and dense outside them. As particles of denser aether interact with the rare aether they are attracted back to the dense aether much like cooling vapors of water are attracted back to each other to form water. In the Principia he attempts to explain the elasticity and movement of aether by relating aether to his static model of fluids. This elastic interaction is what caused the pull of gravity to take place, according to this early theory, allowing gravity to be explained in terms of action through direct contact instead of action at a distance, which Newton considered "an absurdity". Newton also explained this changing rarity and density of aether in his letter to Robert Boyle in 1679. He illustrated aether and its field around objects in this letter as well and used this as a way to inform Robert Boyle about his theory. Although Newton eventually changed his theory of gravitation to one involving force and the laws of motion, his starting point for the modern understanding and explanation of gravity came from his original aether model on gravitation.

== See also ==
- Akasha
- Celestial spheres
- Dark matter
- Energy (esotericism)
- Etheric body
- Etheric force
- Etheric plane
- Fifth force
- Godai (Japanese philosophy) § Void (Aether)
- Prana
- Radiant energy
- The Void (philosophy)
