= Etheric plane =

Theosophical philosophical concept

In Theosophy, the etheric plane is the alleged subtle part of the lower plane of existence. It represents the fourth [higher] subplane of the physical plane (a hyperplane), the lower three being the states of solid, liquid, and gaseous matter. The term was introduced by Charles Webster Leadbeater and Annie Besant. The idea was later used by authors such as Alice Bailey, Rudolf Steiner, Walter John Kilner and others.

The term aether (also written as "ether") was adopted from ancient Greek philosophy and science into Victorian physics (see Luminiferous aether) and utilised by Madame Blavatsky to correspond to akasha, the fifth element (quintessence) of Hindu metaphysics.

The Greek word aither derives from an Indo-European root aith- ("burn, shine"). Blavatsky also related the idea to the Hindu Prana principle, the vital, life-sustaining force of living beings, present in all natural processes of the universe. Prana was first expounded in the Upanishads, where it is part of the worldly, physical realm, sustaining the body and the mind. Blavatsky also tended to use the word "astral" indiscriminately for these supposed subtle physical phenomena. The esoteric concepts of Adi, the Buddhic plane, the causal plane, and the monadic plane are also related to that of the etheric plane.

Leadbeater and Besant (both belonging to the Adyar School of Theosophy) conceived that the etheric plane constituted four higher subplanes of the physical plane. According to the Theosophist Geoffrey A. Farthing, Leadbeater used the term, because of its resonance in the physical sciences, to describe his clairvoyant investigations of subatomic physics.

== Christian Rosicrucians ==
Similarly, according to the Rosicrucian writings of American occultist and mystic Max Heindel there is – in addition to the solids, liquids, and gases which compose the Chemical Region of the Physical World – a finer grade of matter called ether that permeates the atomic structure of the earth and its atmosphere. It is disposed in four grades of density and is considered to be a kind of physical matter (the blue haze seen in mountain canyons is said to be in fact ether of the kind known to occult investigators as chemical ether). Associated there is also a type of spiritual sight, that man will eventually develop, called etheric vision. Ether is reported to be of four kinds, or grades of density in our planet Earth; their names (from the lowest or most dense to the highest or most subtle one) and their relation to the human being, from the point of view of these Esoteric Christian teachings, is as following:

- the "Chemical Ether": both positive and negative in manifestation and it is related to the assimilation and excretion processes;
- the "Life Ether": has also a positive and negative pole and it is related to the forces of propagation;
- the "Light Ether": the positive pole is related to forces which generate blood heat in the higher species of animal and in the human being and the negative is related to the forces which operate through the senses (passive functions of sight, hearing, feeling, tasting, and smelling);
- the "Reflective Ether": the medium through which thought makes an impression upon the human brain and this ether contains pictures which work as reflections of the Memory of Nature found at the World of Thought.

== See also ==
=== Esoteric ===
- Angels
- Astral plane
- Buddhic plane
- Causal plane
- Esoteric cosmology
- Plane (cosmology)
- Odic fluid
- Prana
- Qi

=== Physics ===
- Aether theories
- Aether (classical element)
- Luminiferous aether
- Timeline of luminiferous aether
- Ethernet

=== Fiction ===
- Ethereal Plane (a concept in Dungeons & Dragons)
