= Jan van Rijckenborgh =

Dutch mystic (1896–1968)

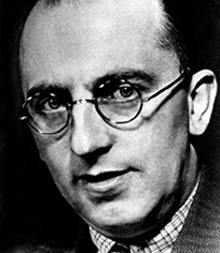
- Jan van Rijckenborgh (1896–1968)
- Born: Jan van Rijckenborgh; October 16, 1896; Haarlem
- Died: July 17, 1968 (aged 71)
- Known for: Founder of the Lectorium Rosicrucianum school

Jan van Rijckenborgh (October 16, 1896 – July 17, 1968) was a Dutch-born mystic and founder of the Lectorium Rosicrucianum, a worldwide esoteric Rosicrucian movement.

Jan van Rijckenborgh was born in Haarlem, Holland, as Jan Leene, adopting the name van Rijckenborgh later. With his brother Zwier Willem Leene, he rejected the teachings of orthodox Christianity and grew up to favour a more mystical approach. Under the influence of Dr. A. H. de Hartogh he read the theosophical works of German mystic Jakob Böhme and in 1924, with Zwier, joined Max Heindel's Rosicrucian Fellowship school of Esoteric Christianity, eventually becoming the heads of the Dutch branch.

Ultimately even Heindel's approach proved not enough for van Rijckenborgh and his brother, who left the Fellowship in 1935 to found their own Rosicrucian movement, the Lectorium Rosicrucianum. By this time they had made acquaintance with female Dutch mystic Catharose de Petri, who co-founded the Lectorium with the brothers.

== Ideas ==
Van Rijckenborgh propounded his own form of Gnostic Christianity based upon the Rosicrucian Manifestos, Johann Valentin Andreae's works The Chymical Wedding of Christian Rosenkreutz and Rei Christianopolotanae Descriptio and his own wide-ranging explorations into hermeticism, alchemy, Freemasonry, the Cathars (thanks in part to his collaboration with neo-Cathar historian Antonin Gadal), Christian Gnosticism and other forms of esoteric study. Taking the Rose Cross as his central image of the relationship between the soul and the body, he argued for the transfiguration/gnostic rebirth of the soul in man. The Lectorium was founded to study and proselytize these ideas.

Rijckenborgh's books include Dei Gloria Intacta, The Coming New Man and The Egyptian Gnosis.

== Death ==
Jan van Rijckenborgh died in 1968 and was succeeded by Catharose de Petri as leader of the movement until her death in 1990. The Lectorium Rosicrucianum, also known as the Golden Rosycross continued in worldwide operation as of 2023.

== See also ==
- Christian Rosenkreutz
- Confessio Fraternitatis
- Fama Fraternitatis
