= Confessio Fraternitatis =

1615 manifesto printed in Kassel, Germany

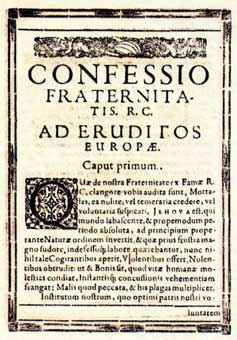
The Confessio Fraternitatis, 1615

The Confessio Fraternitatis (Confessio oder Bekenntnis der Societät und Bruderschaft Rosenkreuz), or simply The Confessio, printed in Kassel (Germany) in 1615, is the second anonymous manifestos, of a trio of Rosicrucian pamphlets, declaring the existence of a secret brotherhood of alchemists and sages who were interpreted, by the society of those times, to be preparing to transform the political and intellectual landscape of Europe.

The book is considered to be one of the three foundational manifestos of Rosicrucianism, and inspired Rosicrucian organizations such as Order of the Golden and Rosy Cross (1750s–1790s) and Societas Rosicruciana in Anglia (1865–present).

"God hath certainly and most assuredly concluded to send and grant to the world before her end, which presently thereupon shall ensue, such a truth, light, life, and glory, as the first man Adam had, which he lost in Paradise, after which his successors were put and driven, with him, to misery. Wherefore there shall cease all servitude, falsehood, lies, and darkness, which by little and little, with the great world's revolution, was crept into all arts, works, and governments of men, and have darkened the most part of them. For from thence are proceeded an innumerable sort of all manner of false opinions and heresies, that scarce the wisest of all was able to know whose doctrine and opinion he should follow and embrace, and could not well and easily be discerned; seeing on the one part they were detained, hindered, and brought into errors through the respect of the philosophers and learned men, and on the other part through true experience. All the which, when it shall once be abolished and removed, and instead thereof a right and true rule instituted, then there will remain thanks unto them which have taken pains therein. But the work itself shall be attributed to the blessedness of our age."

Signs related to the beginning of the "age" which brings the "Reformation of Mankind", first Manifesto, are described at this second Manifesto as following:

"But we confess, and witness openly with the Lord Jesus Christ, that it shall first happen that the stones shall arise, and offer their service, before there shall be any want of executors and accomplishers of God's counsel; yea, the Lord God hath already sent before certain messengers, which should testify his will, to wit, some new stars, which do appear and are seen in the firmament in Serpentario and Cygno, which signify and give themselves known to everyone, that they are powerful Signacula of great weighty matters. (...) Now there remains yet that which in short time, honour shall be likewise given to the tongue, and by the same; what before times hath been seen, heard, and smelt, now finally shall be spoken and uttered forth, when the World shall awake out of her heavy and drowsy sleep, and with an open heart, bare-head, and bare-foot, shall merrily and joyfully meet the new arising Sun."

The Confessio is a breviary about "the true Philosophy", it completes the earlier manifesto (Fama Fraternitatis, 1614) and in some way it comes to justify it, defending it from the voices and accusations already launched to the mysterious Brothers of the "Fraternity of the Rose Cross".

According to the Confessio a fundamental requisite to achieve this esoteric knowledge is "that we be earnest to attain to the understanding and knowledge of philosophy" and the Rosicrucian Brothers describe themselves as Christian ("What think you, loving people, and how seem you affected, seeing that you now understand and know, that we acknowledge ourselves truly and sincerely to profess Christ") and recommended readers to "addict ourselves to the true Philosophy, lead a Christian life".

It was reprinted several times and translated into several languages. Its author remains anonymous. Many historical figures have been attributed its authorship, including Francis Bacon.

== See also ==
- Christian Rosenkreuz
- Esoteric Christianity
- Fama Fraternitatis (1614)
- Chymical Wedding of Christian Rosenkreutz (1616)
- Parabola Allegory
- Lectorium Rosicrucianum
- Rosicrucianism
- Rosicrucian Fellowship
- Antonin Gadal
- Catharose de Petri
- Jan van Rijckenborgh
- Max Heindel
- Societas Rosicruciana in Anglia
