= Georg Kühlewind =

Hungarian philosopher (1924–2006)

Georg Kühlewind (né György Székely; March 6, 1924 – January 15, 2006) was a Hungarian philosopher, writer, lecturer and meditation teacher, who worked from the tradition of Rudolf Steiner’s spiritual science. Setting aside his early interest in music and psychology, he pursued a successful professional career as a physical chemist. Meanwhile, he continued to deepen his spiritual practice and insights. A prolific author (most of whose works are still untranslated from German), Kühlewind spent much time traveling the world, lecturing and leading workshops and seminars in meditation, psychology, epistemology, child development, anthroposophy, and esoteric Christianity. He was the author of numerous books.

Works in English translation:

- Stages of Consciousness - Meditations on the Boundaries of the Soul 1984
- Becoming Aware of the Logos - The Way of St. John the Evangelist 1985
- From Normal to Healthy - Paths to the Liberation of Consciousness 1988
- The Life of the Soul - Between Subconsciousness and Supraconsciousness 1990
- Working with Anthroposophy - The Practice of Thinking 1992
- The Logos-Structure of the World - Language As Model of Reality 1992
- Star Children - Understanding Children Who Set Us Special Tasks and Challenges 2004
- Wilt Thou Be Made Whole? - Healing in the Gospels 2008
