= Ludibrium =

Latin word

Ludibrium is a word derived from Latin ludus (plural ludi), meaning a plaything or a trivial game. In Latin ludibrium denotes an object of fun, and at the same time, of scorn and derision, and it also denotes a capricious game itself: e.g., ludibria ventis (Virgil), "the playthings of the winds", ludibrium pelagis (Lucretius), "the plaything of the waves"; Ludibrio me adhuc habuisti (Plautus), "Until now you have been toying with me."

The term "ludibrium" was used frequently by Johann Valentin Andreae (1587–1654) in phrases like "the ludibrium of the fictitious Rosicrucian Fraternity" when describing the Rosicrucian Order, most notably in his Chymical Wedding of Christian Rosenkreutz, published anonymously in 1616, of which Andreae subsequently claimed to be the author and which has been taken seriously, as virtually a third of the Rosicrucian Manifestos. However, in his Peregrini in Patria errores (1618) Andreae compares the world to an amphitheatre where no one is seen in their true light.

Paul Arnold translated Andreae's usage as farce, but this conception has been contested by Frances Yates, who took Rosicrucianism seriously and who suggested that Andreae's use of the term implied more nearly some sort of "Divine Comedy", a dramatic allegory played in the political domain during the tumult which preceded the Thirty Years' War in Germany.

Robert Anton Wilson has suggested that the Priory of Sion is a modern ludibrium:

The Priory of Sion fascinates me, because it has all the appearances of being a real conspiracy, and yet if you look at the elements another way, it looks like a very complicated practical joke by a bunch of intellectual French aristocrats. And half of the time I believe it really is a practical joke by a bunch of intellectual French aristocrats. And then part of the time I think it is a real conspiracy.
