= Fama Fraternitatis =

1614 Rosicrucian manifesto

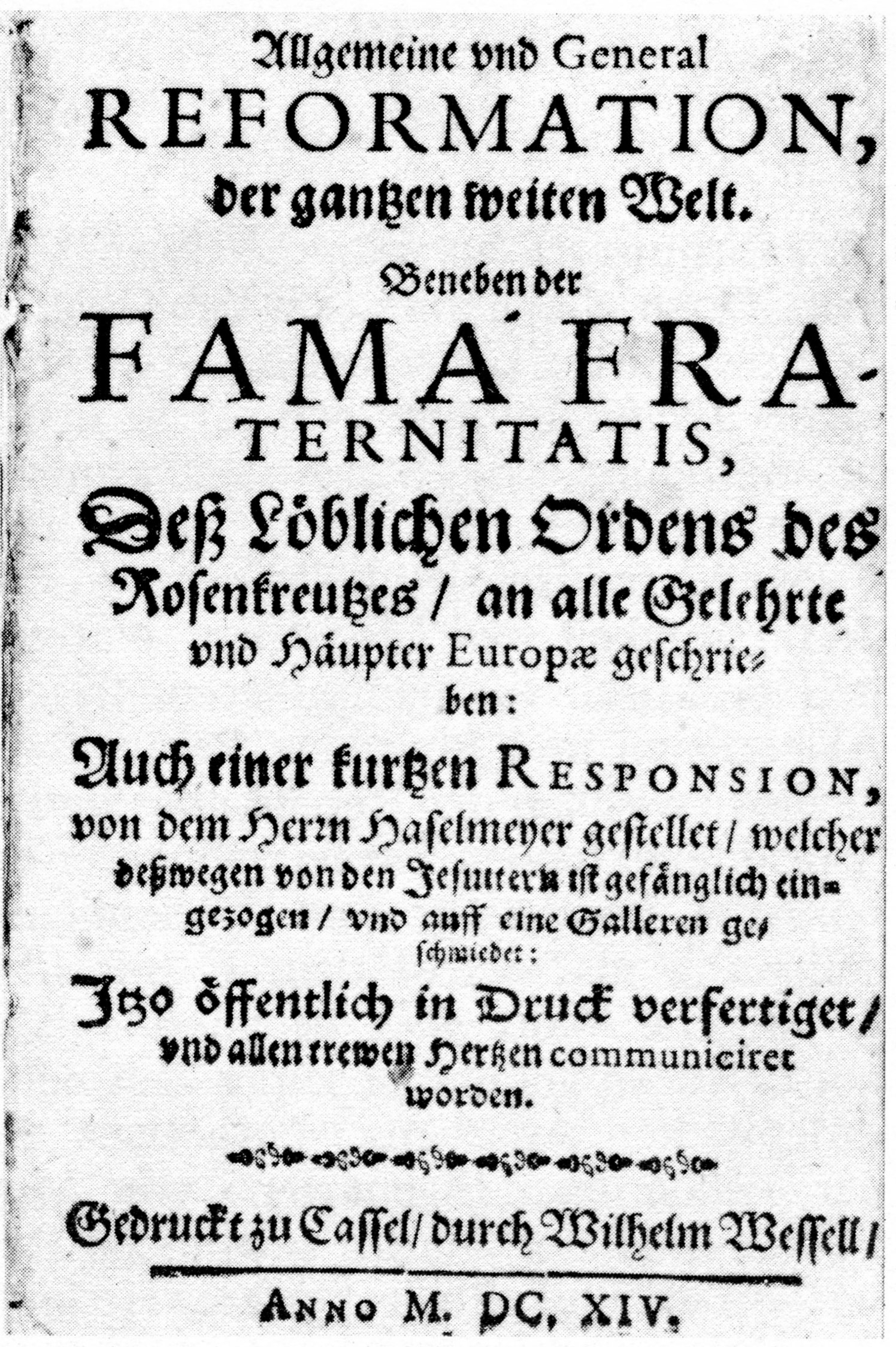
First page of the Fama Fraternitatis, 1614

Fama Fraternitatis Rosae Crucis (Report of the Fraternity of the Rose Cross) is an anonymous Rosicrucian manifesto published circa 1610 in Kassel, Hesse-Kassel (in present-day Germany). In 1652, Thomas Vaughan translated the work into English. An Italian edition was published as an appendix of the 77th Advertisement (part), under the title Generale Riforma dell' Universo (Universal Reformation of Mankind), from a German translation of Bocallini's Ragguagli di Parnasso (Advertisements from Parnassus). The Fama was soon published in a separate form.

The book is considered to be one of the three foundational manifestos of Rosicrucianism, and inspired Rosicrucian organizations such as Order of the Golden and Rosy Cross (1750s–1790s) and Societas Rosicruciana in Anglia (1865–present).

== The Legend ==
The Fama tells the story of the "Father C.R." (later referred to in the text as "C.R.C.") and his ill-fated pilgrimage to Jerusalem; his subsequent tutelage by the secret sages of the East, the wise men of Damcar (Dhamar) in Arabia, from whom he learned the ancient esoteric knowledge which included the study of physics, mathematics, magic and kabbalah; his return through Egypt and Fes, and his presence among the alumbrados in Spain. It is thought in occultism that Rosenkreuz's pilgrimage seems to refer to transmutation steps of the Great Work.

After his arrival in Germany, Father C.R. and other Brothers established an esoteric Christian Fraternity: "The Fraternity of the Rose Cross". The Brothers of the Fraternity were sent on mission throughout the world, having as their first priority to use their esoteric knowledge to cure the sick free of charge ("gratis"), not wearing any special clothing, and met once each year in the mysterious "House of the Holy Spirit".

The Legend shows an agreement with six articles that they drew up prior to their separation, bounding themselves one to another to keep:

1. That none of them should profess any other thing than to cure the sick, and that gratis.
2. None of the posterity should be constrained to wear one kind of habit, but to follow the custom of the country.
3. Every year, upon the day C., they would meet together at the house Santi Spiritus, or write the cause of their absence.
4. Every Brother should seek a worthy person to succeed him after his death.
5. The word CR should be their seal, mark, and character.
6. The Fraternity should remain secret one hundred years.

Although Father C.R.C. is often identified as the allegorical character of Christian Rosenkreuz from the Chymical Wedding of Christian Rosenkreutz, the Fama Fraternitatis does not identify him as such in the text.

== List of names in the Legend ==
The Legend presented in the Manifestos has been interpreted through centuries as texts full of symbolism. Rosicrucians clearly adopted through the Manifestos the Pythagorean tradition of envisioning objects and ideas in terms of their numeric aspects, and, on the other hand, they directly state in the Confessio Fraternitatis: "We speak unto you by parables, but would willingly bring you to the right, simple, easy and ingenuous exposition, understanding, declaration, and knowledge of all secrets."

=== In the narrative ===
- C.R.
1. I. A.
2. G.V.
3. R.C. (C.R.C.'s deceased father's brother's son): (see also description in the vault below).
4. B. (a skillful painter)
5. I.O. (P.A. was his successor)
6. P.D. (A. was his successor, and N.N. was in turn A's successor)
7. R. (successor to C.R.C.)
8. G.G.

The sentence "C.R.C.'s deceased father's brother's son" has always been a deeply enigmatic one. There is the possibility that it may refer to the rebirth process, a central tenet teaching of groups having, or claiming to have, a Rosicrucian philosophy. This would imply that "Father C.R.", possibly of the 13th and 14th centuries, would have been reborn to "R.C.", becoming the 14th and 15th century C.R.C. in the Manifestos. This appears to confirm what several later sources wrote about the Rosicrucian movement:

- According to the founder of Anthroposophy, Rudolf Steiner, the Mystery of the foundation of the Rosicrucian Order in the early 14th century relates to the birth of Christian Rosenkreuz in the 13th century, and his later rebirth in the 14th century.
- According to Maurice Magre, in Magicians, Seers, and Mystics, derived from local oral tradition, Christian Rosenkreuz was the last descendant of the Germelschausen, a German family that flourished in the 13th century. Their Castle stood in the Thuringian Forest on the Border of Hesse and they had embraced Albigense's doctrines, combining pagan superstitions and Christian beliefs.
- According to the Rosicrucian Initiate Max Heindel, the foundation of the Order of the Rose Cross occurred in 1313, early 14th century.
- According to Freemason Albert Pike, and later metaphysician René Guénon and the scholar Manly Palmer Hall, the "Adepts of the Rose-Croix" are for the first time expounded in Dante's Divine Comedy (1308–1321).

=== In C.R.C.'s vault ===
1. Fra. I.A. Fra. Ch. electione Fraternitatis caput. [elected head of Fraternity]: possibly Iohann Andreae (1586–1654)?
2. Fra. G.V. M.P.G.
3. Fra. F.R.C. Junior haeres S. Spiritus [younger heir of the house of the holy spirit]:
4. Fra. F.B. M.P.A. Pictor et Architectus [painter and architect]: possibly Francis Bacon (1561–1626)?

"Secundi Circuli"

1. Fra. P.A. Successor to Fra. I.O., Mathematicus
2. Fra. A. Successor to Fra. P.D.
3. Fra. R. Successor to Patris C.R.C., cum Christo Triumphantis [with Christ Triumphant]

The enigmatic "Fra. F.R.C." in the vault (the "R.C." in the narrative, see above) is mentioned as "heir"; this statement "younger heir of the house of the holy spirit" seems to provide evidence of the intimate relation to "Father C.R.", possibly meaning "Father R.C." [forming the C.R.C. initials]:

- The poet Fernando Pessoa — known defender of Masonic and Rosicrucian ideals and possible Rosicrucian Initiate, as he states "Initiated from Master to Disciple in the three minor degrees of the (apparently extinct) Portuguese Templar Order" (Rosicrucians seem to have had a deep presence in Portugal, intermixed with Templar tradition, and with evidence in monuments and literature, from medieval times into the 20th century) — wrote an hermetic poem titled "No Túmulo de Christian Rosenkreutz" [In the Tomb of C.R.C], which states in the final line/verse: "Our Father Rose-n-c[k]reuz [Rosaecruz] knows and keeps silent", which may attribute the whole key to the understanding of the "Fama" to the enigmatic character described as "R.C." or "F.R.C".
- The sentence "cum Christo Triumphantis" [with Christ Triumphant] may imply that the central meaning of the "Fama" is to give an account of the final achievement into the "Great Work" (the Philosopher's Stone of the alchemists, or the Holy Grail of the Templars) by C.R.C., Christian Rosenkreuz. This seems to describe that the symbolism of the unification of the "Rose" and the "Cross" (Christian Rose Cross), in the Legend, implies the existence of a Christic state (Christ, the Light of the World), which includes liberation from the cycle of births and deaths, comparable and higher than the Buddhic state (Buddha, the Light of Asia) described in the eastern sacred literature. This "Christic" process and state is pointed by major occultists as being described in some major Western literary works as the 14th-century Divine Comedy or the 16th-century The Lusiads, and, it is also, to some extent, explained in the Rosicrucian literature known as Western Wisdom Teachings.

== Origin ==
In his book The True Story of the Rosicrucians historian Tobias Churton brought to light new documents that prove the Fama was written by a group of Lutheran scholars at Tübingen in which Andreae took an active part. After one manuscript written in 1612, which was intended to be circulated privately escaped their control, the movement took on a life of its own, prompting new theories and pure speculations such as those brought forward by Émile Dantinne (1884–1969) who theorised that the origins of the Rosicrucians might have had an Islamic connection. Rosenkreuz started his pilgrimage at the age of sixteen. This led him to Arabia, Egypt and Morocco, where he came into contact with sages of the East who revealed to him the "universal harmonic science". After learning Arabic philosophy in Jerusalem, he was led to Damcar. This place remains a mystery — it did not become Damascus, but is somewhere not too far from Jerusalem. Then he stopped briefly in Egypt. Soon afterwards, he embarked to Fes, a center of philosophical and occult studies, such as the alchemy of Abu-Abdallah, Gabir ben Hayan and Imam Jafar al Sadiq, the astrology and magic of Ali-ash-Shabramallishi, and the esoteric science of Abdarrahman ben Abdallah al Iskari. However, Dantinne states that Rosenkreuz may have found his secrets amongst the Brethren of Purity, a society of philosophers that had formed in Basra (Iraq) in the 10th century. Their doctrine had its source in the study of the ancient Greek philosophers, but it became more neo-Pythagorean. They adopted the Pythagorean tradition of envisioning objects and ideas in terms of their numeric aspects. Their theurgy and esoteric knowledge is expounded in an epistolary style in the Encyclopedia of the Brethren of Purity.

The Brethren of Purity and the Sufis were united in many points of doctrine. They both were mystical orders deriving from Quranic theology but supplanting dogma with a faith in the Divine Reality. There were many similarities between the Rosicrucian way as expressed in the manifestos and the way of life of the Brethren of Purity. Neither group wore special clothing, both practiced abstinence, they healed the sick, and they offered their teachings free of charge. Similarities also were evident in the doctrinal elements of their theurgy and the story of creation in terms of emanationism. However, if one studies the Fama which was written by Lutherans, the main idea of Islamic connection is easily disproved. What was intended with the Fama was a novel in which the idea of reformation of Sciences and Arts in which a Hermetic tradition of European origin is well established.

== See also ==
- Other Rosicrucian manifestos
  - Confessio Fraternitatis – 1615 manifesto printed in Kassel, Germany (1615)
  - Chymical Wedding of Christian Rosenkreutz – Book by Johann Valentin Andreae (1616)
    - Christian Rosenkreuz – Legendary founder in the Rosicrucian manifestos
- Esoteric Christianity – Mystical approach to Christianity
- Order of the Golden and Rosy Cross – German Rosicrucian Organization
- Parabola Allegory – 17th century Rosicrucian allegory
- Rosicrucianism – 17th-century European spiritual movement
- Societas Rosicruciana in Anglia – Rosicrucian esoteric Christian order
