= Chymical Wedding of Christian Rosenkreutz =

Book by Johann Valentin Andreae

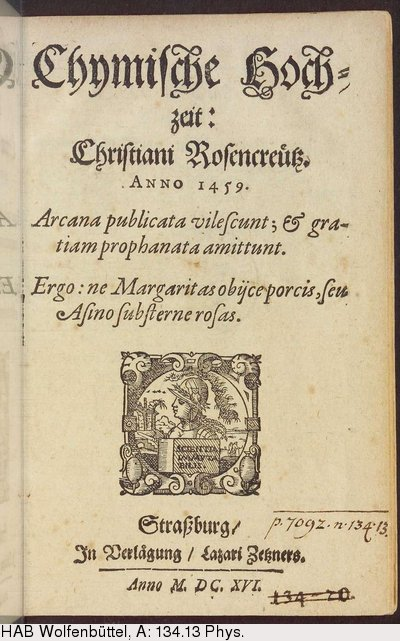
- Author: Anonymous: attributed to Johann Valentin Andreae
- Original title: Chymische Hochzeit Christiani Rosencreutz anno 1459
- Language: German
- Publication date: 1616
- Media type: Print

The Chymical Wedding of Christian Rosenkreutz (German: Chymische Hochzeit Christiani Rosencreutz anno 1459) is a German book edited in 1616 in Strasbourg. Its anonymous authorship is attributed to Johann Valentin Andreae. The Chymical Wedding is the third of the original manifestos of the mysterious "Fraternity of the Rosy Cross" (Rosicrucians), although it is markedly different from the Fama Fraternitatis and Confessio Fraternitatis in style and in subject matter.

As one of the three foundational Rosicrucian Manifestos, the book also inspired several Rosicrucian organizations such as Order of the Golden and Rosy Cross (1750s–1790s) and Societas Rosicruciana in Anglia (1865–present).

It is an allegoric romance (story) divided into Seven Days, or Seven Journeys, like the steps of the alchemical Magnum Opus as described by Paracelsus, and recounts how Christian Rosenkreuz was invited to go to a wonderful castle full of miracles, in order to assist the Chymical Wedding of the king and the queen, that is, the husband and the bride.

This manifesto has been a source of inspiration for poets, alchemists (the word "chymical" is an old form of "chemical" and refers to alchemy—for which the 'Sacred Marriage' was the goal) and dreamers, through the force of its initiation ritual with processions of tests, purifications, death, resurrection, and ascension and also by its symbolism found since the beginning with the invitation to Rosenkreutz to assist this Royal Wedding.

The invitation to the royal wedding includes the symbol invented and described by John Dee in his 1564 book, Monas Hieroglyphica.

There is some resemblance between this alchemical romance and passages in the Bible such as:

- The kingdom of heaven is like unto a certain king, which made a marriage for his son, and And when the king came in to see the guests, he saw there a man which had not on a wedding garment: (Matthew 22:2,11 KJV)
- And I John saw the holy city, new Jerusalem, coming down from God out of heaven, prepared as a bride adorned for her husband. (Revelation 21:2)

Although the book first appeared in 1616, the story takes place over 150 years earlier. The events of this story span seven days and are divided into seven chapters, each chapter relating a different day. The story begins on an evening near Easter. In the final chapter—the seventh day—Rosenkreutz is knighted; the year is 1459. The Gutenberg Bible began printing in Mainz, Germany in 1455, and the first Bible in German, the Mentel Bible, was printed in Strasburg in 1466.

The story follows the Passover and the seven days of unleavened bread exactly. The slaughtering and roasting of the paschal lamb begins in the evening (near Easter), as does The Chymical Wedding. The Chymical Wedding begins in the evening with Rosenkreutz sitting at a table with both the paschal lamb and the unleavened bread. This would seem to indicate that he was Jewish. However, the words "Father of Lights" are curiously in the first paragraph. This phrase, "Father of Lights", appears only once in the King James Bible and it is in the book of James (Jas 1:17). Below is the opening paragraph of The Chymical Wedding:

On an Evening before Easter-Day, I sate at a Table, and having (as my Custom was) in my humble Prayer sufficiently conversed with my Creator, and considered many great Mysteries (whereof the Father of Lights his Majesty had shewn me not a few) and being now ready to prepare in my Heart, together with my dear Paschal Lamb, a small unleavened, undefiled Cake;

== The four paths ==
In the second chapter Rosenkreutz sits down to rest under three tall cedars. There is a tablet fastened to one of them which tells of four paths. An important point is that it's the Bridegroom (Bible) that is offering these paths. It reads as follows:

By us the Bridegroom offers you a choice between four ways, all of which, if you do not sink down in the way, can bring you to his royal court. The first is short but dangerous, and one which will lead you into rocky places, through which it will scarcely be possible to pass. The second is longer, and takes you circuitously; it is plain and easy, if by the help of the Magnet you turn neither to left nor right. The third is that truly royal way which through various pleasures and pageants of our King, affords you a joyful journey; but this so far has scarcely been allotted to one in a thousand. By the fourth no man shall reach the place, because it is a consuming way, practicable only for incorruptible bodies. Choose now which one you will of the three, and persevere constantly therein, for know whichever you will enter, that is the one destined for you by immutable Fate, nor can you go back in it save at great peril to life.

The first path leads to rocky places and this is reminiscent of Peter, "the rock" as he's portrayed in the synoptic gospels. The second path in the text is the path taught in John's gospel, as Rosenkreutz is told not to turn to the left or right on this path and John's is the only account not to mention two men crucified to the right and to the left of Jesus while on the cross as thieves (John 20:18). The third path would be the general letters of Peter, James, Jude, and John. In the letter of James we find reference to the royal way or royal law (Jas 2:8). In the second letter of Peter we find the only reference to one in a thousand (II Pet 3:8). The fourth path is the letters of Paul. This is where one finds the teaching of the dead raised incorruptible (I Cor 15:52), and the only place that the word "consuming" appears in the New Testament (Heb 12:29).

The story then continues, Whereupon I presently drew out my bread and cut a slice of it. It shouldn't go unnoticed that, after reading this tablet, Rosenkreutz cuts the bread. Symbol XXIV of the symbols of Pythagoras indicates "Never break the bread". Bread is broken in the gospels of Mark, Luke, and Matthew; however bread is never broken in John's gospel. Bread is also broken in the letters of Paul and the Book of Acts; however bread is never broken in the general letters of Peter, James, Jude and John. As the story proceeds it's evident that CRC took the second path with the following words, yet I still proceeded with my compass, and would not budge one step from the Meridian Line. Meaning that Rosenkreutz didn't turn to the left or right. It's also noteworthy that CRC says, "I patiently took up my cross, got up onto my feet". Only in John's gospel did Jesus bear the cross. It was Simon of Cyrene who bore the cross for Jesus in Mark, Luke and Matthew's gospels.

== The Nine Lords ==
The Nine Lords are nine books of the New Testament: I Peter, II Peter, James, Jude, I John, II John, III John, the Gospel of John and the Revelation. Rosenkreutz believed that the Gospel of John is the only gospel that is historically plausible, and that it is the unleavened bread and its relationship to the Passover that truly divides John's gospel from the synoptic Gospels. The Nine Lords were bound together with the rest that were at the table (27 total) and Rosenkreutz cried.

There remained nine of us, and among the rest he who discoursed with me at the table too. But although our small tapers did not leave us, yet soon after an hour's time one of the aforementioned pages came in, and, bringing a great bundle of cords with him, first demanded of us whether we had concluded to stay there; when we had affirmed this with sighs, he bound each of us in a particular place, and so went away with our small tapers, and left us poor wretches in darkness. Then some first began to perceive the imminent danger, and I myself could not refrain from tears. For although we were not forbidden to speak, yet anguish and affliction allowed none of us to utter one word. For the cords were so wonderfully made that none could cut them, much less get them off his feet. Yet this comforted me, that still the future gain of many a one who had now taken himself to rest, would prove very little to his satisfaction.

== Historical context ==
The Chymical Wedding of Christian Rosenkreutz first appeared in Strasbourg in the year 1616. It was written in German and entitled Chymische Hochzeit Christiani Rosencreutz anno 1459. No author was named in the book, other than Christian Rosenkreutz, but Johannes Valentinus Andreae (1586–1654) claimed to be the author, in his autobiography. The first English version appeared in 1690, by Ezechiel Foxcroft, followed by translations into many languages throughout time.

== See also ==
- Esoteric Christianity – Mystical approach to Christianity
- Hermeticism – Philosophy based on the teachings of Hermes Trismegistus
- Kabbalah – Type of Jewish mysticism
- Parabola Allegory – 17th century Rosicrucian allegory
- Societas Rosicruciana in Anglia – Rosicrucian esoteric Christian order
