= Sacred mysteries =

Inexplicable or secret religious phenomena

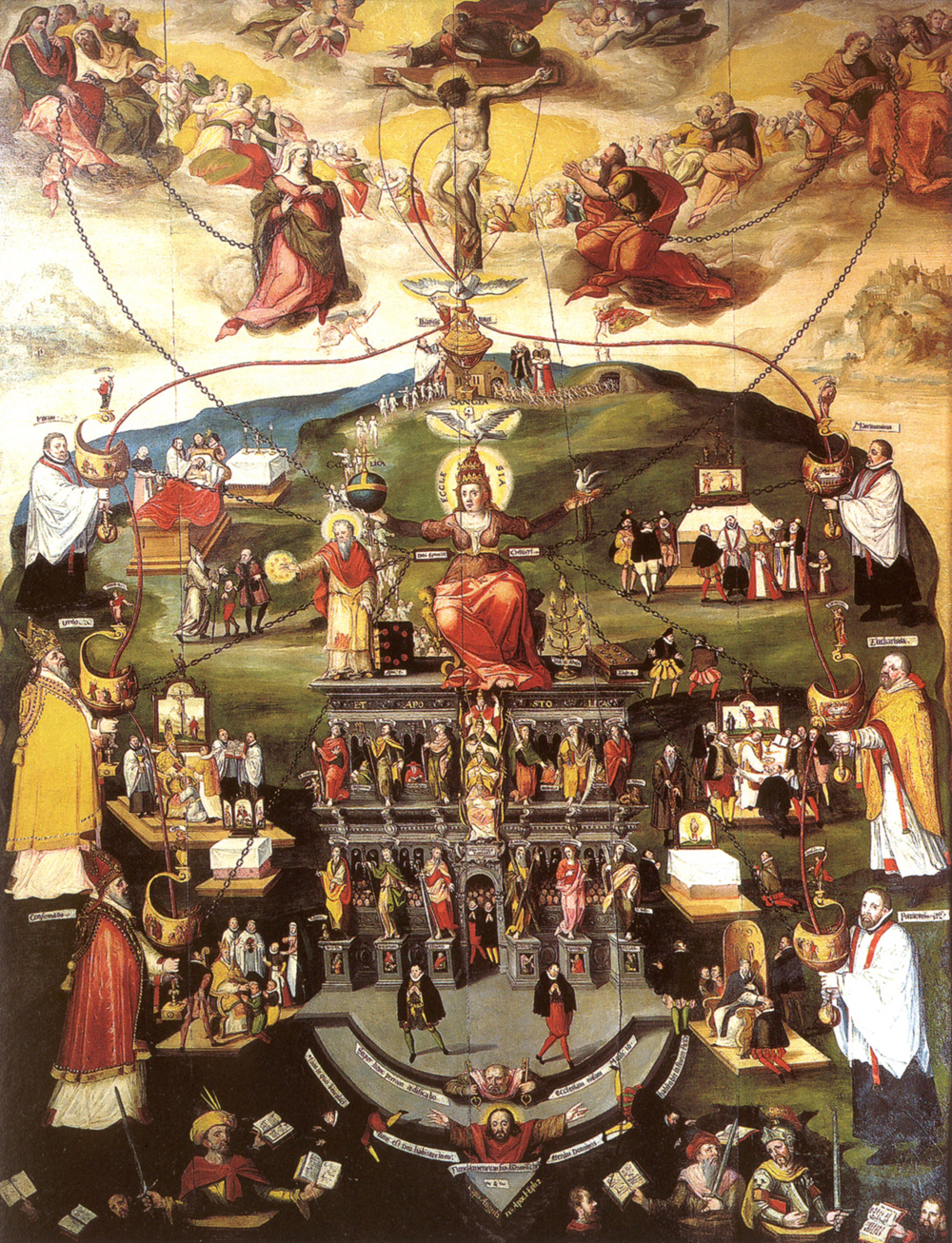
Wrisberg epitaph in Hildesheim Cathedral, showing distribution of the divine graces by means of the church and the sacraments, or mysteries. By Johannes Hopffe 1585.

Sacred mysteries are the areas of supernatural phenomena associated with a divinity or a religious belief and praxis. Sacred mysteries may be either:

1. Religious beliefs, rituals or practices which are kept secret from the uninitiated.
2. Beliefs of the religion which are public knowledge but cannot be easily explained by normal rational or scientific means.

A mystagogue or hierophant is a holder and teacher of secret knowledge in the former sense above, while mysticism may be defined as an area of philosophical or religious thought focusing on mysteries in the latter sense.

== Greece and Rome ==
The mystery religions of antiquity were religious cults which required initiation to be accepted as new member. Some had different levels of initiation, as well as doctrines which were mysteries in the sense of requiring supernatural explanation. In some, parts of the doctrine were apparently only known to priests. They included the Eleusinian Mysteries, Mithraism, the Cult of Isis, and the Cult of Sol Invictus. Mystery traditions were popular in ancient Greece and during the height of the Roman Empire, and parts of Early Christianity used secrecy in the same way.

=== Modern Roman religion ===
Nowadays, Pietas Comunità Gentile, actively contributes to the contemporary continuity of ancient mystery cults through initiatives such as the Dionisiache, held in the cloister of the former Convent of the Reformed Fathers in Pulsano, in collaboration with local institutions and the Pulsano Archaeological Museum. The event, dedicated to Artemis and Dionysus, offered a symbolic and ritual reinterpretation of Roman religion, featuring elements inspired by initiatory practices—such as shamanic drumming, sacred chants, and nocturnal rites under the moon. As a national and international organization, Pietas has also constructed two active temples in the Ionian region dedicated to Apollo and Minerva, promoting a concrete revival of cultus deorum and its esoteric archetypes.

== Christianity ==
The Greek word (μυστήριον) mysterion is used 27 times in the New Testament. Strong's Concordance defines Greek word mysterion (Strongs # 3466) "not as something unknowable, but rather a secret, that which can only be known through revelation, i.e. because God reveals it." Its meaning is less expressed by the modern usage of mystery (what is not understood) than by the word mystical (beyond understanding). In the biblical Greek, the term refers to "that which awaits disclosure or interpretation".

On the other hand, most Christian traditions hold that many of the basic aspects of Christian theology are more than just secrets — they cannot be explained or apprehended by mundane reason, including the nature of the Trinity, the virgin birth of Jesus, and the resurrection of Jesus.

In the Catholic church, the Latin term is mysterium fidei, "mystery of faith", defined in the Catechism of the Catholic Church (1997) to mean a mystery hidden in God, which can never be known unless revealed by God.

In the Roman Catholic Church the First Vatican Council re-affirmed the existence of mysteries as a doctrine of Catholic faith as follows: "If any one say that in Divine Revelation there are contained no mysteries properly so called (vera et proprie dicta mysteria), but that through reason rightly developed (per rationem rite excultam) all the dogmas of faith can be understood and demonstrated from natural principles: let him be anathema" (Sess. III, De fide et ratione, can. i). The position, if not the terminology, of other Christian churches is essentially the same.

In parts of the Early Christian Church, many aspects of Christian theology, including some sacraments and sacramentals, the so-called disciplina arcani, were kept hidden from pagans lest they become objects of ridicule, and were also introduced gradually to catechumens or new converts. As the Age of Persecution ended, secrecy was gradually relaxed. But the term continued to be used, and the same word is used in the Eastern Orthodox churches to mean both "mysteries" and "sacraments". This is not usually so in the West, although theologically many aspects of sacraments are recognized as mysteries in the main sense described above, especially (for those churches accepting it) the doctrine of transubstantiation in the Eucharist. Hence Pope Paul VI's papal encyclical of 3 September 1965 on the Eucharist was titled, from its opening words, Mysterium fidei. In the Roman Rite Catholic Mass within or immediately after the formula of consecration of the wine, the celebrant says "The mystery of faith". Originally the term "Mystery" was used for the sacraments generally in both the East and the West, as shown from the "Mystagogical Homilies" of St. Cyril of Jerusalem and the work, On the Mysteries by St. Ambrose of Milan.

Although all the official doctrines of Christian churches have long been fully public, the loosely defined area of Christian thought called Christian mysticism often concerns the contemplation of sacred mysteries and may include the development of personal theories about them, undertaken in the knowledge that they can never be fully apprehended by man.

=== Eastern ===
The term is used in Eastern Christianity to refer to what the Western Church currently calls sacraments and sacramentals, terms which the Western Church has carefully defined in canon law. Thus, for instance, the Council of Trent declared there to be exactly seven sacraments. The Eastern Churches, in contrast, have never defined the Mysteries in such precise terms. And, although the Western Church teaches that the consecrated bread and wine of the Eucharist are one sacrament, the Divine Liturgy refers to the Eucharist as the Mysteries, in the plural. Orthodox Christians have always received Holy Communion in both species (both the body and the blood), and even reserve both in the tabernacle. The sacred mysteries can be defined as "those holy acts through which the Holy Spirit mysteriously and invisibly confers Grace (the saving power of God) upon man".

Orthodox instructional materials may list seven sacred mysteries, the same as the Western seven sacraments (Western names in parentheses): Baptism, Chrismation (Confirmation), Confession (Penance, Reconciliation), Holy Communion (Eucharist), Marriage (Holy Matrimony), Ordination (Holy Orders), and Unction (Anointing of the Sick, formerly Extreme Unction). However, in Orthodox theology the term is not limited to these seven. As in the West, all faithful men are expected to receive six of the seven listed above, and may or may not receive either marriage or ordination, or both; women may not be received into the priesthood, but may be given monastic orders.

Christian life is centered in the mystery of the incarnation of Christ, the union of God and man. However, the redemption of man is not considered to have taken place only in the past, but continues to this day through theosis. The Sacraments, or Sacred Mysteries are the most important means by which the faithful may obtain union with God, provided they are received with faith after appropriate preparation. Christians believe that God is present everywhere and fills all things by his divine grace, and that all of creation is, in some sense, a "sacrament". However, they believe that "He is more specifically and intensively present in [those] particular and reliable manners which He Himself has established," i.e., in the Sacred Mysteries.

Kallistos Ware stated in The Orthodox Way:

A mystery is [...] revealed for our understanding, but which we never understand exhaustively because it leads into the depth or the darkness of God. The eyes are closed—but they are also opened.
