= Disciplina arcani =

Limited Christian teaching for outsiders

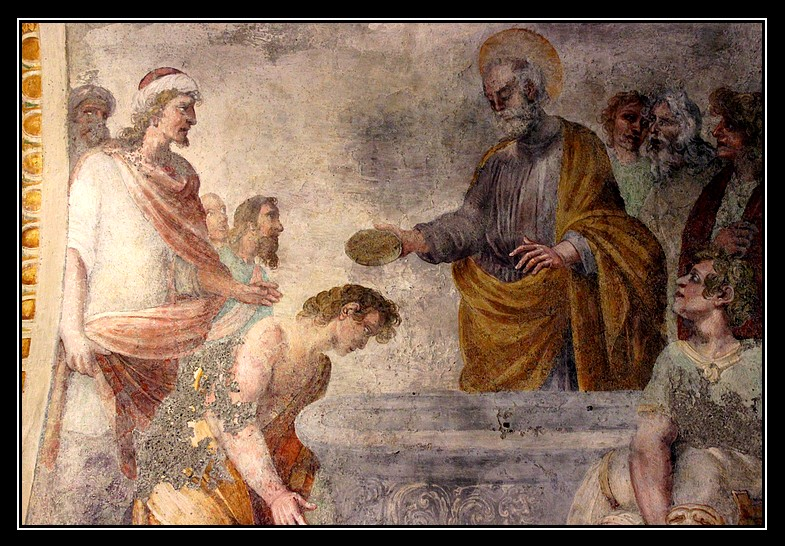
Baptism in the ancient church

Disciplina arcani (Latin for "discipline of the secret") was a custom that prevailed in the 4th and 5th centuries of Christianity, whereby knowledge of certain doctrines and rites of the Christian religion was kept from non-Christians and even from those who were undergoing instruction in the faith so that they may progressively learn the teachings of the faith and not fall to heresy due to simplistic misunderstandings (hence, doctrines were kept from catechumens, Christian converts who had not yet been baptized).

== Historiography ==
The term disciplina arcani is not ancient. It was coined by the Calvinist writer Jean Daillé in the 17th century. The concept, however, was first proposed by another Calvinist, Isaac Casaubon, in 1614 as a way of explaining the absence of certain doctrines in early Christian writings. On his view, the Church Fathers were imitating the Roman mystery religions. Daillé held that the purpose of the disciplina was to increase the reverence for the sacraments. The Catholic theologian Emmanuel Schelstrate, however, rejected Casaubon's view that it owed anything to the mystery religions. He believed it had been taught by Jesus and practiced by the Apostles. He explained the absence of references to Catholic dogma like the Mass, transubstantiation and the cult of saints by recourse to the disciplina arcani.

== History ==
In the 2nd century, Christians freely communicated rites such as baptism and the Eucharist with pagan groups. Justin Martyr, for example, freely spoke with a pagan audience regarding the rite of the Eucharist. The disciplina arcani began to emerge in the 3rd century. Some have suggested Tertullian as the earliest witness to the practice, although recent scholars have noted Tertullian's belief that Christian teachings were public and should be taught in public. Later, in the middle of the 3rd century, Origen of Alexandria addressed the polemics against Christianity by the pagan Celsus in his Contra Celsum. Celsus accused Christianity of being a religion of secrecy like the Greco-Roman mysteries, and Origen replied that while the prominent doctrines of Christianity are well-known to the entire world, including the virgin birth, crucifixion, resurrection, punishment of the wicked and rewarding of the just, there are a few elements that must be retained within the group. Near the time of Origen, Hippolytus of Rome wrote at the end of his account of the rite of baptism:

If anything needs to be explained, let the bishop speak in private to those who have received baptism. Those who are not Christians are not told unless they first receive baptism. This is the white stone in which John spoke of; A new name is written on it which no one knows except him who receives the stone. (Ap. Trad. 23:14)

By the fourth century and first half of the fifth century, the practice of disciplina arcani had become universal and is attested in Rome (in the writings of Ambrose), Jerusalem (in the writings of Cyril and Egeria), Egypt, Constantinople, Cappadocia, North Africa, etc. There is evidence that Christians were careful to maintain specific articles of the religion, including removing members of the church who had not yet been baptized before the liturgical eucharist took place. Thus, the liturgy was divided into the Mass of the Faithful and Mass of the Catechumens. In Byzantine liturgy, the deacon often proclaimed, "The doors, the doors!" to signal that the doors must be watched to prevent unbaptized from participating in church activities. There may have been various reasons for maintaining secrecy of some things, including ensuring that outsiders did not attempt to use these rites to gain favours from God, or to shelter important rites from contempt. Furthermore, they also thought that one needed to experience the rite of baptism before learning about it so that teaching more efficient and successful.

By the 6th century, the practice had disappeared.

== See also ==
- Deification (Theosis)
- Esoteric Christianity
- Gnosticism
- Greco-Roman mysteries
- Mystical theology
- Patristic theology
- Sacred mysteries
- Theoria
