= Catharose de Petri =

Rosicrucian mystic

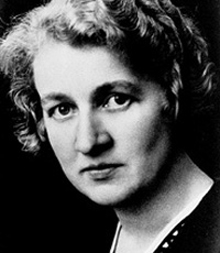
- Catharose de Petri (1902–1990)
- Born: Henny Stok-Huyser; February 5, 1902; Rotterdam, Netherlands
- Died: September 10, 1990 (aged 88)
- Occupations: Author and mystic

Catharose de Petri (real name Henny Stok-Huyser 1902–1990) was a Dutch-born mystic and co-founder of the Lectorium Rosicrucianum, an international esoteric school based on Gnostic ideas of Christianity.

Catharose de Petri founded the Lectorium in 1935 with two other Dutch mystics, Jan van Rijckenborgh and his brother Zwier Willem Leene, after meeting them as a member of the Dutch branch of Max Heindel's Rosicrucian Fellowship. The three broke away from Heindel's interpretation of the Rosicrucian message to form their own movement, the Lectorium Rosicrucianum.

With van Rijckenborgh and Leene, Catharose wrote several books on the Gnostic vision of the Lectorium, speaking of a transformation of the inner man through the Christian/Rosicrucian Gnosis. In 1956 she and the others met French historian of the Cathars and mystic Antonin Gadal, whose theories about the heretical Christian movement of the Middle Ages played a major role in the development of their ideas.

On the death of Rijckenborgh in 1968, Catharose de Petri took over leadership of the movement until she died in 1990 (Zwier had died many years earlier). The Lectorium continues their work today.

== See also ==
- Esoteric Christianity
