= Fraternidade Rosacruciana São Paulo =

The Fraternidade Rosacruciana São Paulo ("The Saint Paul Rosicrucian Fellowship" - note that "Saint Paul" is a reference to Paul of Tarsus, not to the Brazilian city) is a Christian Rosicrucian esoteric school founded in 1929 by Lourival Camargo Pereira, in the city of São Paulo, Brazil, based on the Max Heindel, Eliphas Levi, Gurdjieff, Pëtr Dem'ǐanovič Uspenskiǐ and Maurice Nicoll teachings. It is the oldest Brazilian rosicrucian organization and it was founded before the establishment of the Fraternidade Rosacruz, the Brazilian filial of The Rosicrucian Fellowship, a school of thought founded by Max Heindel. The members of Fraternidade Rosacruciana São Paulo are self-named as "Sons of Fire" ("Filhos do Fogo") and they intend to follow the lines by Max Heindel and other great masters of western occultism like Eliphas Levi as well., enforcing to be a "school" rather than a "church".

== See also ==
- Max Heindel
- The Rosicrucian Fellowship
