= Christian Rosenkreuz =

Legendary founder in the Rosicrucian manifestos

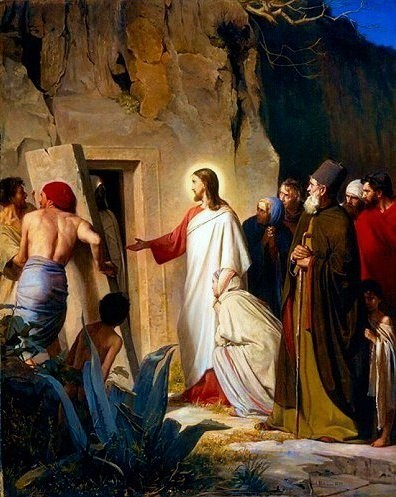
Christian Rosenkreuz is seen to have been Lazarus/St. John in his previous life, the Beloved Disciple whom the Christ had "raised from the dead" and who would remain active until the Lord's return.

Christian Rosenkreuz (also spelled Rosenkreutz, Rosencreutz, Christiani Rosencreütz and Christian Rose Cross) is the legendary, possibly allegorical, founder of the Rosicrucian Order (Order of the Rose Cross). He is presented in three manifestos that were published early in the 17th century. These were:

- Fama Fraternitatis (published 1614 in Kassel, Germany) This manifesto introduced the founder, "Frater C.R.C."
- Confessio Fraternitatis (published 1615 in Kassel, Germany)
- The Chymical Wedding of Christian Rosenkreutz (published 1616 in Strasbourg, France).

== Story ==
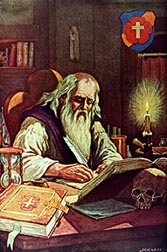
The Rosicrucian Philosopher, an image in Manly P. Hall's book The Secret Teachings of All Ages, illustrated by John Augustus Knapp

According to the narrative in the Fama Fraternitatis, Christian Rosenkreuz was a medieval German aristocrat, orphaned at the age of four and raised in a monastery, where he studied for twelve years. On his journeys to the Holy Land as well as through northern Africa and Spain, he is said to have discovered and learned various forms of esoteric wisdom. This journey, which would have taken place in the early 15th century, would have placed him among Turkish, Arab, Jewish, and Persian sages, and possibly Sufi or Zoroastrian masters. Upon returning to his homeland, Rosenkreuz founded the "Fraternity of the Rose Cross" with himself (Frater C.R.C.) as head of a group of 8 members. Under his direction a Temple, called Sanctus Spiritus, or "The House of the Holy Spirit", was built for the members to return to and meet each year.

In his tomb, discovered 120 years later by a Brother of the Order, it is described that his body was in a perfect state of preservation – as Rosenkreuz had earlier predicted — in a heptagonal chamber erected by himself as a "compendium of the universe". Inside the tomb were illustrations on the ceiling and the floor representing the heavens and terrestrial worlds, with the seven walls containing various books and instruments belonging to the order. It is described that on the sarcophagus in the center of the tomb of Christian Rosenkreutz was an altar upon which was written the words "Jesus mihi omnia, nequaquam vacuum, libertas evangelii, dei gloria intacta, legis jugum" ("Jesus is everything to me, by no means empty, the freedom of the gospel, the untouched glory of God, the yoke of the law"). These words appear to testify to the builder's Christian character, yet have been interpreted by some to bear further cosmological significance.

Rosenkreuz's crypt, according to the description presented in the legend, is located in the interior of the Earth, recalling the alchemical motto V.I.T.R.I.O.L.: Visita Interiora Terrae Rectificando Invenies Occultum Lapidem ("Visit the interior of the Earth; by rectification thou shalt find the hidden stone").

== Historicity ==
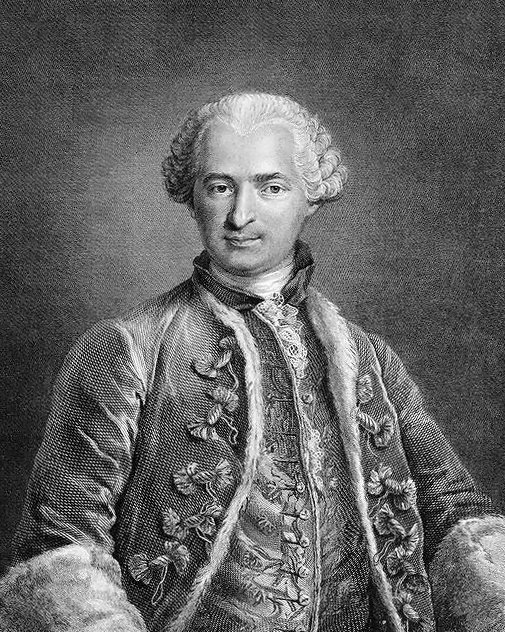
Count of St. Germain by unknown artist

No verifiable account of Christian Rosenkreuz as a real person exists. Support offered for his real personage is limited to myths and legends. For example, the writer, poet, and playwright Maurice Magre (1877–1941), treated Christian Rosenkreuz as a real person but made no reference to any source verifying his claim. Today, Magre is accepted as a writer of fantastic fiction. In his legendary account, Magre describes Rosenkreuz as the last descendant of the Germelshausen, a German family that flourished in the 13th century. Their castle allegedly stood in the Thuringian Forest on the Border of Hesse, and they had embraced Albigensian (i.e., Cathar) doctrines, combining Gnostic and Christian beliefs. According to Magre, the whole family was put to death by Konrad von Marburg except for the youngest son, who was only five years old. The boy was then allegedly carried away by a monk who was an Albigensian adept from Languedoc, and then placed in a monastery that had come under the influence of the Albigenses. There, he was educated and made the acquaintance of four of the Brethren who were to be later associated with him in the founding of the Rosicrucian Brotherhood.

Magre claims his story derives from oral tradition; however, it is likely he read the Fama Fraternitatis and invented the backstory for Christian Rosenkreuz, since Magre's account closely follows details from the Fama – except where Magre inserts details about Rosenkreuz's birth and early life. Magre appears to have been unfamiliar with the other manifestos, in particular the Confessio Fraternitatis, where details on Rosenkreuz's life differ from those stated in Magre's account. For example, Magre states that Rosenkreuz and his family lived in the 13th century, whereas the Confessio says Rosenkreuz was born in 1378 (14th century).

Some occultists including Rudolf Steiner, Max Heindel and (much later) Guy Ballard, have stated that Rosenkreuz later reappeared as the Count of St. Germain, a courtier, adventurer, and alchemist who reportedly died on 27 February 1784. Steiner once identified one of Rembrandt's paintings "A Man in Armour" as a portrait of Christian Rosenkreuz, apparently in a 17th century manifestation. Others believe Rosenkreuz to be a pseudonym used by some famous historical figure – usually Francis Bacon.

The Rosenkreuz myth has been called "one of the most successful hoaxes in history".

== Dates of birth and death ==
The Rose Cross, the central symbol to all groups embracing the philosophy of the Rosicrucians.

The year of Christian Rosenkreuz's death is not stated directly, but in the second Manifesto the year 1378 is presented as being the birth year of "our Christian Father". It is elsewhere stated that Rosenkreuz lived for 106 years, which if added to the original date would mean he died in 1484.

== Founding of the Brotherhood ==
According to the Fama, Rosenkreuz was 16 when he was in Damcar and he stayed there for 3 years. He then moved on to Egypt for a short time and then moved on to Fez where he stayed for another 2 years. From Fez, he moved on to Spain where he spent an undetermined amount of time. After Spain, Rosenkreuz returned home to Germany. Five years after returning to Germany it is stated that he founded his Brotherhood. If Rosenkreuz had spent approximately the same amount of time in Spain as he did in Damcar and Fez in the story, this might see him in his late 20s or early 30s at the time of the founding of his Brotherhood. This would place the date of its founding in or about c. 1400–1403.

== Numeric symbolism of dates ==
The details of Christian Rosenkreuz's story may be taken symbolically, seen in the light of how other hermetic or alchemical texts of its time hid details. For example, the work of Francis Bacon. These numbers and years then shouldn't be taken literally by students of occultism, who instead might consider them to be allegorical or symbolic statements to be understood by the initiated. Some might also think of the Manifestos as containing particular numerology that follows a Pythagorean tradition of envisioning objects and ideas in terms of their numeric aspects. Others may see possible symbolism through Kabbalistic gematria.

== Allegorical symbolism ==
The Manifestos are clear about their intended use of symbolism. As directly stated in the Confessio: "We speak unto you by parables, but would willingly bring you to the right, simple, easy and ingenuous exposition, understanding, declaration, and knowledge of all secrets." The metaphorical nature of the legends lends a nebulous quality to the origins of Rosicrucianism. The opening of Rosenkreuz's tomb on the other may be interpreted to represent cycles in nature or cosmic events. Some may see the opening of new possibilities for mankind consequent on the advances of the 16th and early 17th centuries. Similarly, Rosenkreuz's pilgrimage seems to refer to the transmutation steps of the Great Work.

Similar legends may be found in Wolfram von Eschenbach's description of the Holy Grail as the "Lapis Exillis", guarded by the Knights Templar, or in the Philosophers' stone of the alchemists, the "Lapis Elixir".

== See also ==
- Rosicrucian manifestoes
  - Fama Fraternitatis – 1614 Rosicrucian manifesto (1614)
  - Confessio Fraternitatis – 1615 manifesto printed in Kassel, Germany (1615)
  - Chymical Wedding of Christian Rosenkreutz – Book by Johann Valentin Andreae (1616)
- Esoteric Christianity – Mystical approach to Christianity
- Hermeticism – Philosophy based on the teachings of Hermes Trismegistus
- Rose Cross – Western esoteric symbol
- Rosicrucianism – 17th-century European spiritual movement
- Societas Rosicruciana in Anglia – Rosicrucian esoteric Christian order
