= Rosicrucianism =

17th-century European spiritual movement

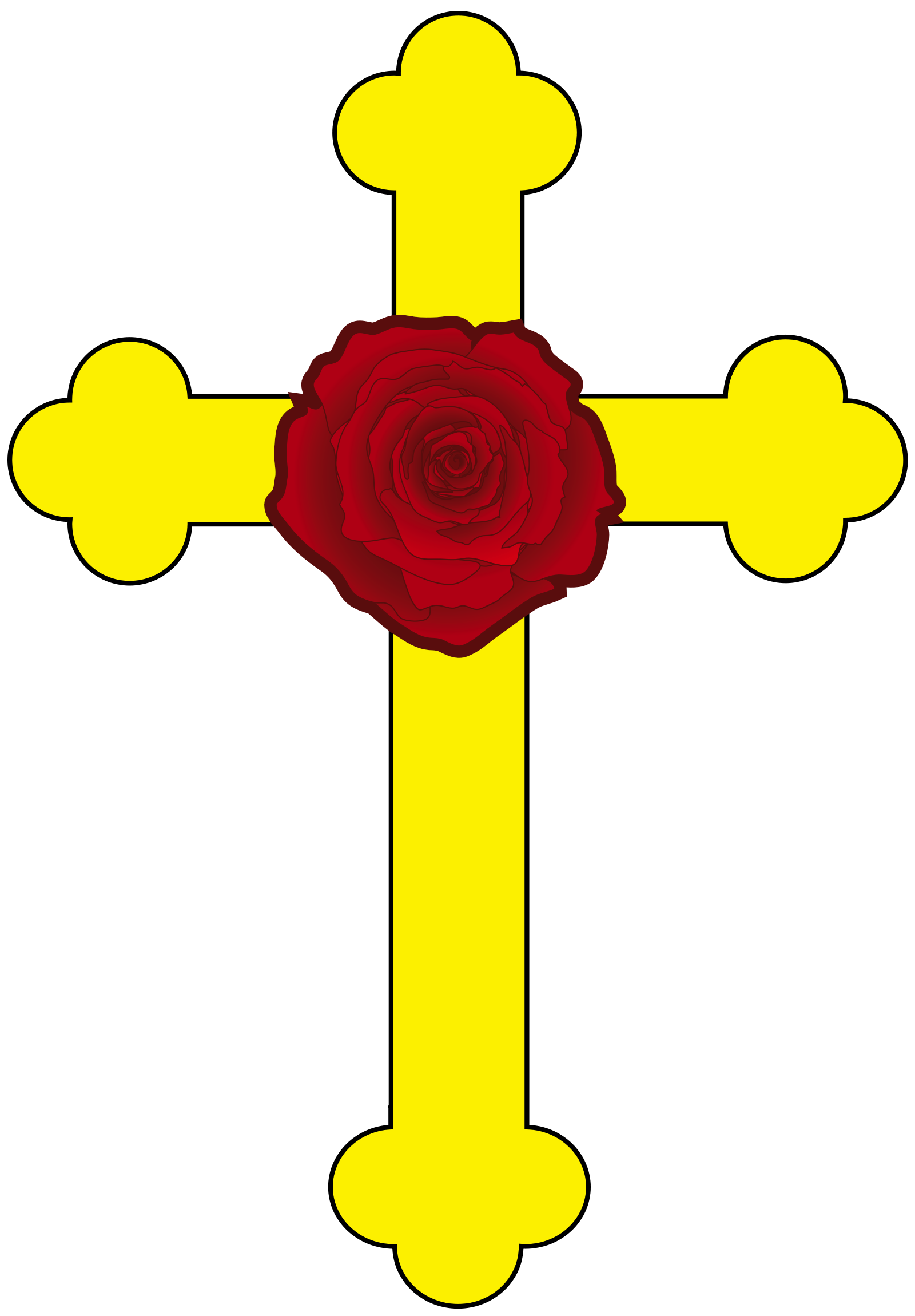
Rose Cross

Rosicrucianism (/ˌroʊzɪˈkruːʃəˌnɪzəm, ˌrɒzɪ-/) is a spiritual and cultural movement influenced by Esoteric Christianity and Hermeticism that arose in early modern Europe in the early 17th century after the publication of several texts announcing to the world a new secret society. Rosicrucianism is symbolized by the Rose Cross or Rosy Cross. There have been several Rosicrucian (or Rosicrucian-inspired) organizations since the Rosicrucians appeared as characters from literary works, including the Order of the Golden and Rosy Cross (1750s–1790s), the Societas Rosicruciana in Anglia (1865–present), and the Hermetic Order of the Golden Dawn (1887–1903).

Initially, the Rosicrucians were not supposed to be real people. The first "real" Rosicrucians appeared in the 18th century, probably in 1763.

== History ==
The Rosicrucians appeared as characters from literary works by the Learned and Christian Society.

Between 1610 and 1615, two anonymous manifestos appeared in early modern Germany and soon after were published throughout Europe. The Fama Fraternitatis Rosae Crucis (The Fame of the Brotherhood of the Rosy Cross) was circulated in manuscript among German occultists from around 1610, and published at Cassel in 1614. Johannes Valentinus Andreae has been considered the possible author of the work. A literal reading narrates the travels and education of "Father Brother C.R.C." and his founding of a secret brotherhood of similarly prepared men. Names, numbers, and other details have Qabalistic allusions, in which the cognoscenti of that era were well-versed. The Confessio Fraternitatis (The Confession of the Brotherhood of RC), published in Frankfurt in 1615, responded to confusions and criticisms and elaborated the matter further. Many were attracted to the promise of a "universal reformation of mankind" through a science "built on esoteric truths of the ancient past", which, "concealed from the average man, provide insight into nature, the physical universe, and the spiritual realm", which they say had been kept secret for decades until the intellectual climate was ready to receive it. The manifestos elaborate these matters extensively but cryptically in terms of Qabalah, Hermeticism, alchemy, and Christian mysticism, subjects whose methods, symbolism, and allusions were ardently studied by many intellectuals of the period.

In 1616 a third anonymous volume was published, the Chymical Wedding of Christian Rosenkreutz. In his posthumously published autobiography, Johann Valentine Andreae acknowledged its origin in a romantic fantasy that he wrote before he was 16 years old (1602), among other likewise forgotten juvenilia, and which he elaborated in response to the Fame and Confession, and said of it that "the Chymical Wedding, with its fertile brood of monsters, a ludibrium which surprisingly some esteem and explicate with subtle investigations, is plainly futile and betrays the vanity of the curious" (Nuptiae Chymicae, cum monstrorum foecundo foetu, ludibriu, quod mireris a nonullis aestimatum et subtili indagine explicatum, plane futile et quod inanitatem curiosorum prodat). He called Rosicrucianism a "ludibrium" (a lampoon or parody) during his lifetime, in writings advocating social and religious reform through a sectarian Christian organization of his design. Some scholars of esotericism suggest that Andreae disowned Rosicrucianism to shield his clerical career from the wrath of the religious and political institutions of the day. "[I]t is clear from his ‘Turris Babel’, ‘Mythologia Christiana’, and other works, that he considered the manifestos a reprehensible hoax." This augmented controversies as to whether they were a hoax, whether the "Order of the Rosy Cross" existed as described in the manifestos, or whether the whole thing was a metaphor disguising a movement that really existed, but in a different form.

The promise of a spiritual transformation at a time of great turmoil, the manifestos influenced many figures to seek esoteric knowledge. Seventeenth-century occult philosophers such as Michael Maier, Robert Fludd, and Thomas Vaughan interested themselves in the Rosicrucian worldview. In his work Silentium Post Clamores (1617), Michael Maier described Rosicrucianism as having roots in multiple philosophy schools from various places such as North Africa, Greece, Iran, India, Italy, and Arabia.

In later centuries, many esoteric societies claimed to derive from the original Rosicrucians. The most influential of these societies was the Hermetic Order of the Golden Dawn, which derived from Societas Rosicruciana in Anglia and counted many prominent figures among its members. The largest is the Rosicrucian Order, AMORC, a multinational organization based in Rosicrucian Park, San Jose, California, US. Paul Foster Case, founder of the Builders of the Adytum as a successor to the Golden Dawn, published The true and invisible Rosicrucian Order, elaborating the Qabalistic basis and interpretation of the Fame and Confession.

== Rosicrucian manifestos ==
=== Origins ===
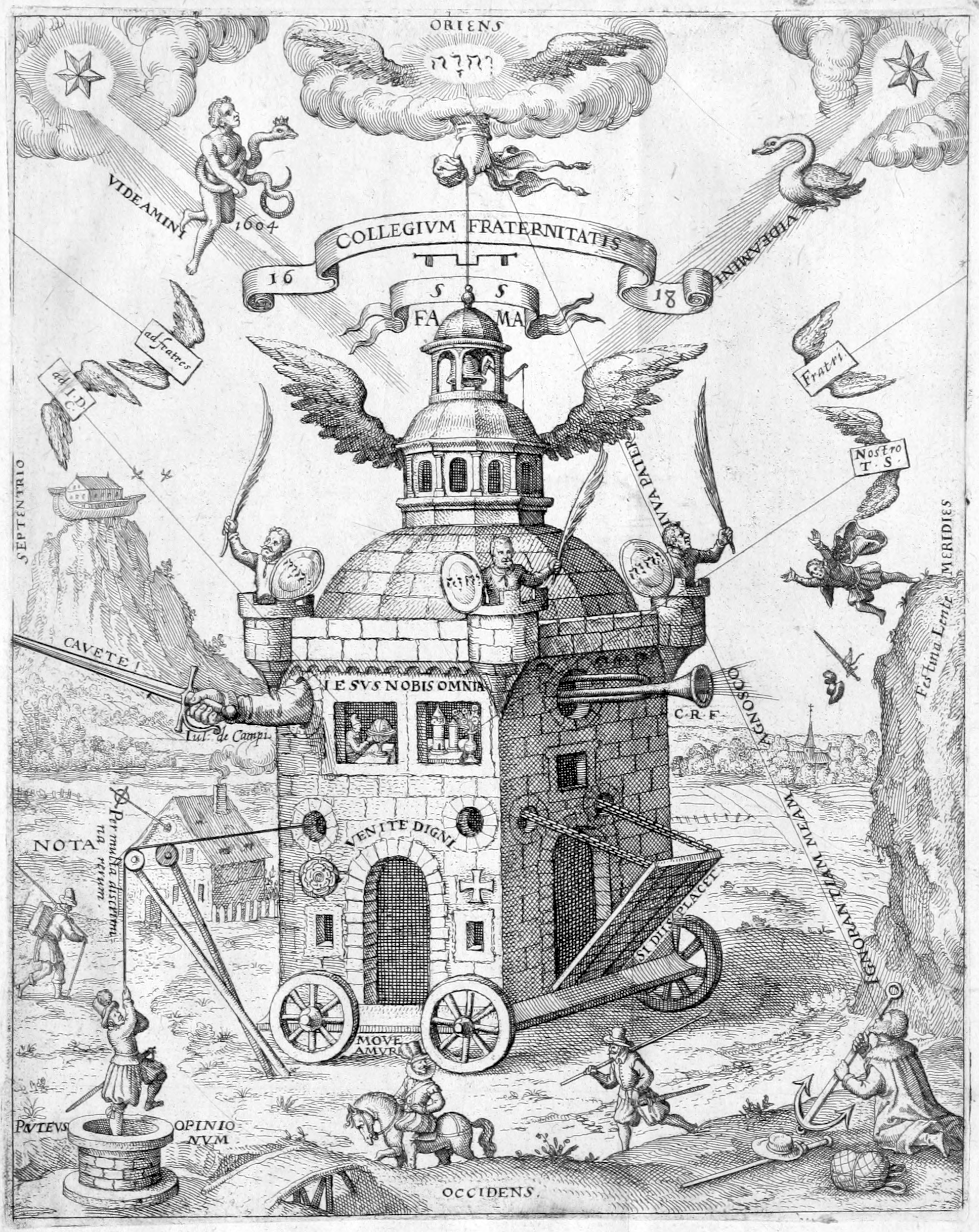
The Temple of the Rose Cross, Teophilus Schweighardt Constantiens, 1618

The Luther rose, an early symbol of both Protestantism and Rosicrucianism

Between 1614 and 1617, three anonymous manifestos were published, first in Germany and soon after throughout Europe: the Fama Fraternitatis RC (The Fame of the Brotherhood of RC, 1614), the Confessio Fraternitatis (The Confession of the Brotherhood of RC, 1615), and the Chymical Wedding of Christian Rosicross anno 1459 (1616).

The Fama Fraternitatis presents the legend of a German doctor and mystic philosopher referred to as "Father Brother C.R.C." (later identified in a third manifesto as Christian Rosenkreuz, or "Rose-cross"). The year 1378 is presented as being the birth year of "our Christian Father", and it is stated that he lived 106 years. It is said that he studied in the Middle East under various masters – a story implying a possible link to Islamic mysticism or Sufism, which influenced a number of Western esoteric traditions.

During the lifetime of C.R.C., the order was said to comprise no more than eight members, each a doctor and "all bachelors of vowed virginity". Each member undertook an oath to heal the sick without accepting payment, to maintain a secret fellowship, and to find a replacement for himself before he died. Three such generations had supposedly passed between c. 1500 and c. 1600: a time when scientific, philosophical, and religious freedom had grown so that the public might benefit from the Rosicrucians' knowledge, so that they were now seeking good men.

=== Reception ===
The manifestos were, and continue to be, not taken literally by many but rather regarded either as hoaxes or as allegorical statements. They state: "We speak unto you by parables, but would willingly bring you to the right, simple, easy, and ingenuous exposition, understanding, declaration, and knowledge of all secrets."

The first Rosicrucian manifesto was influenced by the work of the respected hermetic philosopher Heinrich Khunrath, of Hamburg, author of the Amphitheatrum Sapientiae Aeternae (1609), who was in turn influenced by John Dee, author of the Monas Hieroglyphica (1564). The invitation to the royal wedding in the Chymical Wedding of Christian Rosenkreutz opens with Dee's philosophical key, the Monas Hieroglyphica symbol. The writer also claimed the brotherhood possessed a book that resembled the works of Paracelsus. Adam Haslmayr, a friend of Karl Widemann, wrote him a letter about Rosicrucian people who revealed the Theophrastiam 24 December 1611.

In his autobiography, Johann Valentin Andreae (1586–1654) claimed that the anonymously published Chymical Wedding of Christian Rosenkreutz was one of his works, and he subsequently described it as a ludibrium. In his later works, he makes alchemy an object of ridicule and places it along with music, art, theater, and astrology in the category of less serious sciences. According to some sources, his role in the origin of the Rosicrucian legend is controversial. But according to others, it was generally accepted.

== Rosicrucian Enlightenment ==
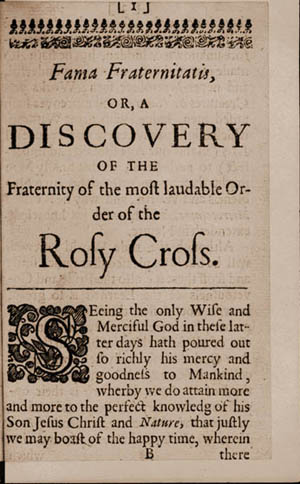
The publication of the Fama Fraternitatis Rosae Crucis (1614)

In the early 17th century, the manifestos caused excitement throughout Europe by declaring the existence of a secret brotherhood of alchemists and sages who were preparing to transform the arts and sciences, and religious, political, and intellectual landscapes of Europe. Wars of politics and religion ravaged the continent. The works were re-issued several times, followed by numerous pamphlets, favorable or otherwise. Between 1614 and 1620, about 400 manuscripts and books were published which discussed the Rosicrucian documents.

The peak of the "Rosicrucianism furore" was reached when two mysterious posters appeared on the walls of Paris in 1622 within a few days of each other. The first said "We, the Deputies of the Higher College of the Rose-Croix, do make our stay, visibly and invisibly, in this city (...)", and the second ended with the words "The thoughts attached to the real desire of the seeker will lead us to him and him to us."

The legendary first manifesto, Fama Fraternitatis Rosae Crucis (1614), inspired the works of Michael Maier (1568–1622) of Germany; Robert Fludd (1574–1637) and Elias Ashmole (1617–1692) of England; Teophilus Schweighardt Constantiens, Gotthardus Arthusius, Julius Sperber, Henricus Madathanus, Gabriel Naudé, Thomas Vaughan and others. Rosicrucianism was associated with Protestantism (Lutheranism in particular).

In Elias Ashmole's Theatrum Chimicum britannicum (1650) he defends the Rosicrucians. Some later works impacting Rosicrucianism were the Opus magocabalisticum et theosophicum by George von Welling (1719) – of alchemical and paracelsian inspiration – and the Aureum Vellus oder Goldenes Vliess by Hermann Fictuld in 1749.

Michael Maier was appointed Pfalzgraf (Count Palatine) by Rudolf II, Holy Roman Emperor, King of Hungary and King of Bohemia. He also was one of the most prominent defenders of the Rosicrucians, clearly transmitting details about the "Brothers of the Rose Cross" in his writings. Maier made the firm statement that the Brothers of R.C. existed to advance inspired arts and sciences, including alchemy. Researchers of Maier's writings point out that he never claimed to have produced gold, nor did Heinrich Khunrath or any of the other "Rosicrucianists". Their writings point toward a symbolic and spiritual alchemy, rather than an operative one. In a combination of direct and veiled styles, these writings conveyed the nine stages of the involutive-evolutive transmutation of the threefold body of the human being, the threefold soul and the threefold spirit, among other esoteric knowledge related to the "Path of Initiation".

In his 1618 pamphlet, Pia et Utilissima Admonitio de Fratribus Rosae Crucis, Henrichus Neuhusius wrote that the Rosicrucians departed for the east due to European instability caused by the start of the Thirty Years' War. In 1710, Sigmund Richter, founder of the secret society of the Golden and Rosy Cross, also suggested the Rosicrucians had migrated eastward. In the first half of the 20th century, René Guénon, a researcher of the occult, presented this same idea in some of his works. Arthur Edward Waite, an eminent author of the 19th century, presented arguments contradicting this idea. It was in this fertile field of discourse that many Rosicrucian societies arose. They were based on the occult, inspired by the mystery of this "College of Invisibles".

Some modern scholars, for example Adam McLean and Giordano Berti, assume that among the first followers of the Rose Cross there was also the German theologian Daniel Cramer, who in 1617 published a treatise entitled "Societas Jesus et Rosae Crucis Vera" (The True Society of Jesus and the Rosy Cross), containing 40 emblematic figures accompanied by biblical quotations.

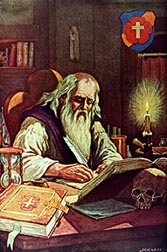
Frater C.R.C. – Christian Rose Cross (symbolical representation)

The literary works of the 16th and 17th centuries were full of enigmatic passages containing references to the Rose Cross, as in the following (somewhat modernized):

For what we do presage is not in grosse,
For we are brethren of the Rosie Crosse;
We have the Mason Word and second sight,
Things for to come we can foretell aright.

— Henry Adamson, The Muses' Threnodie (Perth, 1638).

The idea of such an order, exemplified by the network of astronomers, professors, mathematicians, and natural philosophers in 16th-century Europe promoted by such men as Johannes Kepler, Georg Joachim Rheticus, John Dee and Tycho Brahe, gave rise to the Invisible College. This was the precursor to the Royal Society founded in 1660. It was constituted by a group of scientists who began to hold regular meetings to share and develop knowledge acquired by experimental investigation. Among these were Robert Boyle, who wrote: "the cornerstones of the Invisible (or as they term themselves the Philosophical) College, do now and then honour me with their company...";

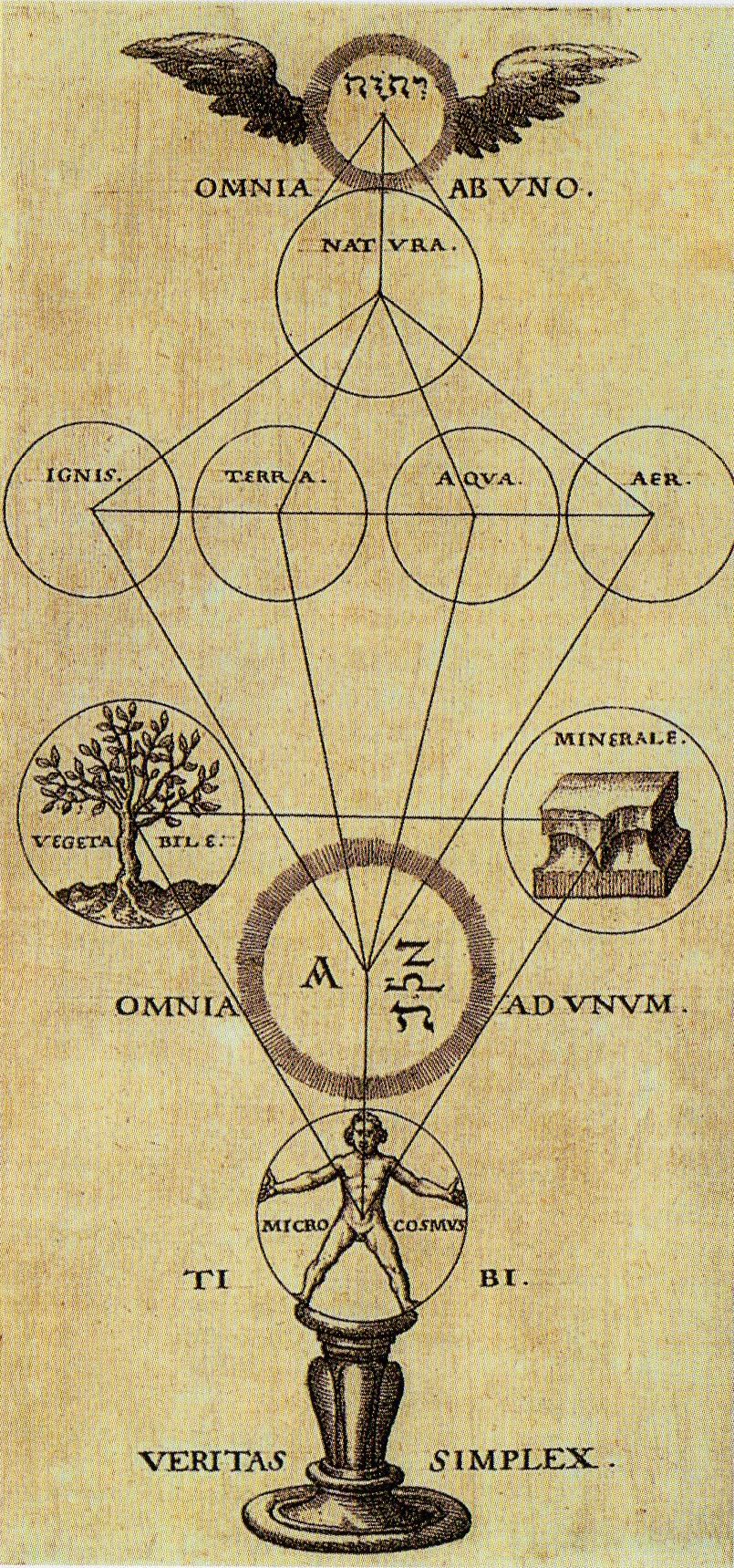
A 17th century depiction of the Rosicrucian concept of the Tree of Pansophia, 1604

John Wilkins and John Wallis, who described those meetings in the following terms: "About the year 1645, while I lived in London (at a time when, by our civil wars, academical studies were much interrupted in both our Universities), ... I had the opportunity of being acquainted with divers worthy persons, inquisitive of natural philosophy, and other parts of human learning; and particularly of what hath been called the New Philosophy or Experimental Philosophy. We did by agreements, divers of us, meet weekly in London on a certain day and hour, under a certain penalty, and a weekly contribution for the charge of experiments, with certain rules agreed amongst us, to treat and discourse of such affairs..."

The Illuminati regarded the Rosicrucians as the forerunners of the Enlightenment. The Illuminati could be understood as yet another Freemasonic or Rosicrucian utopia.

== Legacy in esoteric orders ==
=== Rose-Cross Degrees in Freemasonry ===
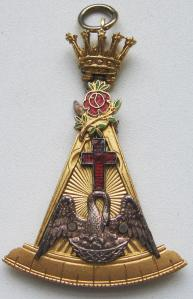
18° Knight of the Rose Croix jewel (from the Masonic Scottish Rite)

According to Jean Pierre Bayard, two Rosicrucian-inspired Masonic rites emerged toward the end of 18th century, the Rectified Scottish Rite, widespread in Central Europe where there was a strong presence of the "Golden and Rosy Cross", and the Ancient and Accepted Scottish Rite, first practiced in France, in which the 18th degree is called Knight of the Rose Croix.

The change from "operative" to "speculative" Masonry occurred between the end of the 16th and the beginning of the 18th century. Two of the earliest speculative Masons for whom a record of initiation exists were Sir Robert Moray and Elias Ashmole. Robert Vanloo states that earlier 17th century Rosicrucianism had a considerable influence on Anglo-Saxon Masonry. Hans Schick sees in the works of Comenius (1592–1670) the ideal of the newly born English Masonry before the foundation of the Grand Lodge in 1717. Comenius was in England during 1641.

The Gold und Rosenkreuzer (Golden and Rosy Cross) was founded by the alchemist Samuel Richter who in 1710 published Die warhhaffte und vollkommene Bereitung des Philosophischen Steins der Brüderschaft aus dem Orden des Gülden-und Rosen-Creutzes (The True and Complete Preparation of the Philosopher's Stone by the Brotherhood from the Order of the Golden and Rosy Cross) in Breslau under the pseudonym Sincerus Renatus in Prague in the early 18th century as a hierarchical secret society composed of internal circles, recognition signs and alchemy treatises. Under the leadership of Hermann Fictuld the group reformed itself extensively in 1767 and again in 1777 because of political pressure. Its members claimed that the leaders of the Rosicrucian Order had invented Freemasonry and only they knew the secret meaning of Masonic symbols. The Rosicrucian Order had been founded by Egyptian "Ormusse" or "Licht-Weise" who had emigrated to Scotland with the name "Builders from the East". In 1785 and 1788 the Golden and Rosy Cross group published the Geheime Figuren or "The Secret Symbols of the 16th and 17th century Rosicrucians".

Baron Schoudy (Tschoudy or Tschudi) introduced a Rosicrucian degree in Freemasonry, in 1762.

Led by Johann Christoph von Wöllner and General Johann Rudolf von Bischoffwerder, the Masonic lodge (later: Grand Lodge) Zu den drei Weltkugeln (The Three Globes) was infiltrated and came under the influence of the Golden and Rosy Cross. Many Freemasons became Rosicrucianists and Rosicrucianism was established in many lodges. In 1782 at the Convent of Wilhelmsbad the Alte schottische Loge Friedrich zum goldenen Löwen (Old Scottish Lodge Friedrich at the Golden Lion) in Berlin strongly requested Ferdinand, Duke of Brunswick-Lüneburg and all other Freemasons to submit to the Golden and Rosy Cross, without success.

After 1782, this highly secretive society added Egyptian, Greek, and Druidic mysteries to its alchemy system. A comparative study of what is known about the Gold and Rosenkreuzer appears to reveal, on the one hand, that it has influenced the creation of some modern initiatory groups and, on the other hand, that the Nazis (see The Occult Roots of Nazism) may have been inspired by this German group.

According to the writings of the Masonic historian E.J. Marconis de Negre, who together with his father Gabriel M. Marconis is held to be the founder of the "Rite of Memphis-Misraim" of Freemasonry, based on earlier conjectures (1784) by a Rosicrucian scholar Baron de Westerode and also promulgated by the 18th century secret society called the "Golden and Rosy Cross", the Rosicrucian Order was created in the year 46 when an Alexandrian Gnostic sage named Ormus and his six followers were converted by one of Jesus' disciples, Mark. Their symbol was said to be a red cross surmounted by a rose, thus the designation of Rosy Cross. From this conversion, Rosicrucianism was supposedly born, by purifying Egyptian mysteries with the new higher teachings of early Christianity.

Another notable figure for both Egyptian freemasonry and Rosicrucianism in Italy was Giustiniano Lebano who held high offices in the Memphis Misraim rite and was an influential figure in the later esoteric developments of the peninsula, including influencing Giuliano Kremmerz and the members of the UR Group. The Neapolitan branch of the Memphis-Misraim rite, Grande Oriente Egizio, instructed Giuliano Kremmerz to create the Brotherhood of Myriam with the aim of practising therapeutic magic for those affected by disease, including non-initiates.

According to Maurice Magre (1877–1941) in his book Magicians, Seers, and Mystics, Rosenkreutz was the last descendant of the Germelshausen, a German family from the 13th century. Their castle stood in the Thuringian Forest on the border of Hesse, and they embraced Albigensian doctrines. The whole family was put to death by Landgrave Conrad of Thuringia, except for the youngest son, who was then five years old. He was carried away secretly by a monk, an Albigensian adept from Languedoc, and placed in a monastery under the influence of the Albigenses, where he was educated and met the four Brothers later to be associated with him in the founding of the Rosicrucian Brotherhood. Magre's account supposedly derives from oral tradition.

Around 1530, more than eighty years before the publication of the first manifesto, the association of cross and rose already existed in Portugal in the Convent of the Order of Christ, home of the Knights Templar, later renamed Order of Christ. Three bocetes were, and still are, on the abóboda (vault) of the initiation room. The rose can clearly be seen at the center of the cross. At the same time, a minor writing by Paracelsus called Prognosticatio Eximii Doctoris Paracelsi (1530), containing 32 prophecies with allegorical pictures surrounded by enigmatic texts, makes reference to an image of a double cross over an open rose; this is one of the examples used to prove the "Fraternity of the Rose Cross" existed far earlier than 1614.

== Modern groups ==
The Well of Initiation (27 m high; 9 levels/strata) located in Quinta da Regaleira, Sintra, Portugal. It was built 1904–1910. At the bottom of the "well" is seen the Rose of the Winds (8-point compass rose: 4 cardinal and 4 ordinal directions) placed upon the Templar Cross (Cross pattée/Alisee: with the ends of the arms convex and curved, a variant used by the Knights Templar in Portugal): the Rose Cross.

During the late 19th and early 20th centuries, various groups styled themselves Rosicrucian. The diverse groups who link themselves to a "Rosicrucian Tradition" can be divided into three categories: Esoteric Christian Rosicrucian groups, which profess Christ; Masonic Rosicrucian groups such as SRIA, Societas Rosicruciana; and initiatory groups such as the Golden Dawn and the Ancient Mystical Order Rosae Crucis (AMORC).

Esoteric Christian Rosicrucian schools provide esoteric knowledge related to the inner teachings of Christianity.

The Rosicrucian Fellowship, 1909 at Mount Ecclesia (groundbreaking for first building: 1911). Teachings present the 'mysteries', in the form of esoteric knowledge, of which Christ spoke in Matthew 13:11 and Luke 8:10. The Fellowship seeks to prepare the individual through harmonious development of mind and heart in a spirit of unselfish service to mankind and an all-embracing altruism. According to it the Rosicrucian Order was founded in 1313 and is composed of twelve exalted Beings gathered around a thirteenth, Christian Rosenkreuz. These great adepts have already advanced far beyond the cycle of rebirth. Their mission is to prepare the 'whole wide world' for a new phase in religion, which includes awareness of the inner worlds and the subtle bodies, and to provide safe guidance in the gradual awakening of man's latent spiritual faculties during the next six centuries toward the coming Age of Aquarius.

Several Russians of a mystical mind took advantage of the Edict of Toleration of religion in 1905 to form or resurrect what they considered the ancient forms of esoteric Orders. These were the new Rosicrucians. Their inspired mentors compiled volumes of mystic philosophy which they combined with their personal notions of what the ancient Orders were, and so formed groups. The three principal neo-Rosicrucian Orders of early Soviet Russia were Emesh Redivivus, the Orionist-Manicheans, and the Lux Astralis. Due to suppression by the Soviets they had disbanded by 1933.

According to Masonic writers, the Order of the Rose Cross is expounded in a major Christian literary work that molded the subsequent spiritual beliefs of western civilization: The Divine Comedy (ca. 1308–1321) by Dante Alighieri.

Other Christian-oriented Rosicrucian bodies include:

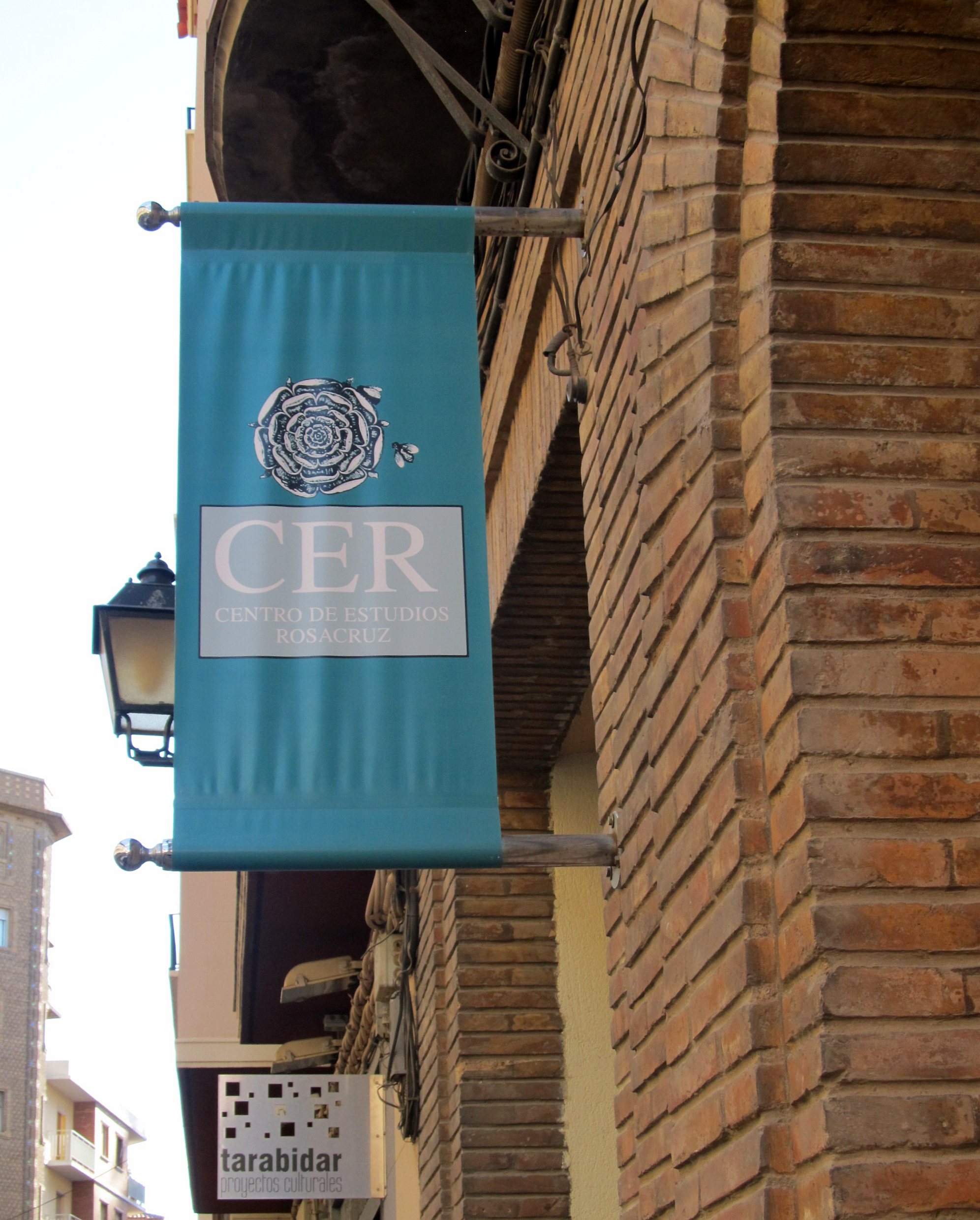
Centro de Estudios Rosacruz (Zaragoza)

- Lectorium Rosicrucianum, 1924
- Archeosophical Society, 1968

Freemasonic Rosicrucian bodies providing preparation either through direct study and/or through the practice of a symbolic initiatory journey.

- Societas Rosicruciana in Anglia, 1866
- Societas Rosicruciana in Canadiensis, 1876

Initiatory groups which follow a degree system of study and initiation include:

- The Ancient Mystical Order Rosae Crucis (AMORC), incorporated in the U.S. in 1915

=== Related groups ===
Many of these groups generally speak of a linear descent from earlier branches of the ancient Rosicrucian Order in England, France, Egypt, or other countries. However, some groups speak of a spiritual affiliation with a true and invisible Rosicrucian Order. Note that there are other Rosicrucian groups not listed here. Some do not use the name "Rosicrucian" to name themselves. Some groups listed have been dissolved or are no longer operating.

==== 18th and 19th centuries ====
Society	Founded	Status
Order of the Golden and Rosy Cross	1750s	Dissolved
Ancient and Accepted Scottish Rite	1776	Active
Fraternitas Rosae Crucis	1861	Active
Brotherhood of Myriam	1896	Active
Societas Rosicruciana in Anglia (SRIA)	1860s	Active
Societas Rosicruciana in America	1878	Active
Societas Rosicruciana in Civitatibus Foederatis (SRICF)	1878	Active
Cabalistic Order of the Rosicrucian	1888	Active
Hermetic Order of the Golden Dawn	1888	Dissolved
Order of the Temple & the Graal and of the Catholic Order of the Rose-Croix	1890	

==== 20th century ====
Society	Founded	Status
Rosicrucian Society	Rosicrucian Society 1763 in New Orleans as the Loge de Parfait -Rose Croix	Active
Rosicrucian Fellowship	1909	Active
Anthroposophical Society	1912/1923	Active
Builders of the Adytum	1922	Active
Order of the Temple of the Rosy Cross	1912	Dissolved
Ancient Mystical Order Rosae Crucis	1915	Active
Fellowship of the Rosy Cross	1915	Active
Rosicrucian Order Crotona Fellowship	1924	Dissolved
Lectorium Rosicrucianum	1924	Active
The Saint Paul Rosicrucian Fellowship	1929	Active
Fraternitas Rosicruciana Antiqua	1932	Active
Archeosophical Society	1968	Active
Fraternity of the Hidden Light	1982	Active
Confraternity Rosae + Crucis	1989	Active

==== 21st century ====
Society	Founded	Status
Order of the Hermetic Gold and Rose (RSOHGR)	2002	Active
Sodalitas Rosae+Crucis	2003	Active
Order of the Rose and Cross	2007	Active

== See also ==
- Academic study of Western esotericism
- Anthroposophy – Spiritual and pseudoscientific philosophy
- Ashrama Hall and Christchurch Garden Theatre
- Bogomilism – 10th-century Bulgarian neo-Gnostic sect
- Brethren of Purity – Medieval secret society of Muslim philosophers
- Catharism – Medieval southern European Christian dualist movement
- Druze – Ethnoreligious group of the Levant
- Essenes – Jewish sect during the Second Temple period
- Jakob Böhme – German philosopher (1575–1624)
- Manichaeism – Persian religion founded in the 3rd century AD
- Martinism – Form of Christian mysticism and esoteric Christianity
- Michael Sendivogius – Polish alchemist, philosopher, and medical doctor (1566–1636)
- Neoplatonism – Platonic philosophical system
- Numerology – Mystical properties of numbers
- Parabola Allegory – 17th century Rosicrucian allegory
- Pigpen cipher – Type of substitution cipher
- Pythagoreanism – Philosophical system based on the teachings of Pythagoras
- Rosicrucian Egyptian Museum – Museum in San Jose, California
- Rudolf Steiner – Austrian esotericist (1861–1925)
- Secret society
- Theosophy – Religion established in the United States
- Western esotericism – Range of related ideas and movements that have developed in the Western world
- Giustiniano Lebano – Italian lawyer and patriot (1832–1910)
- Giuliano Kremmerz – Italian alchemist (1861–1930)

List of general fraternities
