= Antonin Gadal =

French mystic and historian (1877–1962)

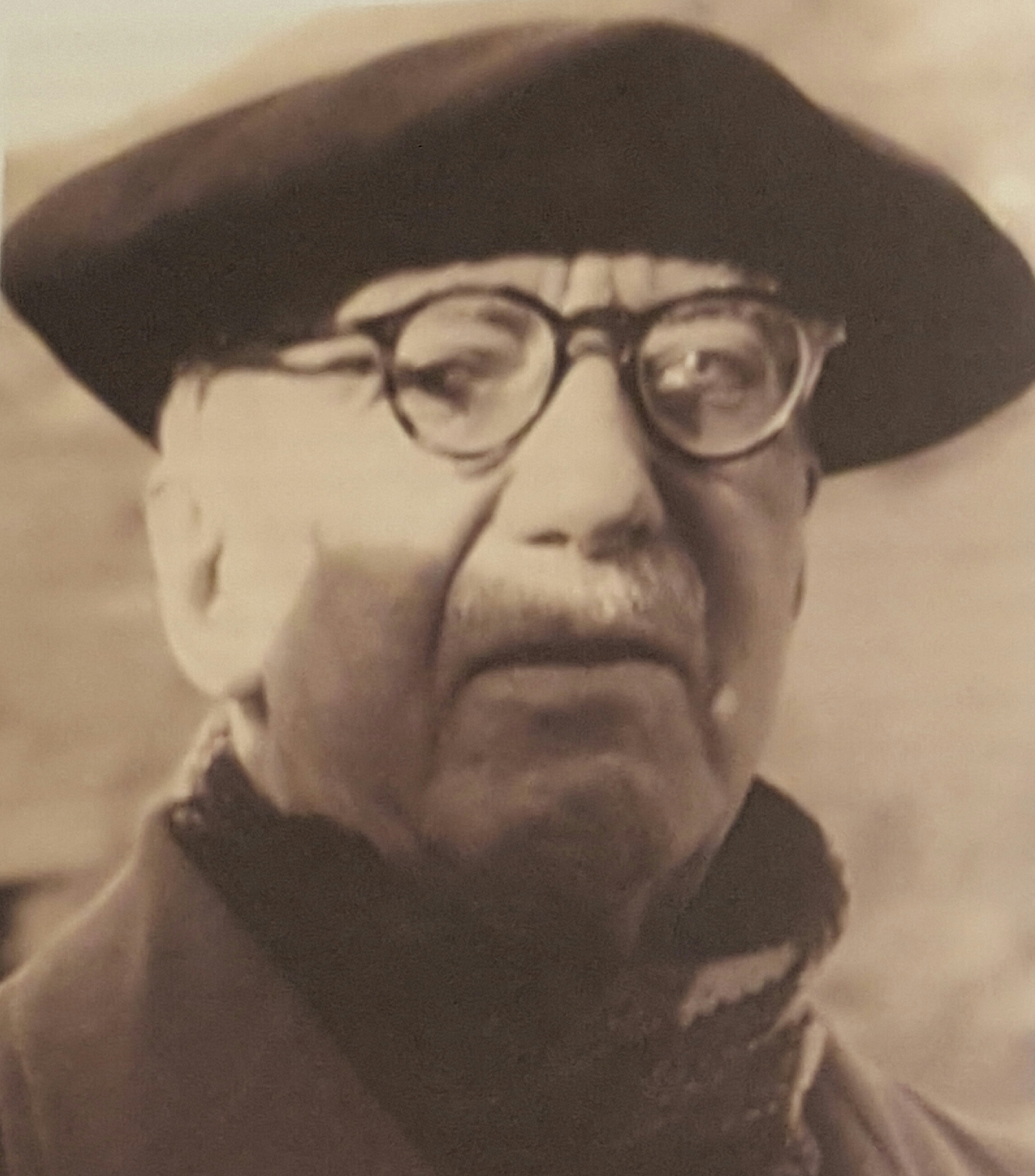
Antonin Gadal

Antonin Gadal (March 15, 1877 – June 15, 1962) was a French mystic and historian who dedicated his life to study of the Cathars in the south of France, their spirituality, beliefs and ideology.

== Life ==
Gadal was born in 1877 in the Pyrenean town of Tarascon in the Ariège region in the south of France, which was one of the centres of the heretical gnostic Christian movement known as the Cathars or the Albigensians in the 12th and 13th centuries. Another major Cathar centre, Montségur, the castle where their leaders made their last stand against the Crusaders, is not far away to the north-east. Montaillou, the village which continued as a secret community of Cathars until the 14th century and the Inquisition's records of which went up to make Emmanuel Le Roy Ladurie's book Montaillou: Promised Land of Error (1975), is also nearby.

Gadal grew up in a house next to the Tarasconian historian Adolphe Garrigou who specialised in the history of the Cathars (along with his son he is honoured by a plaque on the building he lived in on one of the squares in Tarascon). Garrigou saw himself as a preserver of the memory of the Christian sect and, seeing a kindred spirit in the young man took him under his wing as an inheritor of his knowledge. As an adult, Gadal worked as a schoolteacher but his fascination with the Cathars lead him to work for the Tourist Board Of Ussat Ornolac. In doing so he was able to explore the Pyrenean caves himself, which he believed were hiding places and sites of worship for the Cathars. Through his investigations he developed a detailed picture of what he believed were the inner mysteries of their faith. Otto Rahn, the Nazi historian and occultist, is believed to have approached him in his own quest for the secrets of the Cathars (Rahn believed that the Cathars were the trustees of the Holy Grail). Although some have suggested that Gadal refused to assist Rahn, it seems likely that in fact Gadal personally took Rahn on a tour of the various Cathar Cave locations.

Gadal also worked with an English student of the Cathars, Walter Birks, and their association is described in the book "The Treasure of Montségur" by Birks and his collaborator R. A. Gilbert (1987). It is not always clear whether the assertions in this book are by Birks, or by the younger scholar Gilbert, who held strong views about Gadal's work.

== Gadal and Cathar spirituality ==
Gadal's belief was that the spirituality of the Cathars traced back through various Gnostic beliefs (such as Manicheanism, Christian Gnosticism) to the most ancient sources of the Western Mystery Tradition - the Essenes, Hermeticism, the Egyptian Mysteries and so on - but seen in a Christian context. He argued that in the Ariège basin, and particularly the Lombrives caves, Cathar Perfecti (the spiritual elite of the movement) underwent a three-year period of initiation in which they experienced a transformation of the human soul, much like that experienced by Christ in the Gospels - Transfiguration, Death & Resurrection. Transformed by the Holy Spirit, the Perfecti then went out into the world, having 'died' to it, to spread the Cathar faith and minister to the Credentes, or Believers. Gadal's belief was that this process of Initiation was contained within the Christian message of the Gospels and the cycle of the Christ story and was the hidden meaning of the Grail Legend.

Through his interest in the Gnostic Christianity of the Cathars and his belief in its connection with an ancient tradition, in his later years Gadal made contact with the leaders of the neo-Gnostic, Christian Rosicrucian movement, the Lectorium Rosicrucianum - Jan van Rijckenborgh and Catharose de Petri. Gadal's theories and ideas subsequently became a very important element in the cosmology of the Lectorium and to this day members of the society embark on pilgrimages to the Ariège and the Lombrives caves every five years.

== Later life and work ==
As well as his work in the Ariège region, Gadal travelled widely through Europe and the world lecturing on the Cathars, his findings and theories, many of which were rejected by academics as being too mystical or speculative. His books include The Inheritance of the Cathars and On the Path to the Holy Grail (ISBN 9067322857), both printed by the Rosycross Press, the printing arm of the Lectorium. He died in 1962.

== See also ==
- Ariège
- Catharose de Petri
- Cathars/Catharism, Cathar Perfect, Credentes
- Christian mysticism
- Gnosticism
- Holy Grail
- Jan van Rijckenborgh
- Lectorium Rosicrucianum
- Manicheanism
- Rosicrucianism, Rosicrucian Manifestos
