= Fraternity of the Hidden Light =

Fraternity of the Hidden Light (also known as Fraternitas L.V.X. Occulta) is a magical organization and "Aquarian Age" mystery school in the Western Mystery Tradition that teaches occult sciences.

== History ==
The Fraternity of the Hidden Light traces its lineage to the Hermetic Order of the Golden Dawn. It was founded in the 1982 in Covina, California by Paul A. Clark.

== Influences ==
Paul Foster Case's work is a major influence on the Fraternity of the Hidden Light. The Fraternity has published the original lessons that Case wrote for the School of Ageless Wisdom, the organization that later became Builders of the Adytum. The founding Steward of the Fraternity published a book entitled Paul Foster Case. His Life and Works. Ann Davies, who took over the leadership of BOTA after the death of Case, is also an important influence on the Fraternity. Paul Clark is also an acknowledged authority on the thought of Dion Fortune who also influences the Fraternity.

== Publications ==
The Fraternity of the Hidden Light also publishes occult books. Among the books published:

- Case, Paul F. (2008). Occult Fundamentals and Spiritual Unfoldment. Vol. 1: The Early Writings. [no location given]: Fraternity of the Hidden Light;
- Case, Paul F. (2008). Esoteric Secrets of Meditation and Magic. Vol. 2: The Early Writings. [no location given]: Fraternity of the Hidden Light
- Clark, P. (2013) Paul Foster Case. His Life and Works. Covina CA: Fraternity of the Hidden Light
