= Hermann Fictuld =

Anonymous Freemason and writer (c. 1700–1777)

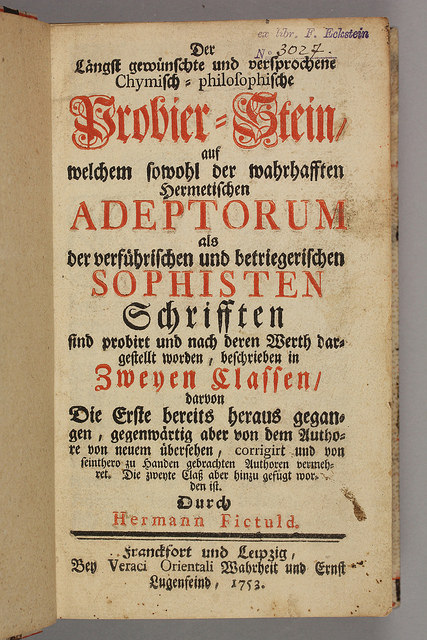
Der Längst gewünschte und versprochene chymisch-philosophische Probier-Stein, 1753

Hermann Fictuld (c. 14 January 1700 – c. 1777) was a pseudonym used by an early Freemason, whose identity has not been definitely determined. He wrote books on alchemy and on Hermeticism.

In addition to other works on alchemy, Fictuld published Der Längst gewünschte und versprochene chymisch-philosophische Probier-Stein, auf welchem sowohl der wahrhafften hermetischen Adeptorum als der verführischen und betriegerischen Sophisten Schrifften sind probirt und nach deren Werth dargestellt worden, beschrieben in zweyen Classen (1753), an annotated bibliography of alchemical writings. In the second edition Fictuld distinguishes between those he considers true adepts and sophists or charlatans. He criticized the works of alchemists such as DJW (Dorothea Juliana Wallich) with "great severity", castigating them as fit only for burning.

Hermann Fictuld was one of the leaders of the Order of the Golden and Rosy Cross, whose origins he traced to the Order of the Golden Fleece. The Golden and Rosy Cross was first written about by Samuel Richter ('Sincerus Rinatus') in Breslau in 1710. Fictuld led an extensive reform in the organization in the 1760s and 1770s. Fictuld's Aureum Vellus oder Goldenes Vliess (1749) may have offered a common foundation which appealed to a variety of existing Hermetic groups. Fictuld corresponded with theosopher Friedrich Christoph Oetinger. In his recreation of the Order, Fictuld sought a return to "old ways and ceremonies" representing the "veneration of God and the welfare of humankind." The Aureum Vellus was widely read and may have led to the Order's integration into the Society of Freemasons.

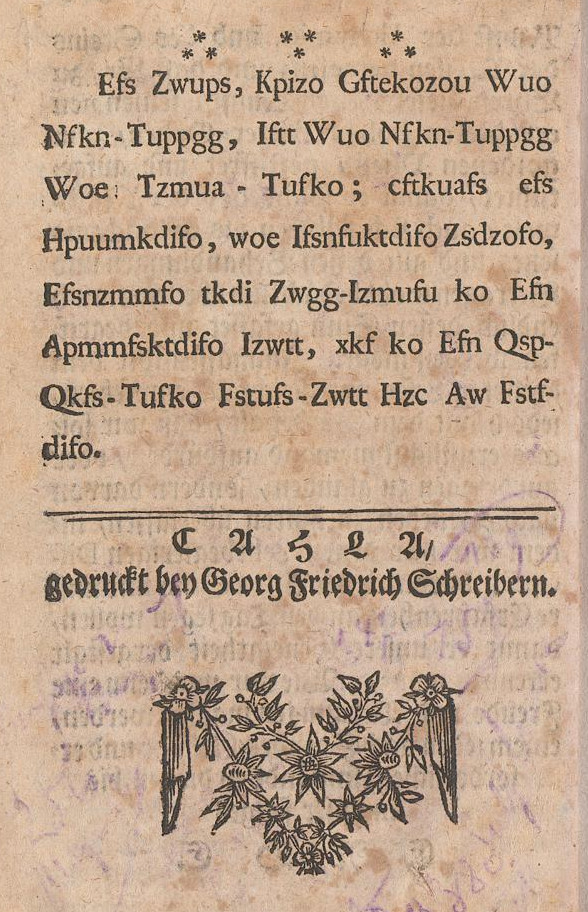
Substitution cipher, from page 380 of Azoth et Ignis by Hermann Fictuld

Some believe that Hermann Fictuld's real identity was Baron Johann Friedrich von Meinstorff, based on a substitution cipher at the end of one of his books, p. 380 of Azoth et Ignis, Das ist, das wahre Elementarische Wasser und Feuer Oder Mercurius Philosophorum, Als das einige nothwendige der Fundamental-Uranfänge und Principiorum des Steins der Weisen, 1749. Other sources suggest that his real name may have been Johann Heinrich Schmidt von Sonnenberg (1700-1777).
