= Lectorium Rosicrucianum =

Christian school

Symbol of the Lectorium Rosicrucianum

The Lectorium Rosicrucianum or International School of the Golden Rosycross is a Spiritual School which considers itself a worldwide school of Esoteric Christianity. It was founded in 1935 by Dutch mystics Jan van Rijckenborgh, his brother Zwier Willem Leene and Catharose de Petri. The school teaches a form of modern Christian Gnosticism which is based upon the ideas and iconography of Rosicrucianism, the beliefs of the Cathars and other forms of religio-mystical thought such as Hermeticism and alchemy.

Although it was suppressed by the Nazis during World War 2, the Lectorium Rosicrucianum now counts about 15,000 members and has branches in countries all over the world in all continents except Asia and Antarctica.

== History ==
In 1924, the brothers Jan and Wim Leene became members of the American movement Rosicrucian Fellowship, founded in 1909 by Max Heindel. In 1929, they directed the head of the branch in the Netherlands. Joined by Henriette Stok-Huizer in 1930, they founded together an independent group in 1935 under the name of 'Rozekruisers Genootschap' (Rosicrucian Society); however, they fixed the official date of founding of the LR on 24 August 1924, in Haarlem. After the death of Wim Leene in 1938, Jan Leene and Henny Stok-Huyser wrote the doctrine of the group, using pen-names: respectively Jan van Rijckenborgh and Catharose de Petri. Rijckenborgh published a book that is based on the seven letters mentioned in the Bible's Book of Revelation and entitled Dei Gloria Intacta.

During World War II, the group was persecuted by the Nazis. In 1945, they created the School of the Rose-Croix d'Or (Lectorium Rosicrucianum). In 1954, the two founders met in France Antonin Gadal, an important figure in the Cathar revival. In 1957, he created an archeological museum in Ussat-les-Bains, where the Lectorium Rosicrucianum used a field in Ussat-les-Bains to organize conferences.

Jan Leene died in July 1968, and Henriette Stok-Huyzer directed the movement, after an important internal dissent which caused the departure of the son of the founder of the group, Henk Leene with many students, which led to the creation of the Sivas Esoteric Community. After Stok-Huyzer's death in 1990, the direction of movement was entrusted to a collegiate of pupils, the "International Spiritual Directorate" (ISD).

== Type ==
The LR has been described as a "christo-centric mystery school" which claims to be inspired by the "ancient Christian mysteries" (the Cathars, the Grail, Rosicrucianism), and is said to be the guardian of these teachings. Massimo Introvigne has defined the LR as a "dualistic and gnostic Christianity" which is not part of the New Age, but was able to find members in this movement. In its statutes, the French branch stated that its goal is "the spread of the mysteries of the rosy cross, gnosis, and the holy grail", and rejected "the magic, mediumship, and all occult or astrological practice".

== Teachings ==
The teachings of the organization are based on the New Testament, Catharism, the Corpus Hermeticum, the dualistic Gnosticism of the first centuries and the German literature of the first Rosicrucian trend, including Paracelsus.

=== The two nature orders ===
The LR has a "particular version of Christian Gnosticism", which includes the fundamental teaching of the concept of the 'two nature orders': First, there is the material nature order, which includes the dead as well as the living, and everything in this nature order is subject to the cycle of being born, living, dying, and being born again. Secondly, there is the original, divine, spiritual nature order. The first domain of existence is the world of perishability, of rising, shining, and fading, or 'dialectics'; the second is the world of imperishability, or 'statics', which in the Bible is called 'the kingdom of heaven'. A last remnant of the second nature order, called a 'divine spark' or 'rose of the heart', is latent in the heart.

=== Awakening of the Inner Christ ===
One of the aims of the Lectorium Rosicrucianum is to inform people about the source of this sense of yearning, and to explain the need for a return to the divine nature order by the process of 'rebirth from the spirit' (John 3:8), which was taught, for instance, by Jesus to Nicodemus. It is stated that this process of rebirth, or 'transfiguration', is made possible through our 'daily dying', as Paul calls it (1 Cor. 15:31). What dies is the old nature, the I-consciousness, and what must awaken is the divine nature, the inner Christ. The Lectorium Rosicrucianum proposes a teaching of this process, as well as support for its members in their efforts to realize it in their lives.

According to authors Fahlbusch and Bromiley, Rijckenborgh taught that Christ never came on Earth and his sacrificial death is a mistaken teaching; they think that this can lead LR members to leave the Church. However, the actual writings of Rijckenborgh contradict this assertion by the authors. According to Rijckenborgh, Jesus was a disciple of and proceeded from the Order of the Essenes.

=== Transfigurism ===
The transfiguristic precepts taught by the Lectorium Rosicrucianum are said to be embedded in the teachings of all great religions. For instance, in the Bible, the concepts of the two nature orders, the divine principle in the human heart, and the path of transfiguration, can be traced in the following quotations: 'My Kingdom is not of this world' (John 18:36), 'the Kingdom of God is within you' (Luke 17:21) and 'He must increase, I must decrease' (John 3:30).

=== The Human Being as Microcosm ===
Another fundamental Rosicrucian concept is the idea of the human being as a microcosm or world in miniature – a system of visible and invisible vehicles surrounded by a magnetic field and bounded by a 'microcosmic firmament', or 'lipika.' This idea is in accordance with the hermetic axiom, 'as above, so below.'

=== The Stages of Transfigurism ===
The path of transfiguration comprises five main stages:

- Insight into the real nature of this earthly domain of existence and experience of the inner call to return to the divine nature order.
- Genuine yearning for salvation.
- The surrender of the I-central self to the inner divine spark, so that the process of salvation can be realized.
- A new approach to life, adopted and carried out spontaneously under the guidance of the inner divine spark. The chief characteristics of this new approach to life are described, for instance, in the Sermon on the Mount.
- Fulfilment: the awakening (or resurrection) in the original life-field.

== Organization ==
The Lectorium Rosicrucianum has its own publishing section in the Netherlands, named Rozekruis Pers, which issues a large range of publications, including books by the founders which are also translated, books by authors dealing with Rosicrucian subjects, and a virtual magazine called Logon. The movement claims not to be a religion but a Spiritual School, although it has achieved this recognition as one in the Netherlands, Spain and Hungary.

== Spread ==
Worldwide, the Lectorium Rosicrucianum has about 15,000 pupils and persons who await admission as pupils. Nearly 8,000 of them are in European countries.

In its first time, the movement enjoyed success in Germany. It began to be active in this country in 1949, initially under the name "Neue Internationale Transfiguristische Schule". In May 1955, it was registered as nonprofit association as the "Internationale Schule des Rosenkreuzes" then in 1998, as "Internationale Schule des Goldenen Rosenkreuzes, Lectorium Rosicrucianum e.V". The association has in Germany a total of three conference centers and, in 2005, the number of active members is about 2,500.

The Lectorium Rosicrucianum became active in Switzerland (Zurich) in 1954, in Benin in 1989.

The first center in Australia was established in Adelaide in 1974, and in 1999 they were two centers in the country (near Melbourne and in the Sydney metropolitan area).

== Conditions to be Pupil ==
According to the Lectorium transfiguristic teachings are not meant to be considered only in a philosophical way – they are meant to be 'lived'. This 'living' of the teachings is the central aim of pupilship of the Spiritual School. For those who do not feel ready to practice pupilship in this sense, but who still want to maintain a connection with the School, membership is possible.

Personal Freedom

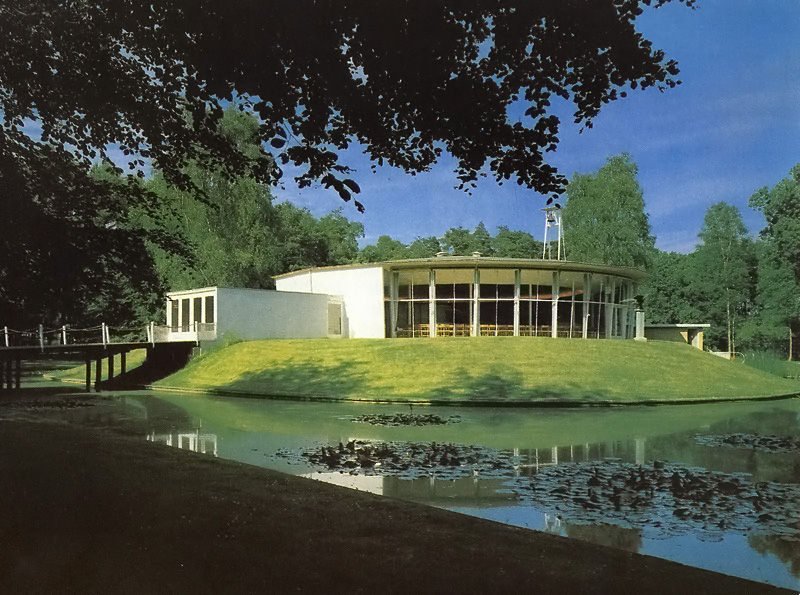
Renova Temple, Bilthoven, Netherlands

Before deciding to join, interested people are able to find out more about the organization without any obligation. After joining, individuals are free to break their connection with the Lectorium at any time should they wish to do so. Personal freedom, according to the organization, is seen as the only right basis for following the spiritual path.

Temples and Conference Centers

In many countries the Lectorium Rosicrucianum has temples and conference centers, where the pupils meet regularly for temple services and other meetings during which they study the transfiguristic philosophy and reflect on how they can integrate it into their lives. Also about 160 centers exist in cities around the world.

Morality

Pupils are expected to adopt certain basic life reforms, such as vegetarianism and the abstention from tobacco, alcohol and drugs. A high standard of morality is also expected. In external activities as well as in their inner development, men and women play an equal part. Pupils are of all ages.

== Status in France ==
In France, the group was classified as a cult in the 1995 and 1999 parliamentary reports. On 27 May 2005, the 1995 annex of the French report and cult classifications in which LR was listed, were officially cancelled and invalidated by Jean-Pierre Raffarin's circulaire. According to French anti-cult association UNADFI, Lectorium Rosicrucianum "can put people in a state of weakness" by "marginaliz[ing] the applicant from the beginning and in the minute details" (vegetarian food, avoidance of television, prohibition of alcohol ...). Because of the inclusion of the group on the list of cults of the parliamentary report, the mayor of Poitiers did not allow the LR to participate in a public event called "Day of Associations", on 24 July 1996. Defended by lawyer Olivier-Louis Séguy, LR sued the city of Poitiers and won. After the publication of the 1995 report, the president of LR claimed to have received death threats.

About LR, delegate of the French episcopate for the study of cults and new religious movements Jean Vernette said: "The commission did not have reliable information. (...) With the mention of the Rose-Croix d'Or in the parliamentary reports, we have a fairly typical example of the error of route." When hearing by the Belgian commission on cults, philosopher Luc Nefontaine said that "the establishment of a directory of cult movements (...) seems to him dangerous, because it would also give a bad image of quite honourable organizations as School of the Rose-Croix d'Or". After analyzing the movement, French historian Antoine Faivre said that "it has all the characteristics of an initiatory order which fits into the history of current modern esoteric movements. (...) It seems to me that it does not meet any of the criteria used in the report of the [French] commission to define a cult. (...) This school, in every way honourable, does not present any dangerous aspects and even exerts (...) an interesting and positive action".

In 2012, the LR was registered as a religious association in France, and the main anti-cult organization MIVILUDES and UNADFI said they did not consider it a cult.

== See also ==
- Antonin Gadal
- Catharose de Petri
- Cathars/Catharism
- Esoteric Christianity
- Gnosticism
- Jan van Rijckenborgh
- Rosicrucianism, Rosicrucian Manifestos

== Notes ==
- Faivre, Antoine (1996). "Les courants ésotériques et le rapport. Les exemples de Nouvelle Acropole et de la Rose-Croix d'Or (Lectorium Rosicrucianum)" (PDF). Pour en finir avec les sectes – Le débat sur la commission parlementaire (in French). CESNUR, Di Giovanni. pp. 246–52. ISBN 88-85237-11-8. Archived from the original (PDF) on 11 March 2012.
