= Parabola Allegory =

17th century Rosicrucian allegory

The Parabola Allegory is a Rosicrucian allegory, of unknown authorship, dating from the latter part of the seventeenth century. It is sometimes attributed to German alchemist Henricus Madathanus.

Bearing many similarities to The Chymical Wedding of Christian Rosenkreutz, it is steeped in alchemical imagery. It deals with the journey of initiation of an unknown narrator, who, after many trials, enters the Rose Garden and bears witness to the dissolution and reconstitution of a pair of royal lovers into a King and Queen.

Like The Chymical Wedding, the Parabola Allegory has the haunting quality of a dream. It was taken as the starting point by Viennese psychologist Herbert Silberer for an analysis of Freudian dream interpretation, in his major work Problems of Mysticism and Its Symbolism, where the Allegory is quoted in full. Silberer interprets the Allegory along Freudian lines then, pointing out the limitations of such an approach, goes on to interpret the narrative along alchemical/mystical lines, placing the story in the context of the Mystery traditions of the world's religions as an allegory of the Unio Mystica.

== See also ==
- Alchemy
- Rosicrucianism
- Rosicrucian Manifestos; Fama Fraternitatis; Confessio Fraternitatis
- Mysticism
- Allegory
- Carl Jung
- Sigmund Freud
