= Order of the Golden and Rosy Cross =

German Rosicrucian Organization

The Order of the Golden and Rosy Cross (Orden des Gold- und Rosenkreutz, also the Fraternity of the Golden and Rosy Cross), was a German Rosicrucian organization founded in the 1750s by Freemason and alchemist Hermann Fictuld. Candidates were expected to be Master Masons in good standing. Alchemy was to be a central study for members. Much of the hierarchical structure for this order was used in Societas Rosicruciana in Anglia (SRIA) and from there, the Hermetic Order of the Golden Dawn.

== History ==
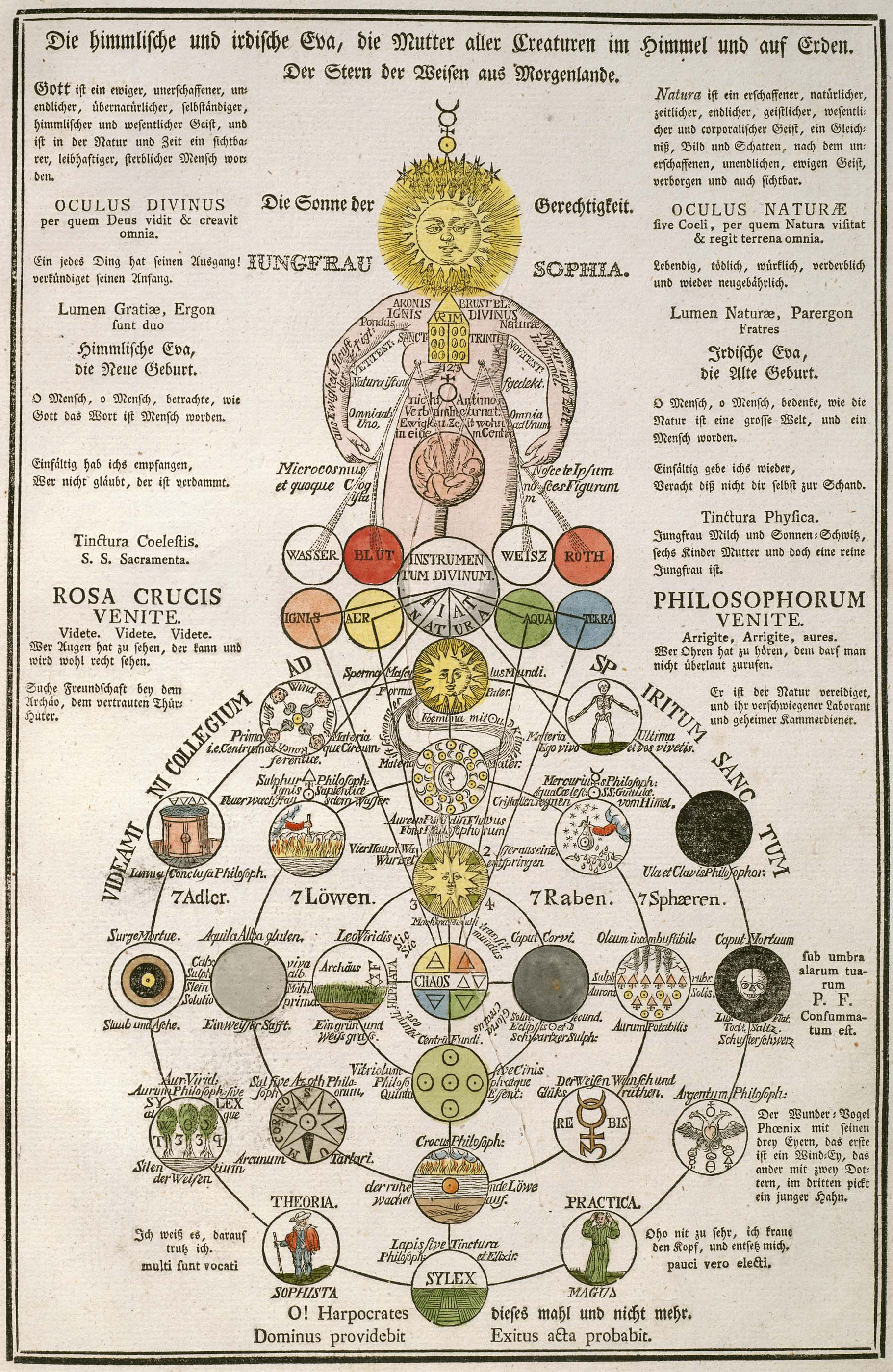
Sophia, Secret figures of the Rosicrucians of sixteenth and seventeenth centuries, 1775

The fraternity was founded in the 1750s, but it is not certain when it came into existence. Many documents and books mention it from the eighteenth century. For instance, Frater U∴D∴ believes that in 1710, the idea for the order was born with the publication of Sigmund Richter's (using the name Sincerus Renatus) The perfect and true preparation of the Philosophers Stone according to the secret of the Brotherhoods of the Golden and Rosy Cross. By the 1770s, the order had centers in Berlin, Hamburg, Frankfurt am Main, Regensburg, Munich, Vienna, Prague, Poland, Hungary, and Russia.

The order slowly began to decline after the death of King Frederick William II.

== Structure and governance ==
The order is subdivided into:

- Grade I – Juniorus
- Grade II – Theoricus
- Grade III – Practicus
- Grade IV – Philosophus
- Grade V – Adeptus Minor
- Grade VI – Adeptus Major
- Grade VII – Adeptus Exemptus
- Grade VIII – Magister
- Grade IX – Magus

== Known members ==
- King Friedrich Wilhelm
- Georg Forster
- Johann Christoph von Wöllner
- Nikolay Novikov
- J.C.A. Theden
- Ivan Lopukhin
- Ivan Dmitrevsky
- Ion Budai-Deleanu
- Hans Rudolf von Bischoffwerder

== See also ==
- Magical organization
- Rosicrucianism
- Societas Rosicruciana

== Bibliography ==
- Raffaella Faggionato: "Rosicrucian Utopia in Eighteenth-Century Russia, A: The Masonic Circle of N.I. Novikov". ISBN 978-1-4020-3486-2
- Antoine Faivre: "Access to Western esotericism", State University of New York Press, 1994, ISBN 0791421783, ISBN 978-0791421789
- Christopher McIntosh: "The Rosicrucians: the history, mythology, and rituals of an esoteric order", Weiser Books 1988, ISBN 0877289204
- McIntosh, Christopher (1992) The Rose Cross and the Age of Reason: Eighteenth-century Rosicrucianism in Central Europe and its relationship to the Enlightenment, E.J. Brill, New York, ISBN 90-04-09502-0
- Claude-Antoine Thory: Acta Latomorum, ou chronoligie de l'histoire de la franche-maçonnerie Française et étrangère avec un supplément, Durfart, Paris, 2 bind, 1815
- Renko D. Geffarth (2007) "Religion Und Arkane Hierarchie: Der Orden Der Gold- Und Rosenkreuzer Als Geheime Kirche Im 18. Jahrhundert", ISBN 978-9004156678 ISBN 9004156674
- Harald Lamprecht: Neue Rosenkreuzer. Ein Handbuch. Vandenhoeck & Ruprecht
- Karl R.H. Frick: "Die Erleuchteten: Gnostisch-theosophische und alchemistisch-rosenkreuzerische Geheimgesellschaften bis zum Ende des 18. Jahrhunderts, ein Beitrag zur Geistesgeschichte der Neuzeit", Akademische Druck- und Verlagsanstalt, Graz, 1973, ISBN 3201008346, ISBN 978-3201008341; andre utgave Marix Verlag, 31. januar 2005, ISBN 3865390064, ISBN 978-3865390066
