= Esoteric Christianity =

Mystical approach to Christianity

Esoteric Christianity is a mystical approach to Christianity which features "secret traditions" that require an initiation to learn or understand. The term esoteric was coined in the 17th century and derives from the Greek ἐσωτερικός (esōterikos, "inner"). It stands in contrast to exoteric (ἐξωτερικός, exōterikos, "outer" or "public"), a distinction already noted by Aristotle, who referred to ἐξωτερικοὶ λόγοι ("exoteric discourses") intended for a general audience. Esoteric teachings were often transmitted orally to a small inner circle of initiates rather than through written publications, a pattern consistent with other religious "secret traditions".

Scholars note that esoteric Christian movements often emphasize alternative interpretations of Christian theology that differ from established orthodoxy. These currents frequently draw upon the canonical gospels, apocalyptic writings, and certain New Testament apocrypha as sources of hidden or symbolic meaning. Some traditions also refer to the disciplina arcani, a concept describing secret teachings or liturgical practices transmitted in the early Church, although mainstream scholarship generally understands it as limited to liturgical secrecy rather than esoteric doctrine.

Scholars debate the relationship between esoteric Christianity and Gnosticism. While some see Gnostic movements as among the earliest expressions of esoteric Christian thought, others argue that esoteric Christianity developed distinctively through Alexandrian theology, medieval mysticism, and later currents such as Rosicrucianism and Theosophy.

There are also esoteric Christian Societies such as the Societas Rosicruciana in Anglia.

== History ==
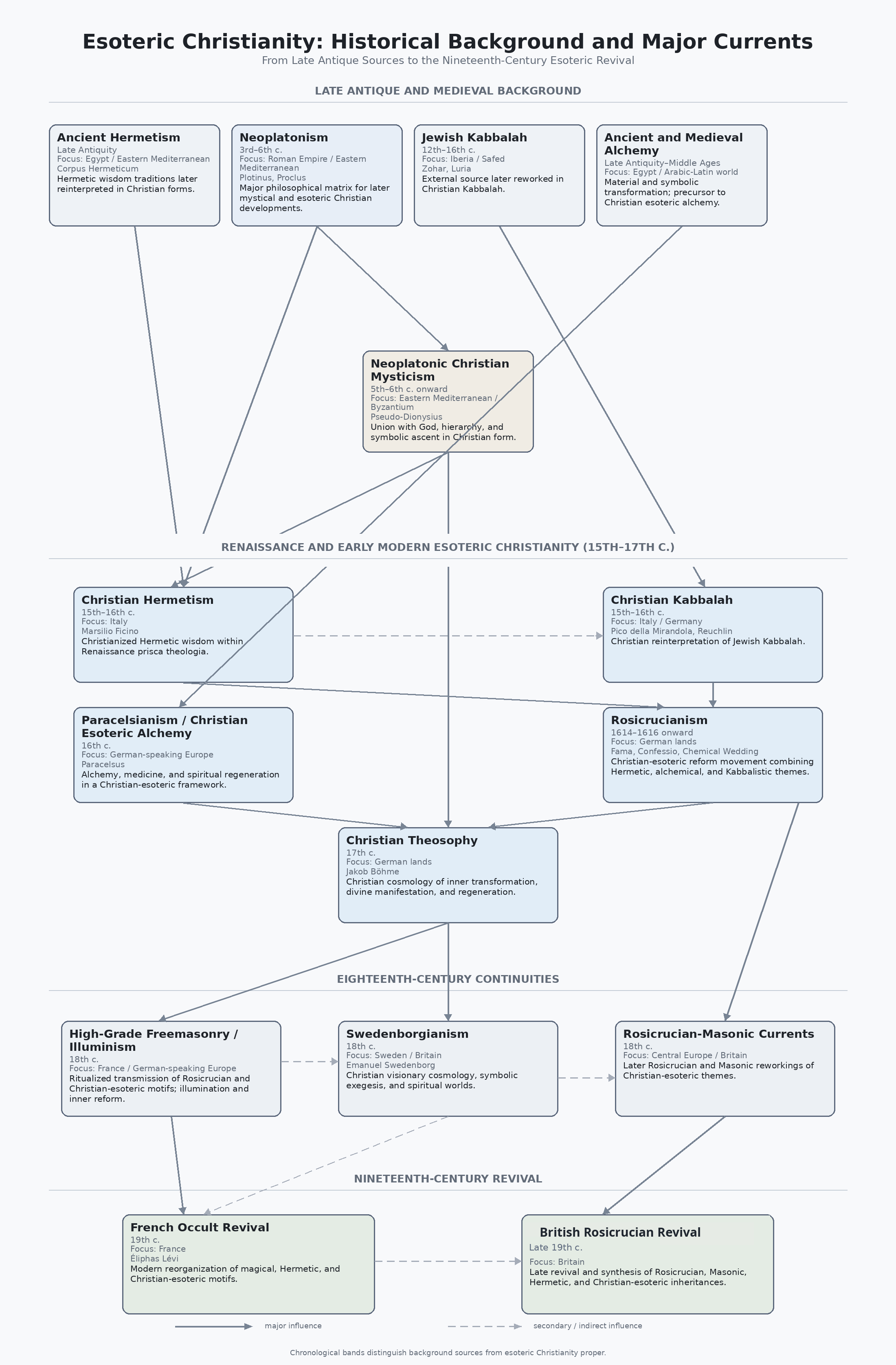
Synoptic chart of the historical background and major currents of esoteric Christianity. Esoteric Christianity properly emerged during the Renaissance; the theory of prisca theologia, present in sectors of the humanist movement, favored the Christian reinterpretation of platonism, hermeticism, alchemy, and kabbalah. However, the esoteric Christianity that reached the contemporary era was mediated by the Romantic movement of the late 18th century and 19th century; Romantic sensibility revalued the imagination, the forces of nature, and the symbolic world—in a context of declining esotericism in the face of Enlightenment trends and scientific revolutions—thus fostering the cultural climate of the subsequent 19th century occult revival.

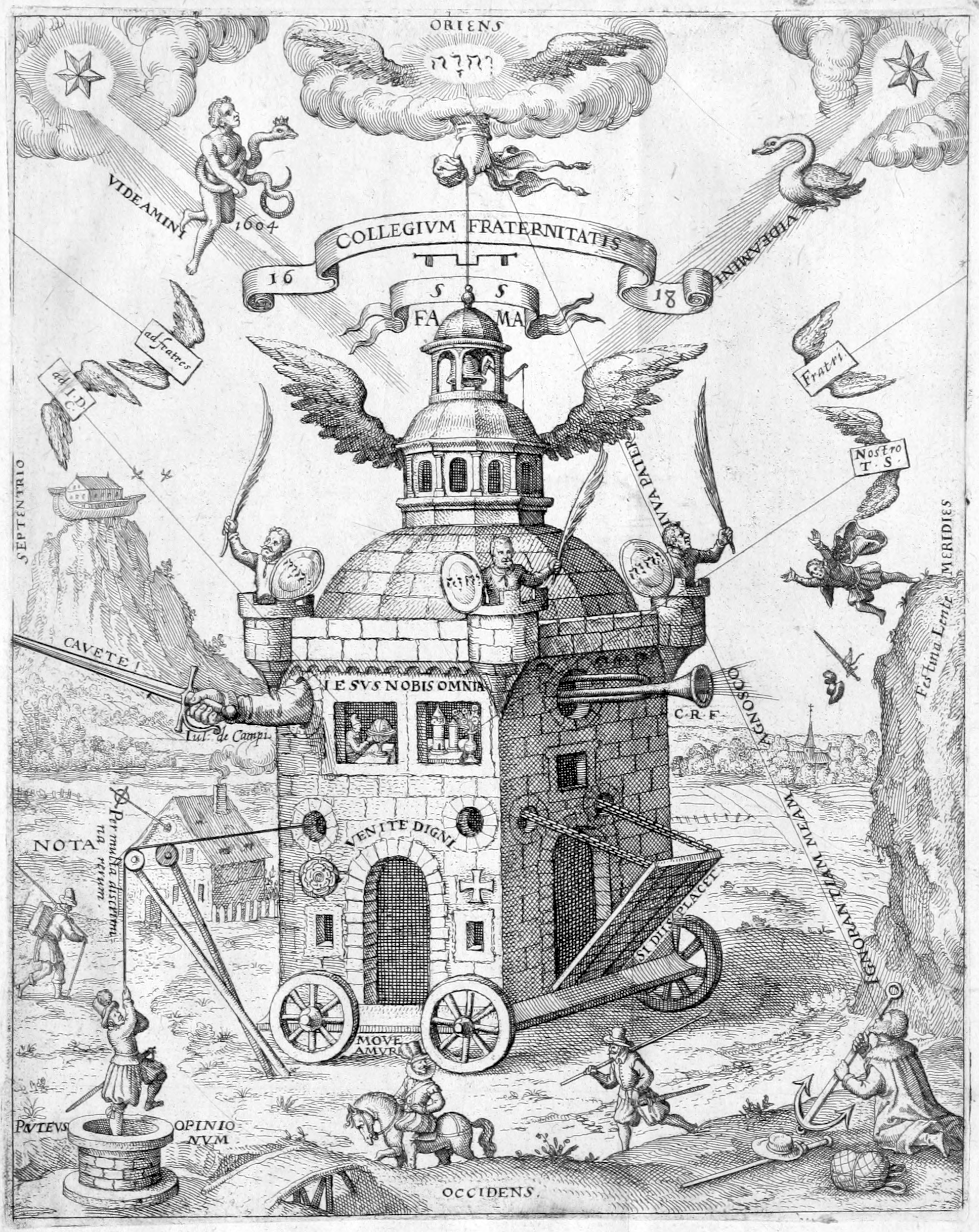
The Temple of the Rose Cross, Teophilus Schweighardt Constantiens, 1618

=== Ancient roots ===
Some modern scholars believe that in the early stages of proto-orthodox Christianity, a nucleus of oral teachings were inherited from Palestinian and Hellenistic Judaism. In the 4th century, it was believed to form the basis of a secret oral tradition which came to be called disciplina arcani. Mainstream theologians, however, believe that it contained only liturgical details and certain other traditions which remain a part of some branches of mainstream Christianity. Important influences on esoteric Christianity are the Christian theologians Clement of Alexandria and Origen, the leading figures of the Catechetical School of Alexandria.

=== Present-day denominations ===
A denomination of esoteric Christianity is The Christian Community. It focuses on the experiential aspect of sacraments, with the Eucharist serving as "the Rite of the Consecration of Man".

Scholar Jan Shipps describes the Church of Jesus Christ of Latter-day Saints as having esoteric elements.

== Concepts ==
=== Reincarnation ===
Influenced by the Platonic doctrine of metempsychosis, reincarnation of the soul was accepted by most Gnostic Christian sects such as Valentinianism and the Basilidians, but denied by the proto-orthodox one. While hypothetically considering a complex multiple-world transmigration scheme in De Principiis, Origen denies reincarnation in his work Against Celsus and elsewhere.

Despite this apparent contradiction, most modern esoteric Christian movements refer to Origen's writings (along with other Church Fathers and biblical passages) to validate these ideas as part of the esoteric Christian tradition outside of the Gnostic schools, who were later considered heretical in the 3rd century.

== See also ==
- Anthroposophy
- The Aquarian Gospel of Jesus the Christ
- Heinrich Cornelius Agrippa
- Jakob Böhme
- Vade Retro Satana
- Sigillum Dei
- Chi Rho
- Christian Kabbalah
- Christian meditation
- Christian mythology
- Christian perfection
- Christian theosophy
- Enochian magick
- George Gurdjieff
- Martinism
- Mystical theology
- Johann Reuchlin
- Rosicrucianism
- Rudolf Steiner
