= God in Hinduism =

Hindu conception of God

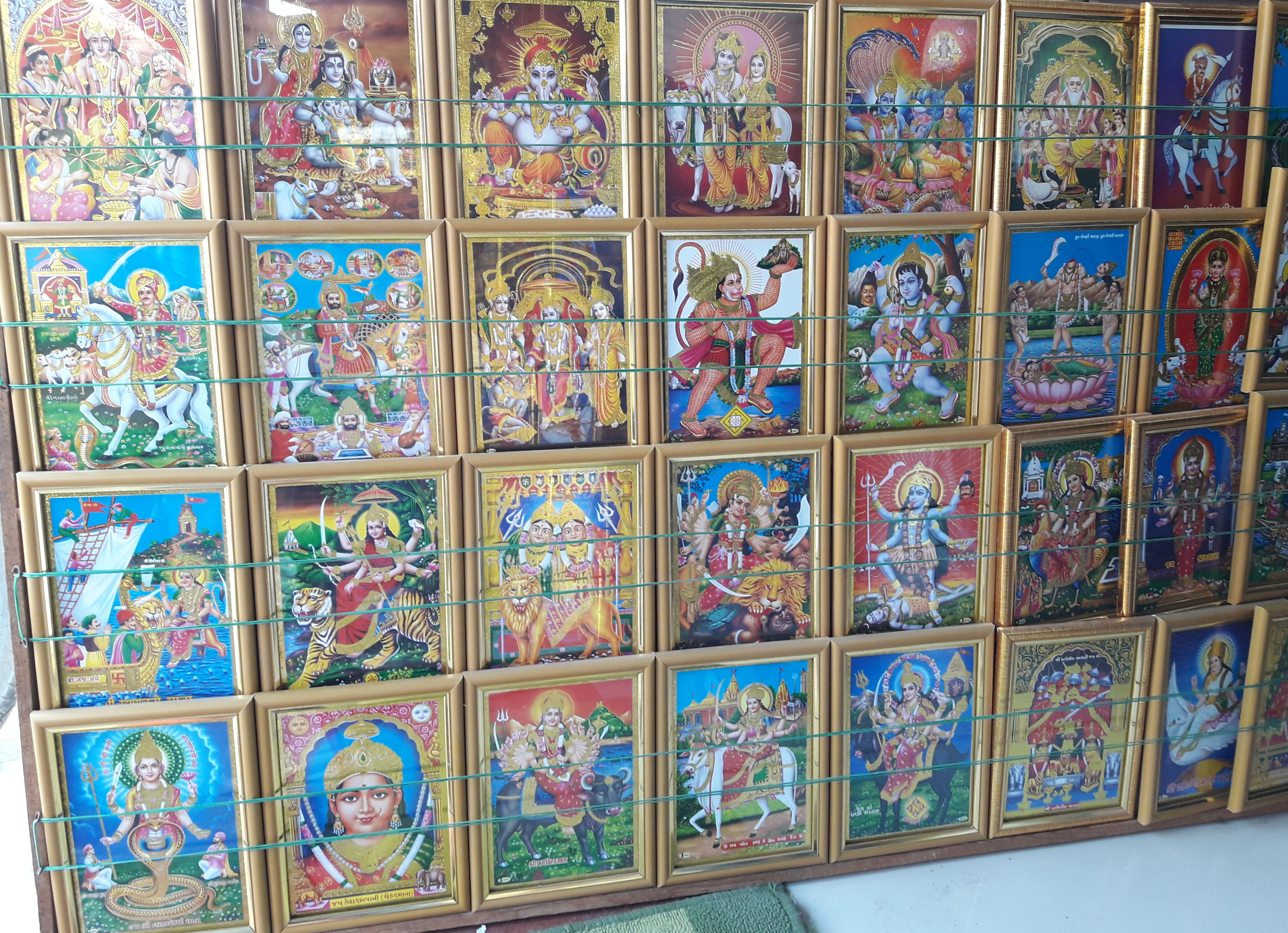
Framed images of various Hindu deities. In dualistic Hindu thought, the Hindu deities are viewed and worshipped as aspects of, or incarnations, of the same-single ultimate reality called Brahman. (Note: [a] Hark, Lisa; DeLisser, Horace (2011). Achieving Cultural Competency. John Wiley & Sons. "Three gods, Brahma, Vishnu, and Shiva, and other deities are considered manifestations of and are worshipped as incarnations of Brahman." [b] Toropov & Buckles 2011: The members of various Hindu sects worship a dizzying number of specific deities and follow innumerable rites in honor of specific gods. Because this is Hinduism, however, its practitioners see the profusion of forms and practices as expressions of the same unchanging reality. The panoply of deities are understood by believers as symbols for a single transcendent reality. [c] Orlando O. Espín, James B. Nickoloff (2007). An Introductory Dictionary of Theology and Religious Studies. Liturgical Press. "While Hindus believe in many devas, many are monotheistic to the extent that they will recognise only one Supreme Being, a God or Goddess who is the source and ruler of the devas.")

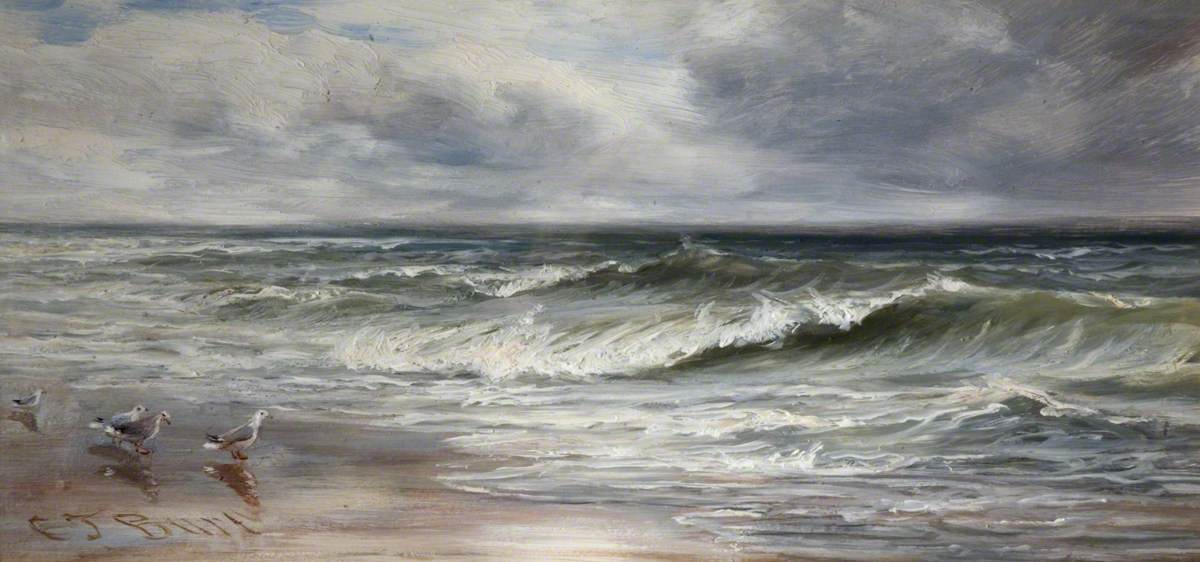
In nondualistic Hindu thought, the self in each being (Atman) is considered identical with Brahman, expressed in the analogy of essential unity between a wave (individual self) and the ocean (God/higher self).

In Hinduism, the conception of God varies in its diverse religio-philosophical traditions. Hinduism comprises a wide range of beliefs about God and divinity, such as henotheism, monotheism, polytheism, panentheism, pantheism, pandeism, monism, agnosticism, atheism, and nontheism.

Forms of theism find mention in the Bhagavad Gita. Emotional or loving devotion (bhakti) to a primary god such as avatars of Vishnu (Krishna for example), Shiva, and Devi (as emerged in the early medieval period) is now known as the Bhakti movement. Contemporary Hinduism can be categorized into four major theistic Hindu traditions: Vaishnavism, Shaivism, Shaktism, and Smartism. Vaishnavism, Shaivism, and Shaktism worship the Hindu deities Vishnu, Shiva, and Devi as the Supreme God respectively, or consider all Hindu deities as aspects of the same, Supreme Reality or the eternal and formless metaphysical Absolute, called Brahman in Hinduism, or, translated from Sanskrit terminology, Svayaṁ-Bhagavān ("God Itself"). Other minor sects such as Ganapatya and Saura focus on the deities Ganesha or Surya as the Supreme.

Hindus following Advaita Vedānta consider ātman, the individual soul within every living being, to be the same as Vishnu, Shiva, or Devi, or, alternatively, identical to the eternal and formless metaphysical Absolute called Brahman. Such a philosophical system of Advaita or non-dualism as it developed in the Vedānta school of Hindu philosophy, especially as set out in the Upanishads, was popularized by the Indian philosopher, Vedic scholar, teacher, and mystic Ādi Śaṅkara in the 8th century CE, and has been vastly influential on Hinduism. Therefore, Advaitins believe that Brahman is the sole Supreme Being (Para Brahman) and Ultimate Reality that exists beyond the (mis)perceived reality of a world of multiple objects and transitory persons.

Hindus following Dvaita Vedānta consider that the jīvātman (individual self) and the eternal and formless metaphysical Absolute called Brahman in Hinduism exist as independent realities, and that these are fundamentally distinct. Such a philosophical system of Dvaita or dualism as it developed in the Vedānta school of Hindu philosophy, especially as set out in the Vedas, was popularized by the Indian philosopher, Vedic scholar, and theologian Madhvācārya in the 13th century CE, and has been another major influence on Hinduism. In particular, the influence of Madhvācārya's philosophy has been most prominent and pronounced on the Chaitanya school of Bengali Vaishnavism.

== Henotheism, kathenotheism, and equitheism ==
To what is One

They call him Indra, Mitra, Varuna, Agni,
and he is heavenly-winged Garutman.
To what is One, sages give many a title.

— Rigveda 1.164.46
Transl: Klaus Klostermaier

Henotheism was the term used by scholars such as Max Müller to describe the theology of Vedic religion. Müller noted that the hymns of the Rigveda, the oldest scripture of Hinduism, mention many deities, but praise them successively as the "one ultimate, supreme God" (called saccidānanda in some traditions), alternatively as "one supreme Goddess", thereby asserting that the essence of the deities was unitary (ekam), and the deities were nothing but pluralistic manifestations of the same concept of the divine (God).

The idea that there can be and are plural perspectives for the same divine or spiritual principle repeats in the Vedic texts. For example, other than hymn 1.164 with this teaching, the more ancient hymn 5.3 of the Rigveda states:

You at your birth are Varuna, O Agni.
When you are kindled, you are Mitra.
In you, O son of strength, all gods are centered.
You are Indra to the mortal who brings oblation.
You are Aryaman, when you are regarded as having
the mysterious names of maidens, O Self-sustainer.

— Rigveda 5.3.1-2, Translator: Hermann Oldenberg

Related terms to henotheism are monolatrism and kathenotheism. The latter term is an extension of "henotheism", from καθ' ἕνα θεόν (kath' hena theon) – "one god at a time". Henotheism refers to a pluralistic theology wherein different deities are viewed to be of a unitary, equivalent divine essence. Some scholars prefer the term monolatry to henotheism, to discuss religions where a single god is central, but the existence or the position of other gods is not denied. Another term related to henotheism is "equitheism", referring to the belief that all gods are equal.

Concerning the origin of the universe

Who really knows?
Who will here proclaim it?
Whence was it produced?
Whence is this creation?
The gods came afterwards,
with the creation of this universe.
Who then knows whence it has arisen?

— Nasadiya Sukta, Rig Veda, 10:129-6

== Panentheism and nontheism ==
The Vedic era conceptualization of the divine or the One, states Jeaneane Fowler, is more abstract than a monotheistic God, it is the Reality behind and of the phenomenal universe. The Vedic hymns treat it as "limitless, indescribable, absolute principle", thus the Vedic divine is something of a panentheism rather than simple henotheism.

In the late Vedic era, around the start of the Upanishadic age (c. 800 BCE), theosophical speculations emerged that developed concepts which scholars variously call nondualism or monism, as well as forms of nontheism and pantheism. An example of the questioning of the concept of God, in addition to henotheistic hymns found therein, are in later portions of the Rigveda, such as the Nasadiya Sukta.

Hinduism calls the metaphysical absolute concept Brahman, incorporating within it transcendence and immanence. Different schools of thought interpret Brahman as either personal, impersonal, or transpersonal. Ishwar Chandra Sharma describes it as "Absolute Reality, beyond all dualities of existence and non-existence, light and darkness, and of time, space and cause".

Influential ancient and medieval Hindu philosophers, states philosophy professor Roy Perrett, teach their spiritual ideas with a world created ex nihilo and "effectively manage without God altogether". In Hindu philosophy, there are many different schools. Its non-theist traditions such as Samkhya, early Nyaya, Mimamsa and many within Vedanta such as Advaita do not posit the existence of an almighty, omnipotent, omniscient, omnibenevolent God (monotheistic God), while its theistic traditions posit a personal God left to the choice of the Hindu. The major schools of Hindu philosophy explain morality and the nature of existence through the karma and samsara doctrines, as in other Indian religions.

== Monotheism ==
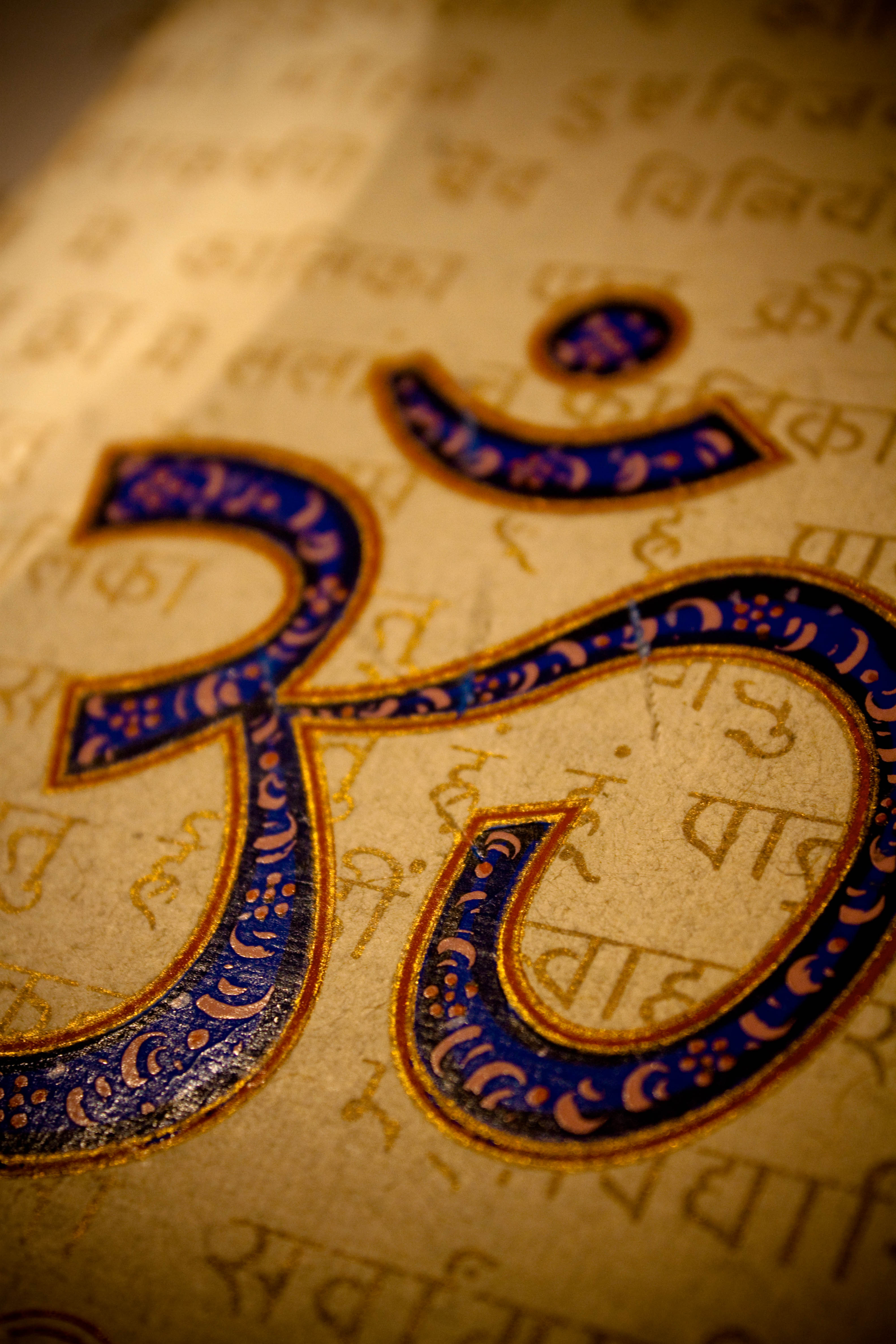
Ōṃ is given many meanings and layers of symbolism in the Upanishads, including "the sacred sound, Om, the Vedas, the udgitha (song of the universe), the infinite, the all encompassing, the whole world, the truth, the Ultimate Reality, the finest essence, the cause of the universe, the essence of life, the Brahman, the ātman, the vehicle of deepest knowledge, and self-knowledge (ātma jñāna)".

Monotheism is the belief in a single creator God and the lack of belief in any other Creator. Different sects of Hinduism may or may not posit or require such a belief, as religion is considered a personal belief in Hinduism and followers are free to choose the different interpretations within the framework of karma and samsara. Many forms of Hinduism believe in a type of monotheistic God, such as Krishnaism with polymorphic theism, some schools of Vedanta, and Arya Samaj.

Advaita Vedanta, for instance, espouses monism, and holds Brahman to be unchanging and undifferentiated from reality. Brahman is therefore undifferentiated from the individual self, or Atman. The concept is thought by some, such as David Adams Leeming and Gavin Flood, to resemble monotheistic conceptions of god to some degree, since all other gods are believed to be manifestations of Brahman.

Several medieval Muslim scholars, such as al-Biruni and Amir Khusrau, described Hinduism as fundamentally monotheistic in nature, and attributed polytheistic worship to a lack of education.

=== Madhvacharya's monotheistic God ===
Madhvacharya (1238–1317 CE) developed the Dvaita theology wherein Vishnu was presented as a monotheistic God, similar to major world religions. His writings led some, such as George Abraham Grierson, to suggest he was influenced by Christianity. However, modern scholarship rules out the influence of Christianity on Madhvacharya, as there is no evidence that there ever was a Christian settlement where Madhvacharya grew up and lived, or that there was a sharing or discussion of ideas between someone with knowledge of the Bible and Christian narratives, and him. Furthermore, many adherents consider the similarities to be superficial and insubstantial; for example, Madhvacharya postulates three co-eternal fundamental realities, consisting of Supreme Being (Vishnu or paramatman), individual Self (jīvātman), and inanimate matter.

Madhvacharya was misperceived and misrepresented by both Christian missionaries and Hindu writers during the colonial era scholarship. The similarities in the primacy of one God, dualism and distinction between man and God, devotion to God, the son of God as the intermediary, predestination, the role of grace in salvation, as well as the similarities in the legends of miracles in Christianity and Madhvacharya's Dvaita tradition fed these stories. Among Christian writers, G. A. Grierson creatively asserted that Madhva's ideas evidently were "borrowed from Christianity, quite possibly promulgated as a rival to the central doctrine of that faith". Among Hindu writers, according to Sarma, S. C. Vasu creatively translated Madhvacharya's works to identify Madhvacharya with Christ, rather than compare their ideas.

=== Statistics in contemporary India ===
In a 2021 nationwide survey Pew Research Center found out that 29% of the self-described Indian Hindus believe "there is only one God" while 61% believed in "there is only one God with many manifestations".

== Brahman ==
Many traditions within Hinduism share the Vedic idea of a metaphysical ultimate reality and truth called Brahman. According to Jan Gonda, Brahman denoted the "power immanent in the sound, words, verses and formulas of Vedas" in the earliest Vedic texts. The early Vedic religious understanding of Brahman underwent a series of abstractions in the Hindu scriptures that followed the Vedic scriptures. These scriptures would reveal a vast body of insights into the nature of Brahman as originally revealed in the Vedas. These Hindu traditions that emerged from or identified with the Vedic scriptures and that maintained the notion of a metaphysical ultimate reality would identify that ultimate reality as Brahman. Hindu adherents to these traditions within Hinduism revere Hindu deities and, indeed, all of existence, as aspects of the Brahman. The deities in Hinduism are not considered to be almighty, omnipotent, omniscient and omnibenevolent, and spirituality is considered to be seeking the ultimate truth that is possible by a number of paths. Like other Indian religions, in Hinduism, deities are born, they live and they die in every kalpa (eon, cycle of existence).

In Hinduism, Brahman connotes the highest Universal Principle, the Ultimate Reality in the universe. In major schools of Hindu philosophy, it is the material, efficient, formal and final cause of all that exists. It is the pervasive, genderless, infinite, eternal truth and bliss which does not change, yet is the cause of all changes. Brahman as a metaphysical concept is the single binding unity behind the diversity in all that exists in the universe.

Brahman is a Vedic Sanskrit word, and it is conceptualized in Hinduism, states Paul Deussen, as the "creative principle which lies realized in the whole world". Brahman is a key concept found in the Vedas, and it is extensively discussed in the early Upanishads. The Vedas conceptualize Brahman as the Cosmic Principle. In the Upanishads, it has been variously described as Sat-cit-ānanda (truth-consciousness-bliss) and as the unchanging, permanent, highest reality. (Note: "not sublatable", the final element in a dialectical process which cannot be eliminated or annihilated (German: "aufheben").) (Note: It is also defined as: The unchanging, infinite, immanent, and transcendent reality which is the Divine Ground of all matter, energy, time, space, being, and everything beyond in this Universe; that is the one supreme, universal spirit.; The one supreme, all pervading Spirit that is the origin and support of the phenomenal universe.)

Brahman is discussed in Hindu texts with the concept of Atman (Self), personal, (Note: Saguna Brahman, with qualities) impersonal (Note: Nirguna Brahman, without qualities) or Para Brahman, (Note: Supreme) or in various combinations of these qualities depending on the philosophical school. In dualistic schools of Hinduism such as the theistic Dvaita Vedanta, Brahman is different from Atman (Self) in each being, and therein it shares conceptual framework of God in major world religions. In non-dual schools of Hinduism such as the monist Advaita Vedanta, Brahman is identical to the Atman, Brahman is everywhere and inside each living being, and there is connected spiritual oneness in all existence.

The Upanishads contain several mahā-vākyas or "Great Sayings" on the concept of Brahman:

| Text | Upanishad | Translation | Reference |
|---|---|---|---|
| अहं ब्रह्म अस्मि aham brahmāsmi | Brihadaranyaka Upanishad 1.4.10 | "I am Brahman" | |
| अयम् आत्मा ब्रह्म ayam ātmā brahma | Brihadaranyaka Upanishad 4.4.5 | "The Self is Brahman" | |
| सर्वं खल्विदं ब्रह्म sarvam khalvidam brahma | Chandogya Upanishad 3.14.1 | "All this is Brahman" | |
| एकमेवाद्वितीयम् ekam evadvitiyam | Chandogya Upanishad 6.2.1 | "That [Brahman] is one, without a second" | |
| तत्त्वमसि tat tvam asi | Chandogya Upanishad 6.8.7 et seq. | "Thou art that" ("You are Brahman") | |
| प्रज्ञानं ब्रह्म prajnānam brahma | Aitareya Upanishad 3.3.7 | "Knowledge is Brahman" | |

=== Saguna and nirguna ===
While Hinduism sub-schools such as Advaita Vedanta emphasize the complete equivalence of Brahman and Atman, they also expound on Brahman as saguna Brahman—the Brahman with attributes, and nirguna Brahman—the Brahman without attributes. The nirguna Brahman is the Brahman as it really is, however, the saguna Brahman is posited as a means to realizing nirguna Brahman, but the Hinduism schools declare saguna Brahman to be ultimately illusory. The concept of the saguna Brahman, such as in the form of avatars, is considered in these schools of Hinduism to be a useful symbolism, path and tool for those who are still on their spiritual journey, but the concept is finally cast aside by the fully enlightened.

The Bhakti movement of Hinduism built its theosophy around two concepts of Brahman—Nirguna and Saguna. Nirguna Brahman was the concept of the Ultimate Reality as formless, without attributes or quality. Saguna Brahman, in contrast, was envisioned and developed as with form, attributes and quality. The two had parallels in the ancient pantheistic unmanifest and theistic manifest traditions, respectively, and traceable to Arjuna-Krishna dialogue in the Bhagavad Gita. It is the same Brahman, but viewed from two perspectives: one from Nirguni knowledge-focus and other from Saguni love-focus, united as Krishna in the Gita. Nirguna bhakta's poetry were Jnana-shrayi, or had roots in knowledge. Saguna bhakta's poetry were Prema-shrayi, or with roots in love. In Bhakti, the emphasis is reciprocal love and devotion, where the devotee loves God, and God loves the devotee.

Nirguna and Saguna Brahman concepts of the Bhakti movement has been a baffling one to scholars, particularly the Nirguni tradition because it offers, states David Lorenzen, "heart-felt devotion to a God without attributes, without even any definable personality". Yet given the "mountains of Nirguni bhakti literature", adds Lorenzen, bhakti for Nirguna Brahman has been a part of the reality of the Hindu tradition along with the bhakti for Saguna Brahman. These were two alternate ways of imagining God during the bhakti movement.

== Ishvara ==
The Yogasutras of Patanjali use the term Ishvara in 11 verses: I.23 through I.29, II.1, II.2, II.32 and II.45. Ever since the Sutra's release, Hindu scholars have debated and commented on who or what is Isvara? These commentaries range from defining Isvara from a "personal god" to "special self" to "anything that has spiritual significance to the individual". Whicher explains that while Patanjali's terse verses can be interpreted both as theistic or non-theistic, Patanjali's concept of Isvara in Yoga philosophy functions as a "transformative catalyst or guide for aiding the yogin on the path to spiritual emancipation".

Patanjali defines Isvara (Sanskrit: ईश्वर) in verse 24 of Book 1, as "a special Self (पुरुषविशेष, puruṣa-viśeṣa)",

Sanskrit: क्लेश कर्म विपाकाशयैःपरामृष्टः पुरुषविशेष ईश्वरः ॥२४॥
– Yoga Sutras I.24

This sutra of Yoga philosophy of Hinduism adds the characteristics of Isvara as that special Self which is unaffected (अपरामृष्ट, aparamrsta) by one's obstacles/hardships (क्लेश, klesha), one's circumstances created by past or one's current actions (कर्म, karma), one's life fruits (विपाक, vipâka), and one's psychological dispositions/intentions (आशय, ashaya).

Among various Bhakti path practicing sects of Hinduism, which built upon the Yoga school of Hinduism, Isvara only means a specific deity such as Shiva.

== Svayam Bhagavan ==
Svayam Bhagavan, a Sanskrit theological term, is the concept of absolute representation of the monotheistic God as Bhagavan himself within Hinduism. The theological interpretation of svayam bhagavān differs with each tradition and the translated from the Sanskrit language, the term literary means "Bhagavan Himself" or "directly Bhagavan." Earlier commentators such as Madhvacharya translated the term Svayam Bhagavan as "he who has bhagavatta"; meaning "he who has the quality of possessing all good qualities". The term is seldom used to refer to other forms of Krishna and Vishnu within the context of certain religious texts such as the Bhagavata Purana, and also within other sects of Vaishnavism.

The theological interpretation of Svayam Bhagavān differs with each tradition and the literal translation of the term has been understood in several distinct ways. Translated from the Sanskrit language, the term literary means "Bhagavan Himself" or "directly Bhagavan". Others have translated it simply as "the Lord Himself".

The International Society for Krishna Consciousness often translates it within its perspective as primeval Lord or original Personality of Godhead, but also considers the terms such as Supreme Personality of Godhead and Supreme God as an equivalent to the term Svayam Bhagavan, and may also choose to apply these terms to Vishnu, Narayana and many of their associated Avatars. It should be however noted that although it is usual to speak of Vishnu as the source of the avatars, this is only one of the names of god of Vaishnavism, who is also known as Narayana, Vasudeva and Krishna and behind each of those names there is a divine figure with attributed supremacy in Vaishnavism.

=== Krishnaism ===
Within Hinduism, Krishna is worshiped from a variety of perspectives. Krishnaism is a tradition related to Vaishnavism wherein Krishna is considered Svayam Bhagavan, meaning 'God Himself', and this title is used exclusively to designate Krishna as the Supreme God. Krishnaite traditions of Hinduism consider him to be the source of all avatars, and the source of Vishnu himself, or to be the same as Narayana. As such, he is therefore regarded as Svayam Bhagavan.

In Gaudiya Vaishnava Krishna-centered theology, the title Svayam Bhagavan is used exclusively to designate Krishna. Krishna is recognized to be Svayam Bhagavan in the belief of Gaudiya Vaishnavism and Dvaita sub-school of Hindu philosophy, the Pushtimarg tradition, in the Nimbarka Sampradaya, where Krishna is accepted to be the source of all other avatars, and the source of Vishnu himself. Gaudiya Vaishnavas and followers of the Pushtimarg tradition and Nimbarka Sampradaya use the Gopala Tapani Upanishad, and the Bhagavata Purana, to support their view that Krishna is indeed the Svayam Bhagavan. This belief was summarized by the 16th century author Jiva Goswami in some of his works, such as Krishna-sandarbha.

=== Vaishnavism ===
In other sub-traditions of Vaishnavism, Krishna is one of many aspects and avatars of Vishnu (Rama is another, for example), recognized and understood from an eclectic assortment of perspectives and viewpoints. Vaishnavism is one of the earliest single God focussed traditions that derives its heritage from the Vedas.

When followers of Vishnu-centered sampradayas of Vaishnavism describe Krishna as "Svayam Bhagavan" it refers to their belief that Krishna is among the highest and fullest of all avatars and is considered to be the "paripurna Avatara", complete in all respects and the same as the original. According to them Krishna is described in the Bhagavata Purana as the Purnavatara (or complete manifestation) of the Bhagavan, while other incarnations are called partial.

In Sri Vaishnavism, Krishna is viewed as one of the many avatars of Narayana or Vishnu. The Sri Vaishnavism sub-tradition reveres goddess Lakshmi with god Vishnu as equivalent, and traces it roots its roots to the ancient Vedas and Pancaratra texts in Sanskrit.

== See also ==
- Hindu views on God and gender
- Prajapati
- Adi parashakti
- Soham (Sanskrit)
- Hiranyagarbha sukta
- Nasadiya sukta
- Names of God
- Conceptions of God
- God in Theosophy
- Arya Samaj
- ISKCON
