= Polytheism =

Worship of or belief in multiple deities

Polytheism is the belief in or worship of more than one deity, a type of theism; it contrasts with monotheism, the belief in only one deity that is, in most cases, transcendent. The term was coined by Jewish writer Philo of Alexandria as a compound of the Greek words πολύ (lit: "many") and θεός (lit: "god") to argue with the Greeks, though was in modern times re-popularised by Jean Bodin in the 16th century and then by Samuel Purchas in 1614.

Oftentimes, polytheistic religions reflect belief in a pantheon of deities that may themselves have religious sects and rituals dedicated to them. These deities can sometimes be representations of natural forces or ancestral principles; they can be viewed either as autonomous, or as emanations of a greater deity or transcendental absolute being (such as in monistic theology), in either case manifesting immanently in nature (such as in panentheistic and pantheistic theology).

Polytheists do not exclusively worship all deities equally. Another position, identified as monolatry, kathenotheism, or henotheism (though the last one is controversial), recognises the existence of multiple deities while focusing worship to one deity or a specific group of deities, perhaps at certain times or in specific contexts. Moreover, according to Oxford Reference, "it is not easy to count gods, and so not always obvious whether an apparently polytheistic religion is really so, or whether the apparent different objects of worship are to be thought of as manifestations [of a singular divinity]."

Polytheism was common in the time and place of the Abrahamic religions, namely Judaism, Christianity, and Islam. The Quran, central to Islam, quite explicitly denounces polytheism, though there is certainly evidence to suggest that the Hebrew Bible, which Judaism and Christianity are established upon, may have originally been polytheistic to some extent.

Otherwise, there are still some dualistic aspects, such as Satan, and polytheistic aspects, such as saints. Saint Brigid is in fact Brigit, the main goddess of Celtic Ireland. It is well documented throughout history, from prehistory and the earliest records of ancient Egyptian religion and ancient Mesopotamian religion to the religions prevalent during classical antiquity, such as ancient Greek religion and ancient Roman religion, and in ethnic religions such as Germanic, Slavic, and Baltic paganism and Native American religions.

Notable polytheistic religions practiced today include Taoism, Chinese folk religion, Shinto, Santería, most Traditional African religions, and various neopagan faiths such as Wicca and Hellenism.

Hinduism, while popularly held as polytheistic by many scholars, cannot be exclusively categorised as such. Some Hindus consider their beliefs to be monotheistic, henotheistic, panentheistic, pantheistic or monistic. There is no single book representative of a standardised "Hindu" belief; "Hinduism" is better described as an umbrella term for a collection of ideologies found within several Hindu texts.

Vedanta, the most dominant school of Hinduism, offers a combination of pantheism/panentheism and polytheism, holding that Brahman is the sole, ultimate reality of the universe, yet unity with it can be reached by worshipping the innumerable deities that represent the Supreme Absolute Truth. Hindus who practice Bhakti ultimately believe in one deity, known by many titles, such as Paramatman, Parabrahman, Bhagavan, Ishvara, and so on, who transcends all categories (e.g. both of form and formless), with those unaware of these concepts worshipping their own deities each as the ultimate god.

== Soft polytheism vs. hard polytheism ==
A major division in modern polytheistic practices is between so-called "soft" polytheism and "hard" polytheism.

"Soft" polytheism is the belief that different gods may either be psychological archetypes, personifications of natural forces, or as being one essential god interpreted through the lenses of different cultures (e.g. Odin, Zeus, and Indra all being the same god as interpreted by Germanic, Greek, and Indic peoples respectively) – known as omnitheism. In this way, gods may be interchangeable for one another across cultures.

"Hard" polytheism is the belief that gods are distinct, separate, real divine beings, rather than psychological archetypes or personifications of natural forces. Hard polytheists reject the idea that "all gods are one essential god" and may also reject the existence of gods outside their own pantheon altogether.

== Gods and divinity ==
The deities of polytheism are often portrayed as complex personages of greater or lesser status, with individual skills, needs, desires and histories, in many ways similar to humans (anthropomorphic) in their personality traits, but with additional individual powers, abilities, knowledge or perceptions. Polytheism cannot be cleanly separated from the animist beliefs prevalent in most folk religions. The gods of polytheism are in many cases the highest order of a continuum of supernatural beings or spirits, which may include ancestors, demons, wights, and others. In some cases, these spirits are divided into celestial or chthonic classes, and belief in the existence of all these beings does not imply that all are worshipped.

== Types of deities ==
Types of deities often found in polytheism may include:

- Creator deity
- Culture hero
- Death deity (chthonic)
- Life-death-rebirth deity
- Love deity
- Mother goddess
- Political deity (such as a king or emperor)
- Sky deity (celestial)
- Solar deity
- Trickster deity
- Water deity
- Lunar deity
- Deities of music, arts, science, farming, or other endeavors

== Religion and mythology ==
In the Classical era, 4th century CE Neoplatonist Sallustius categorized mythology into five types:

1. Theological: myths that contemplate the essence of the gods, such as Cronus swallowing his children, which Sallustius regarded as expressing in allegory the essence of divinity
2. Physical: expressing the activities of gods in the world
3. Psychological: myths as allegories of the activities of the soul itself or the soul's acts of thought
4. Material: regarding material objects as gods, for example: to call the earth Gaia, the ocean Okeanos, or heat Typhon
5. Mixed

The beliefs of many historical polytheistic religions are commonly referred to as "mythology", though the stories cultures tell about their gods should be distinguished from their worship or religious practice. For instance, deities portrayed in conflict in mythology were often nonetheless worshipped side by side, illustrating the distinction within the religion between belief and practice. Scholars such as Jaan Puhvel, J. P. Mallory, and Douglas Q. Adams have reconstructed aspects of the ancient Proto-Indo-European religion from which the religions of the various Indo-European peoples are thought to derive, which is believed to have been an essentially naturalist numenistic religion. An example of a religious notion from this shared past is the concept of *dyēws, which is attested in several Indo-European religious systems.

== Ancient and historical religions ==
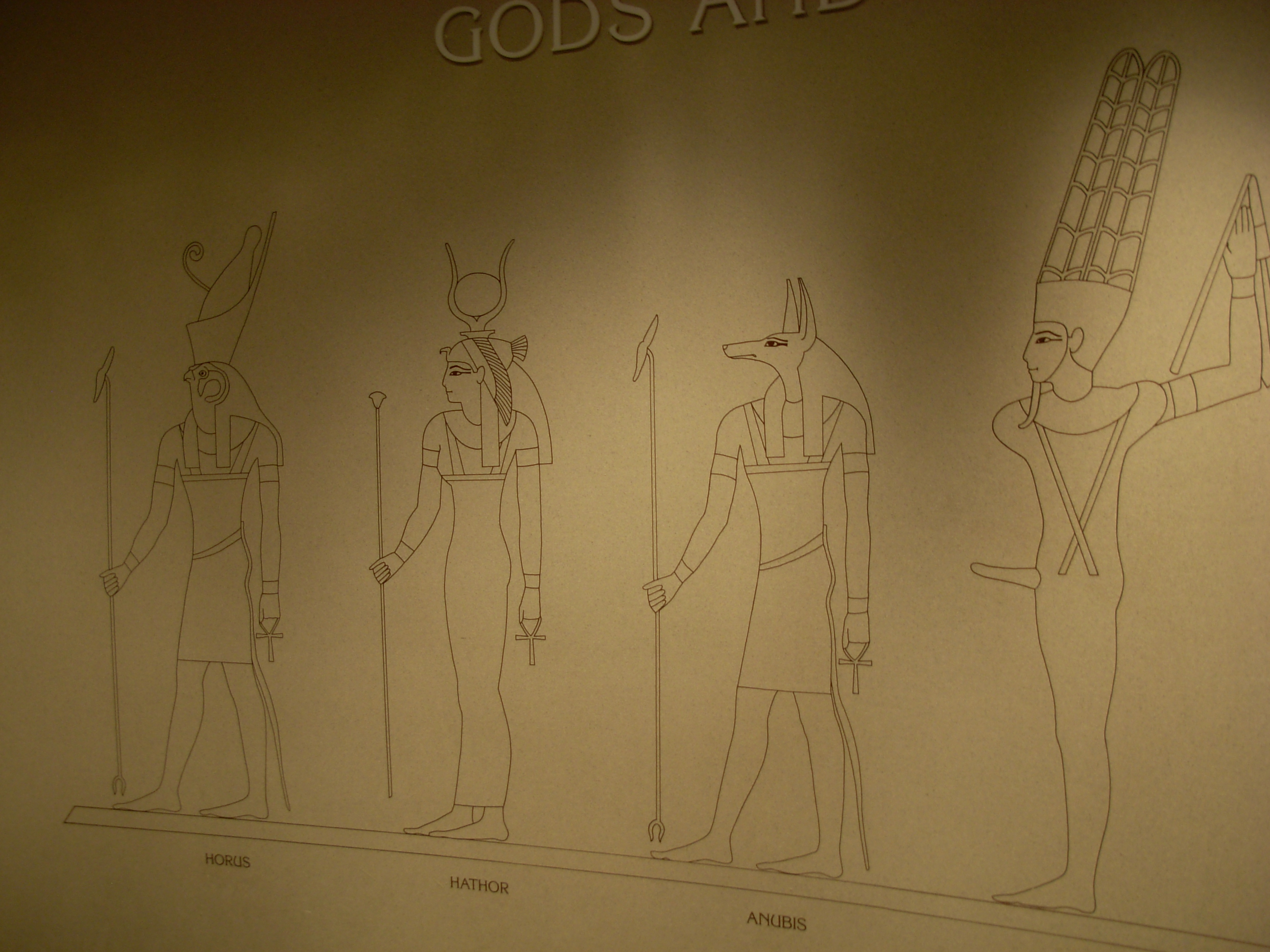
Egyptian gods in the Carnegie Museum of Natural History

Well-known historical polytheistic pantheons include the Sumerian gods, the Egyptian gods, the pantheon attested in classical antiquity (in ancient Greek and Roman religion), the Norse Æsir and Vanir, the Yoruba Orisha, (Note: Yoruba religion has been variously described as henotheistic, polytheistic or as diffused monotheism.) and the Aztec gods.

In many civilizations, pantheons tended to grow over time. Deities first worshipped as the patrons of cities or other places came to be collected together as empires extended over larger territories. Conquests could lead to the subordination of a culture's pantheon to that of the invaders, as in the Greek Titanomachia, and possibly also the Æsir–Vanir War in the Norse mythos. Cultural exchange could lead to "the same" deity being revered in two places under different names, as seen with the Greeks, Etruscans, and Romans, and also to the cultural transmission of elements of an extraneous religion, as with the ancient Egyptian deity Osiris, who was later worshipped in ancient Greece.

Most ancient belief systems held that gods influenced human lives. However, the Greek philosopher Epicurus held that the gods were incorruptible but material, blissful beings who inhabited the empty spaces between worlds and did not trouble themselves with the affairs of mortals, but could be perceived by the mind, especially during sleep.

=== Ancient Greece ===
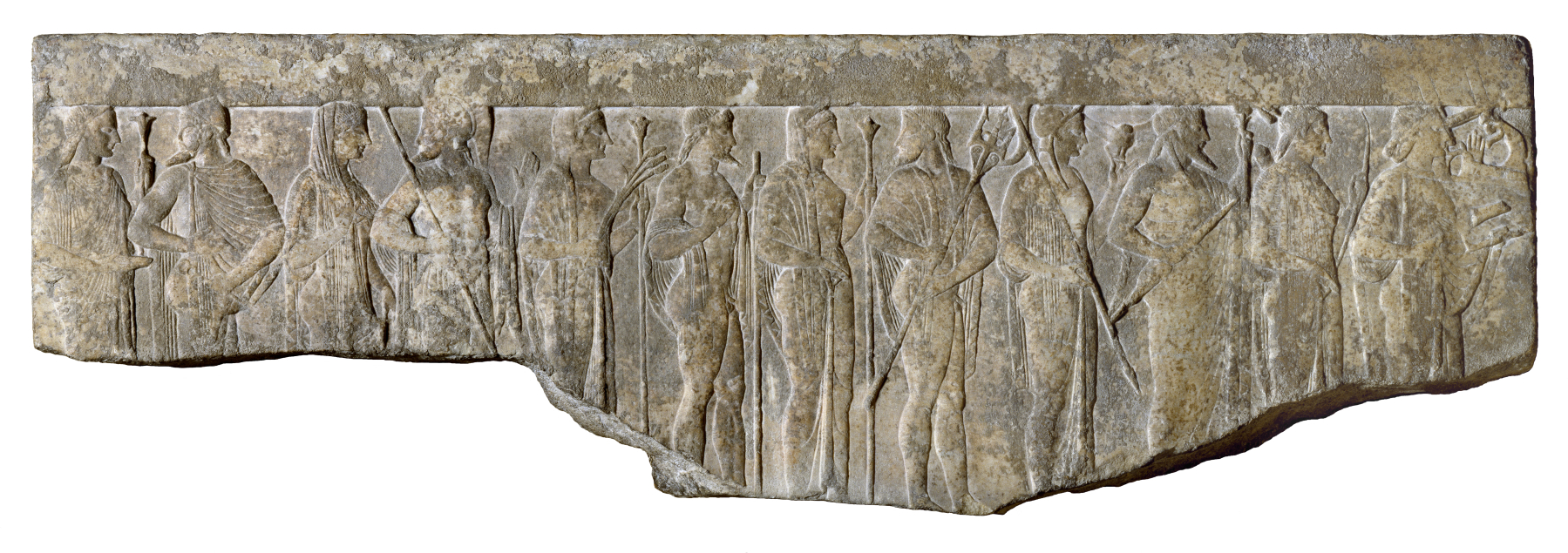
Procession of the Twelve Olympians

The classical scheme in Ancient Greece of the Twelve Olympians (the Canonical Twelve of art and poetry) were: Zeus, Hera, Poseidon, Athena, Ares, Demeter, Apollo, Artemis, Hephaestus, Aphrodite, Hermes, and Hestia. Though it is suggested that Hestia stepped down when Dionysus was invited to Mount Olympus, this is a matter of controversy. Robert Graves' The Greek Myths cites two sources that obviously do not suggest Hestia surrendered her seat, though he suggests she did. Hades was often excluded because he dwelt in the underworld. All of the gods had a power. There was, however, a great deal of fluidity as to who was counted among their number in antiquity. Different cities often worshipped the same deities, sometimes with epithets that distinguished them and specified their local nature.

Hellenic Polytheism extended beyond mainland Greece, to the islands and coasts of Ionia in Asia Minor, to Magna Graecia (Sicily and southern Italy), and to scattered Greek colonies in the Western Mediterranean, such as Massalia (Marseille). Greek religion tempered Etruscan cult and belief to form much of the later Roman religion. During the Hellenistic Era, philosophical schools like Epicureanism developed distinct theologies. Hellenism is, in practice, primarily centered around polytheistic and animistic worship.

== Folk religions ==
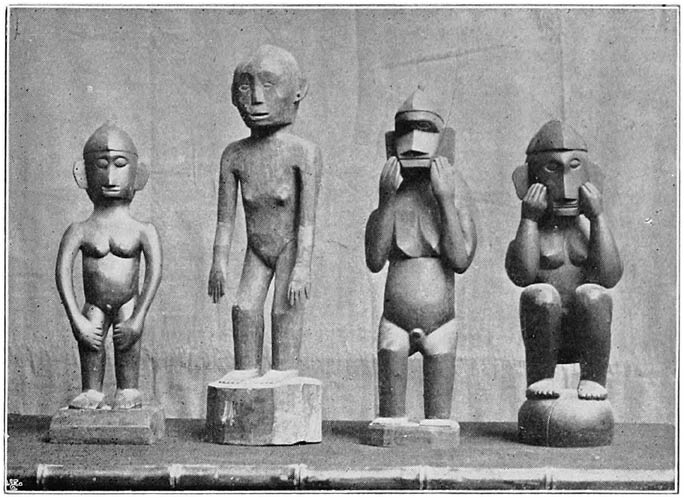
Bulul statues serve as avatars of rice deities in the Anitist beliefs of the Ifugao in the Philippines.

The majority of so-called "folk religions" in the world today (distinguished from traditional ethnic religions) are found in the Asia-Pacific region. This fact conforms to the trend of the majority of polytheist religions being found outside the western world.

Folk religions are often closely tied to animism. Animistic beliefs are found in historical and modern cultures. Folk beliefs are often labeled superstitions when they are present in monotheistic societies. Folk religions often do not have organized authorities, also known as priesthoods, or any formal sacred texts. They often coincide with other religions as well. Abrahamic monotheistic religions, which dominate the western world, typically do not approve of practicing parts of multiple religions, but folk religions often overlap with others. Followers of polytheistic religions do not often problematize following practices and beliefs from multiple religions.

== Modern religions ==
=== Buddhism ===
Depending on the tradition practiced, Buddhism may be seen as polytheistic as it at least acknowledges the existence of multiple gods. The Buddha is a leader figure but is not meant to be worshipped as a god. Devas, a Sanskrit word for gods, are also not meant to be worshipped. They are not immortal and have limited powers. A deva may have been human with positive karma in previous lives and was reborn as a deva. A common Buddhist practice is tantra: the use of rituals to achieve enlightenment. Tantra focuses on seeing oneself as a deity and the use of deities as symbols rather than supernatural agents. Buddhism is most closely aligned with polytheism when it is linked with other religions, often folk religions. For example, the Japanese Shinto religion, in which deities called kami are worshipped, is sometimes syncretized with Buddhism.

=== Christianity ===
Although Christianity is usually described as monotheistic, it is sometimes claimed that the doctrine of the Trinity, upheld by most Christian traditions since late antiquity, precludes pure monotheism. The doctrine posits that God consists of the Father, the Son and the Holy Spirit. Because the deity is three distinct persons, some believe Christianity should be considered a form of tritheism, a form of polytheism. Christianity contends that "one God exists in Three Persons and One Substance," but that the deity cannot be a unitary person with an individual identity. Christianity inherited the idea of "one God" from Judaism and maintains that its monotheistic doctrine is central to the faith.

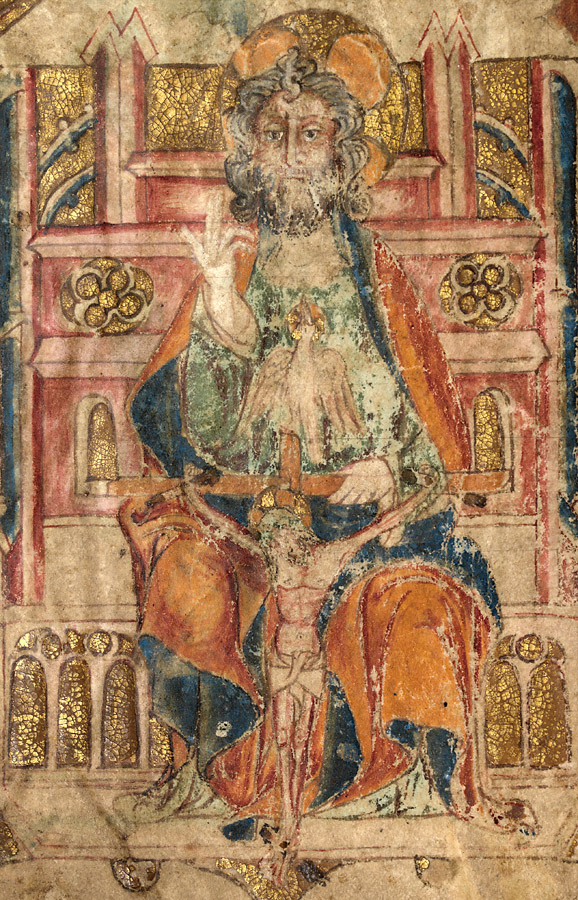
It is sometimes claimed that Christianity is not truly monotheistic because of its idea of the Trinity

Jordan Paper, a Western scholar and self-described polytheist, considers polytheism the normal state of human culture. He argues that "Even the Catholic Church shows polytheistic aspects with the 'veneration' of the saints." On the other hand, he asserts, monotheistic missionaries and scholars were eager to see a proto-monotheism or at least henotheism in polytheistic religions, for example, when taking from the Chinese pair of Sky and Earth only one part and calling it the King of Heaven, as Matteo Ricci did. In 1508, a London Lollard named William Pottier was accused of believing in six gods.

==== Mormonism ====
Joseph Smith, the founder of the Latter Day Saint movement, believed in "the plurality of Gods", saying, "I have always declared God to be a distinct personage, Jesus Christ a separate and distinct personage from God the Father, and that the Holy Ghost was a distinct personage and a Spirit: and these three constitute three distinct personages and three Gods." Mormonism, which emerged from Protestantism, teaches exaltation, which is defined as the hypothesis that people can, in all ways, become like God in the afterlife. Mormonism also affirms the existence of a Heavenly Mother, and the prevailing view among Mormons is that God the Father was once a man who lived on a planet with his own higher God, and became perfect after following this higher God. Some critics of Mormonism argue that statements in the Book of Mormon describe a trinitarian conception of God (e.g. 2 Nephi 31:21; Alma 11:44), but were superseded by later revelations. Due to teachings within Mormon cosmology, some theologians claim that it allows for an infinite number of gods.

Mormon theology posits that scriptural statements on the unity of the Father, the Son, and the Holy Ghost represent a unity of purpose, not substance. They believe that the early Christian Church did not characterize divinity in terms of an immaterial, formless, shared substance until post-apostolic theologians began to incorporate Greek metaphysical philosophies (such as Neoplatonism) into Christian doctrine. Mormons believe that the truth about God's nature was restored through modern-day revelation, which reinstated the original Judeo-Christian concept of a natural, corporeal, immortal God, who is the literal father of the spirits of humans. It is to this personage alone that Mormons pray, as he is and always will be their Heavenly Father, the supreme "God of gods" (Deuteronomy 10:17). In the sense that Mormons worship only God the Father, they consider themselves monotheists. Nevertheless, Mormons adhere to Jesus's teaching that those who receive God's Word can obtain the title of "gods" (John 10:33–36) because, as literal children of God, they can take upon themselves his divine attributes. Mormons teach that "The glory of God is intelligence" (Doctrine and Covenants 93:36), and that it is by sharing the Father's perfect comprehension of all things that both Jesus and the Holy Spirit are also divine.

=== Hinduism ===
Hinduism is neither a monolithic religion nor an organized religion: a wide variety of religious traditions and practices are grouped under this umbrella term, and some modern scholars have questioned the legitimacy of unifying them artificially and suggest that one should speak of "Hinduisms" in the plural. Theistic Hinduism encompasses both monotheistic and polytheistic tendencies and variations on or mixes of both structures.

Hindus venerate deities in the form of the pratima, or idol. The puja (worship) of the pratima is like a way to communicate with the formless, abstract divinity (Brahman in Hinduism) which creates, sustains and dissolves creation. However, some sects have advocated that there is no need to give a shape to God and that it is omnipresent and beyond what humans can see or feel tangibly. These gods were not worshipped without a proper consecration ritual. It was believed that after the consecration ritual, the idol no longer remained as stone or metal and attained a temporary or permanent state of divinity.

Some Hindu philosophers and theologians argue for a transcendent metaphysical structure with a single divine essence. This divine essence is usually referred to as Brahman or Atman, but the understanding of the nature of this absolute divine essence is the line which defines many Hindu philosophical traditions such as Vedanta.

Among lay Hindus, some believe in different deities emanating from Brahman, while others practice more traditional polytheism and henotheism. These practices focus worship on one or more personal deities while granting the existence of others.

Academically speaking, the ancient Vedic scriptures, upon which Hinduism is derived, describe four authorized disciplic lines of teaching coming down over thousands of years. (Padma Purana). Four propound that the Absolute Truth is Fully Personal, as in Judeo-Christian theology. They say that the Primal Original God is Personal, both transcendent and immanent throughout creation. He can be and is often approached through worship of Prathimas, called "Archa-Vigraha", described in the Vedas as identical to his various dynamic, spiritual Forms. This is the Vaisnava theology.

The fifth disciplic line of Vedic spirituality, founded by Adi Shankaracharya, promotes the concept that the Absolute is Brahman, without clear differentiations, will, thought, or intelligence.

In the Smarta denomination of Hinduism, the philosophy of Advaita expounded by Shankara allows veneration of numerous deities with the understanding that all of them are but manifestations of one impersonal divine power, Brahman. Therefore, according to various schools of Vedanta including Shankara, which is the most influential and important Hindu theological tradition, there are a great number of deities in Hinduism, such as Vishnu, Shiva, Ganesha, Hanuman, Lakshmi, Kali, Parvati, Durga, Rama, Krishna but they are essentially different forms of the same "Being". However, many Vedantic philosophers also argue that the same impersonal, divine power united all individuals in the form of the Atman.

Many other Hindus, however, view polytheism as far preferable to monotheism. Ram Swarup, for example, points to the Vedas as being specifically polytheistic, (Goel includes Ram Swarup's "In the Vedic approach, there is no single God. This is bad enough. But the Hindus do not have even a supreme God, a fuhrer-God who presides over a multiplicity of Gods."): and states that, "only some form of polytheism alone can do justice to this variety and richness."

Nasadiya Sukta (Hymn of non-Eternity, origin of universe):

There was neither non-existence nor existence then;

Neither the realm of space, nor the sky which is beyond;

What stirred? Where? In whose protection?

There was neither death nor immortality then;

No distinguishing sign of night nor of day;

That One breathed, windless, by its own impulse;

Other than that there was nothing beyond.

Darkness there was at first, by darkness hidden;

Without distinctive marks, this all was water;

That which, becoming, by the void was covered;

That One by force of heat came into being;

Who really knows? Who will here proclaim it?

Whence was it produced? Whence is this creation?

Gods came afterwards, with the creation of this universe.

Who then knows whence it has arisen?

Whether God's will created it, or whether He was mute;

Perhaps it formed itself, or perhaps it did not;

The Supreme Brahman of the world, all pervasive and all knowing

He indeed knows, if not, no one knows

-Rig Veda 10.129 (Abridged, Tr: Kramer / Christian)

Some Hindus construe this notion of polytheism in the sense of polymorphism—one God with many forms or names. The Rig Veda, the primary Hindu scripture, elucidates this as follows:

They call him Indra, Mitra, Varuna, Agni, and he is heavenly nobly-winged Garutman. To what is One, sages give many a title they call it Agni, Yama, Matarisvan. Book I, Hymn 164, Verse 46 Rigveda

=== Zoroastrianism ===
Ahura Mazda is the supreme god, but Zoroastrianism does not deny other deities. Ahura Mazda has yazatas ("good agents"), some of which include Anahita, Sraosha, Mithra, Rashnu, and Tishtrya. Richard Foltz has put forth evidence that Iranians of Pre-Islamic era worshiped all these figures, especially Mithra and Anahita.

Prods Oktor Skjærvø states Zoroastrianism is henotheistic and "a dualistic and polytheistic religion, but with one supreme god, who is the father of the ordered cosmos". Other scholars state that this is unclear, because historic texts present a conflicting picture, ranging from Zoroastrianism's belief in "one god, two gods, or a best god henotheism".

=== Tengrism ===
The nature of Tengrism remains debatable. According to many scholars, Tengrism was originally polytheistic, but a monotheistic branch with the sky god Kök-Tengri as the supreme being evolved as a dynastical legitimation. It is at least agreed that Tengrism formed from the diverse folk religions of the local people and may have had diverse branches.

It is suggested that Tengrism was a monotheistic religion only at the imperial level in aristocratic circles, and, perhaps, only by the 12th–13th centuries (a late form of development of ancient animistic shamanism in the era of the Mongol empire).

According to Jean-Paul Roux, the monotheistic concept evolved from a polytheistic system and was not the original form of Tengrism. The monotheistic concept helped to legitimate the rule of the dynasty: "As there is only one God in Heaven, there can only be one ruler on the earth ...".

Others point out that Tengri itself was never an Absolute, but only one of many gods of the upper world, the sky deity, of polytheistic shamanism, later known as Tengrism.

The term also describes several contemporary Turko-Mongolic native religious movements and teachings. All modern adherents of "political" Tengrism are monotheists.

=== Modern paganism ===
Modern paganism, also known as neopaganism and contemporary paganism, is a group of contemporary religious movements influenced by or claiming to be derived from the various historical pagan beliefs of pre-modern Europe. Although they have commonalities, contemporary pagan religious movements are diverse, and no single set of beliefs, practices, or texts are shared by them all.

Founder of Wicca Gerald Gardner helped to revive ancient polytheism. English occultist Dion Fortune was a major populiser of soft polytheism. In her novel The Sea Priestess, she wrote, "All gods are one god, and all goddesses are one goddess, and there is one initiator."

==== Reconstructionism ====
Reconstructionist polytheists apply scholarly disciplines such as history, archaeology, and language study to revive ancient, traditional religions that have been fragmented, damaged, or even destroyed, such as Norse paganism, Roman and Celtic. A reconstructionist endeavors to revive and reconstruct an authentic practice based on the ancestors' ways but workable in contemporary life. These polytheists sharply differ from neopagans in that they consider their religion not only as inspired by historical religions but, in many cases, as a continuation or revival of those religions.

==== Wicca ====
Wicca is a duotheistic faith created by Gerald Gardner that allows for polytheism. Wiccans specifically worship the Lord and Lady of the Isles (their names are oathbound). It is an orthopraxic mystery religion that requires initiation to the priesthood to consider oneself Wiccan. Wicca emphasizes duality and the cycle of nature.

=== Serer ===
In Africa, polytheism in Serer religion dates to the Neolithic Era or possibly earlier, when the ancient ancestors of the Serer people represented their Pangool on the Tassili n'Ajjer. The supreme creator deity in the Serer religion is Roog. However, there are many deities and Pangool (singular: Fangool, the interceders with the divine) in the Serer religion. Each has its own purpose and serves as Roog's agent on Earth. Amongst the Cangin speakers, a sub-group of the Serers, Roog is known as Koox.

== Use as a term of abuse ==
The term "polytheist" is sometimes used by Sunni Muslim extremist groups such as Islamic State of Iraq and the Levant (ISIL) as a derogatory reference to Shiite Muslims, whom they view as having "strayed from Islam's monotheistic creed because of the reverence they show for historical figures, like Imam Ali".

Paul Vitz, an opponent of Selfism [sic], termed the United States a "most polytheistic nation".

The term has occasionally been used by Protestant thinkers, such as Samuel Purchas, as an anti-papist condemnation of worship of "Saints, Images, and the Host".

== Polydeism ==
Polydeism is a portmanteau referencing a polytheistic form of deism, encompassing the belief that the universe was the collective creation of multiple gods, each of whom created a piece of the universe or multiverse and then ceased to intervene in its evolution. The term is a compound of the Greek πολύ ("many") and Latin deus ("god").

This concept addresses an apparent contradiction in deism, that a monotheistic God created the universe, but now expresses no apparent interest in it, by supposing that, if the universe is the construct of many gods, none of them would have an interest in the universe as a whole.

Creighton University Philosophy professor William O. Stephens, who has taught this concept, suggests that C. D. Broad projected this concept in Broad's 1925 article, "The Validity of Belief in a Personal God". Broad noted that the arguments for the existence of God only tend to prove that "a designing mind had existed in the past, not that it does exist now. It is quite compatible with this argument that God should have died long ago, or that he should have turned his attention to other parts of the Universe", and notes in the same breath that "there is nothing in the facts to suggest that there is only one such being". Stephens contends that Broad, in turn, derived the concept from David Hume. Stephens states:

David Hume's criticisms of the argument from design include the argument that, for all we know, a committee of very powerful, but not omnipotent, divine beings could have collaborated in creating the world, but then afterwards left it alone or even ceased to exist. This would be polydeism.

This use of the term appears to originate at least as early as Robert M. Bowman Jr.'s 1997 essay, Apologetics from Genesis to Revelation. Bowman wrote:

Materialism (illustrated by the Epicureans), represented today by atheism, skepticism, and deism. The materialist may acknowledge superior beings, but they do not believe in a Supreme Being. Epicureanism was founded about 300 BC by Epicurus. Their world view might be called "polydeism:" there are many gods, but they are merely superhuman beings; they are remote, uninvolved in the world, posing no threat and offering no hope to human beings. Epicureans regarded traditional religion and idolatry as harmless enough as long as the gods were not feared or expected to do or say anything.

Sociologist Susan Starr Sered used the term in her 1994 book, Priestess, Mother, Sacred Sister: Religions Dominated by Women, which includes a chapter titled, "No Father in Heaven: Androgyny and Polydeism". She writes that she has "chosen to gloss on 'polydeism' a range of beliefs in more than one supernatural entity". Sered used this term in a way that would encompass polytheism, rather than exclude much of it, as she intended to capture both polytheistic systems and nontheistic systems that assert the influence of "spirits or ancestors". This use of the term, however, does not accord with the historical misuse of deism as a concept to describe an absent creator god.

== See also ==
- Animism
- Diffused monotheism
- Ethnic religion
- Hellenismos
- Henotheism
- Judgement of Paris
- Kathenotheism
- Monolatry
- Panentheism
- Pantheism
- Polytheistic reconstructionism
- Shirk (polytheism)
- West African Vodun

== Bibliography ==
- Adler, Margot (2006) [1979]. Drawing Down the Moon: Witches, Druids, Goddess-Worshippers and Other Pagans in America (Revised ed.). London: Penguin. ISBN 978-0-14-303819-1.
- Alici, Mustafa (2011). "The Idea of God in Ancient Turkish Religion According to Raffaele Pettazzoni. A Comparison with the Turkish Historian of Religions Hikmet Tanyu". SMSR. 77 (1): 137–54.
- Bira, Shagdaryn (2011). Монголын тэнгэрийн үзэл: түүвэр зохиол, баримт бичгүүд [Mongolian Tengerism: selected papers and documents] (in Mongolian). Ulaanbaatar: Sodpress. ISBN 9789992955932.
- Carpenter, Dennis D. (1996). "Emergent Nature Spirituality: An Examination of the Major Spiritual Contours of the Contemporary Pagan Worldview". In Lewis, James R. (ed.). Magical Religion and Modern Witchcraft. Albany: State University of New York Press. ISBN 978-0-7914-2890-0.
- Gumilyov, Lev N. (1967). "Гл. 7. Религия тюркютов" [Chapter 7. Religion of the Turkuts]. Древние тюрки [The Ancient Turks] (in Russian). Москва: Наука.
- Hanegraaff, Wouter J. (1996). New Age Religion and Western Culture: Esotericism in the Mirror of Secular Thought. Leiden: Brill. ISBN 978-90-04-10696-3.
- Klyashtornyj, Sergei G. (2008). Spinei, V. and C. (ed.). Old Turkic Runic Texts and History of the Eurasian Steppe. Bucureşti/Brăila: Editura Academiei Române; Editura Istros a Muzeului Brăilei.
- Kodar, Auezkhan (2009). "Тенгрианство в контексте монотеизма" [Tengriism in context of monotheism]. Новые Исследования Тувы (in Russian) (1–2).
- —— (22 March 2006). "Tengrism: In Search for Central Asia's Spiritual Roots" (PDF). Central Asia-Caucasus Analyst. 8 (6): 3–4. Archived from the original (PDF) on 7 December 2006.
- Lewis, James R. (2004). The Oxford Handbook of New Religious Movements. Oxford University Press. p. 13. ISBN 0-19-514986-6.
- Pettazzoni, Raffaele (1956) [1955]. "Turco-Mongols and Related Peoples". The All-Knowing God. Researches into Early Religion and Culture. Translated by H. J. Rose. London.
- Róna-Tas, A. (1987). W. Heissig; H.-J. Klimkeit (eds.). "Materialien zur alten Religion den Turken: Synkretismus in den Religionen zentralasiens" [Materials on the ancient religion of the Turks: syncretism in the religions of Central Asia]. Studies in Oriental Religions (in German). 13. Wiesbaden: 33–45.
- —— (1956). "Tängri. Essai sur le ciel-dieu des peuples altaïques" [Tängri. An Essay on the Deities of the Altaic Peoples]. Revue de l'histoire des religions (in French).
- ——, ed. (1984). La religion des Turcs et des Mongols [The Religion of the Turks and Mongols] (in French). Paris: Payot.
- Stebleva, Irina V. (1971). "К реконструкции древнетюркской мифологической системы" [To the reconstruction of the ancient Turkic mythological system]. Тюркологический сборник (in Russian). Москва: АН СССР.
- Tanyu, Hikmet (1980). İslâmlıktan Önce Türkler'de Tek Tanrı İnancı [The Belief of Monotheism among Pre-Islamic Turks] (in Turkish). İstanbul.
