= Henotheism =

Worshipping a god, accepting others may exist

Henotheism is the worship of a single, supreme god that does not deny the existence or possible existence of other deities that may be worshipped. Friedrich Schelling (1775–1854) coined the word, and Friedrich Welcker (1784–1868) used it to depict primitive monotheism among ancient Greeks.

Max Müller (1823–1900), a German-British philologist and orientalist, brought the term into wider usage in his scholarship on the Indian religions, particularly Hinduism, whose scriptures mention and praise numerous deities as if they are one ultimate unitary divine essence. Müller made the term central to his criticism of Western theological and religious exceptionalism (relative to Eastern religions), focusing on a cultural dogma which held "monotheism" to be both fundamentally well-defined and inherently superior to differing concepts of God.

== Definition and terminology ==
Friedrich Schelling coined the German term Henotheismus, from the Greek ἕν (hén, lit. 'one') and German Theismus ('theism'), the latter of which derives from θεός (theós, lit. 'god'). The term refers to a form of theism in which devotees worship a single god, albeit not as the only god. Related terms include monolatry and kathenotheism. kathenotheism ( καθ' ἕνα θεόν, kath’ héna theón, 'one god at a time') is an extension of "henotheism". Henotheism refers to a monistic theology wherein different deities are understood to be fundamentally derived from one, equivalent divine essence. Another term related to henotheism is "equitheism", referring to the belief that all gods are equal. Furthermore, the term henotheism does not exclude nondualism or dualism.

Various scholars prefer the term monolatry to henotheism to describe religions in which a single god is central, but the existence or the position of other gods is not denied. According to Christoph Elsas, henotheism in its modern application connotes a syncretic stage in the development of religions of late antiquity. A henotheist may worship a single god from a pantheon of deities at a given time, while accepting other deities and conceptions of deity. Henotheism and inclusive monotheism are terms that refer to a middle position between unlimited polytheism and exclusive monotheism.

== Zoroastrianism ==
Zoroastrianism is often regarded as one of history's oldest monotheistic religions. Although Ahura Mazda is the religion's supreme God, Zoroastrianism accepts lesser divinities known as yazatas ('good agents') as worthy of worship, as well. The yazatas include Anahita, Sraosha, Mithra, Rashnu, and Tishtrya. According to some scholars, two issues have long made identifying Zoroastrianism as purely monotheistic problematic: its worship of lesser deities alongside Ahura Mazda and its cosmological dualism. Before hastening to conclude that the Amesha Spenta and the other yazatas compromise the religion's purity of monotheism, one should consider that other monotheisms also include supernatural beings in their theologies alongside a singular creator God:

- Angels in post-exilic Judaism and later Christianity, which Boyce and Grenet argue were based on the Amesha Spenta.
- The saints and Mary, mother of Jesus, in several Christian denominations.
- The persons of the Trinity in trinitarian Christianity.

Despite their theological differences from Zoroastrianism, early Judaism and mainstream Christianity recognized beings subordinate to God as divine agents or helpers. In Christianity, the persons of the Trinity were understood as co-equal with one another and with God; they were not understood as able to pursue interests separate from God or to receive worship independently. Others, such as Richard Foltz, have put forth evidence that Iranians of the pre-Islamic era worshipped all these figures, especially Mithra and Anahita.

Prods Oktor Skjærvø states Zoroastrianism is henotheistic and "a dualistic and polytheistic religion… with one supreme god, who is the father of the ordered cosmos". Other scholars state that this is unclear because historical Zoroastrian texts present a conflicting picture, ranging between beliefs in "one god, two gods, or a best god henotheism".

== Hinduism ==
To what is One

They call him Indra, Mitra, Varuna, Agni,
and he is heavenly-winged Garutman.
To what is One, sages give many a title.

— Rigveda 1.164.46
Transl: Klaus Klostermaier

Henotheism was the term used by scholars such as Max Müller to describe the theology of the historical Vedic religion. Müller noted that the hymns of the Rigveda, the oldest scripture of Hinduism, mention many deities, but praises them successively as the "one ultimate, supreme God" (or, alternatively, as "one supreme Goddess"), thereby asserting that the essence of the deities was unitary (ekam) and that the deities were nothing but manifestations of the same concept of the divine (i.e., God).

The Vedic-era conceptualization of the divine, or "the One" (i.e., Brahman), argues Jeaneane Fowler, is more abstract than a monotheistic God: it is the ultimate reality underlying and of the phenomenal universe. The Vedic hymns treat it as "limitless, indescribable, absolute principle"; thus, the Vedic theology is more comparable to panentheism than to henotheism. In the late Vedic era, around the start of the Upanishadic age (c. 800 BCE), theosophical speculations emerged that eventually evolved into nondualism and monism, as well as forms of nontheism and pantheism. An example of the questioning of the concept of God, in addition to henotheistic hymns found therein, are in later portions of the Rigveda, such as the Nasadiya Sukta. Hinduism refers to metaphysical absolute as Brahman, which contains within itself the transcendent and immanent reality. Different schools of thought interpret may interpret Brahman as personal, impersonal, or transpersonal. Ishwar Chandra Sharma describes it as the "Absolute Reality, beyond all dualities of existence and non-existence, light and darkness, and of time, space and cause."

== Hellenistic religion ==
While the Greek and Roman religions began as polytheisms, during the Classical period—under the influence of philosophy—different theologies emerged. Often, Zeus (or Jupiter) was considered the supreme, all-powerful, and all-knowing king and father of the Olympian gods. According to Maijastina Kahlos, "monotheism was pervasive in the educated circles in Late Antiquity", and "all divinities were interpreted as aspects, particles or epithets of one supreme God". Maximus Tyrius (2nd century CE) stated: "In such a mighty contest, sedition and discord, you will see one according law and assertion in all the earth, that there is one God, the king and father of all things, and many gods, sons of God, ruling together with him." The Neoplatonic philosopher Plotinus taught that above the gods of traditional belief was "the One". Maximus, the polytheist grammarian of Madauros, even stated that "only a madman would deny the existence of the supreme God".

== Canaanite religion and Yahwism ==
Second Temple Judaism was—and Rabbinic Judaism is—emphatically monotheistic. However, its predecessor, Yahwism, the religion of ancient Israel and Judah whose chief deity was Yahweh and which was practiced during the 9th and 8th centuries BCE, has been described as henotheistic or monolatric. For example, the Moabites worshipped the god Chemosh, and the Edomites worshipped Qaus—both of whom were part of the greater Canaanite pantheon—headed by the chief god, El.

The Canaanite pantheon consisted of El and Asherah as its chief deities, with 70 sons who were said to rule over the nations of the Earth, each being worshiped within a specific region. Kurt Noll states that "the Bible preserves a tradition that Yahweh used to 'live' in the south, in the land of Edom" and that the original god of Israel was El Shaddai. Deuteronomy 32:8–9 is often interpreted as depicting El assigning Yahweh to rule over Israel.

Several biblical stories allude to the belief that the Canaanite gods all existed and were thought to possess the most power in the lands by the people who worshiped them and their sacred objects; their power was believed to be real and could be invoked by the people who patronized them. There are numerous accounts of surrounding nations of qIsrael showing fear or reverence for the Israelite God despite their continued polytheistic practices. For instance, in 1 Samuel 4, the Philistines fret before the second battle of Aphek, when they learn that the Israelites are bearing the Ark of the Covenant—and, therefore, Yahweh—into battle. Exodus 20:3 recounts God forbidding the Israelites from worshipping deities other God. According to Christian biblical scholar Mark S. Smith, the stage of theological development described in the book of Exodus is a form monolatry, with the Jewish transition to monotheism occurring only after the Babylonian captivity. Smith argues that Yahweh underwent a process of merging with El and that acceptance of cults of Asherah was common in the period of the Hebrew Bible judges. 2 Kings 3:27 is interpreted by Christian scholar Greg Boyd as describing a human sacrifice in Moab that led the invading Israelite army to fear the power of Chemosh.

== In Christianity ==
Paul the Apostle, in his First Epistle to the Corinthians, writes that "we know that an idol is nothing" and "that there is none other God but one". He argues in verse 5 that "for though there be that are called gods, whether in heaven or in earth", "but to us there is but one God". Some translators of verse 5 put the words "gods" and "lords" in quotes to indicate that they are gods or lords only so-called.

In his Second Epistle to the Corinthians, Paul refers to "the god of this world", which the 18th-century theologian John Gill interpreted as a reference to Satan or the material things put before God, such as money, rather than acknowledging any separate deity from God.

=== The Church of Jesus Christ of Latter-day Saints ===
Some scholars have written that the Church of Jesus Christ of Latter-day Saints (LDS Church) can be characterized as henotheistic but others have rejected that stance. Eugene England, a professor at Brigham Young University, asserted that LDS Presidents Brigham Young and Joseph Fielding Smith along with the LDS scholar B. H. Roberts used the LDS interpretation of 1 Corinthians 8:5–6 as "a brief explanation of how it is possible to be both a Christian polytheist (technically a henotheist) and a monotheist". BYU Professor Roger R. Keller rejected descriptions of the LDS Church as polytheistic by countering, as summarized by a reviewer, "Mormons are fundamentally monotheistic because they deal with only one god out of the many which exist."

In their book, Mormon America: The Power and the Promise, Richard and Joan Ostling, wrote that some Mormons are comfortable describing themselves as henotheists. Kurt Widmer, professor at the University of Lethbridge, described LDS beliefs as a "cosmic henotheism". A review of Widmer's book by Bruening and Paulsen in the FARMS Review of Books countered that Widmer's hypothesis was "strongly disconfirmed in light of the total evidence". Van Hale wrote that "Mormonism teaches the existence of gods who are not the Father, Son, or Holy Ghost" and "the existence of more than one god [is] clearly a Mormon doctrine", but he also said that defining this belief system in theological terms was troublesome. According to Van Hale, henotheism might appear to be "promising" in describing LDS beliefs but is ultimately not accurate because henotheism was intended to describe the worship of a god that was restricted to a specific geographical area.

=== God Worshipping Society ===
The God Worshipping Society was a nontrinitarian form of Protestant Christianity, originating in the 19th century and incorporating elements of Chinese folk religion and Buddhism. It upheld God as the supreme deity. The God Worshipping Society held that there is only one Supreme Emperor God in the world, and therefore denied that the Heavenly Father and the Heavenly Brother Jesus are the same person. Thus, The God Worshipping Society maintained that no one, including the Heavenly Brother Jesus, could be called the Supreme Emperor God — only the Heavenly Father could be so addressed. The God Worshipping Society did not regard Jesus himself as the Supreme Emperor God Jehovah,Hong Xiuquan claimed that Jesus was the Heavenly Father's eldest son,whereas he himself was the Heavenly Father's second son. while Feng Yunshan and Yang Xiuqing were respectively regarded as the third and fourth sons. Wei Changhui, Xiao Chaogui, and Shi Dakai were respectively regarded as the fifth, sixth, and seventh sons. Xiao Chaogui is sometimes said to be the Heavenly Father's fifth son and also the "Imperial Son-in-Law". Xiao Chaogui's wife, Hong Xuanjiao, imitating the "Dingyou Strange Dream" composed by Hong Xiuquan, wove an almost identical mythological narrative. She claimed that in the Dingyou year, she had once fallen gravely ill, and while lying in bed as if on the verge of death, her soul ascended to heaven, where she heard an elder say to her: "Ten years from now, a person will come from the East to teach you how to worship God; you should sincerely obey." She claimed that this confirmed her identity as the Heavenly Father's daughter, though she did not claim to be the Heavenly Father's sixth daughter. Different documents mention different orderings of the so-called sons of the Heavenly Father. Some historians believe that the claims regarding the identities and ranking of Xiao Chaogui, Wei Changhui, and Shi Dakai as sons of the Heavenly Father were fabrications made by later generations. Hong Xiuquan's son was regarded as the nephew of the Heavenly Brother Jesus.

The God Worshipping Society held that the Heavenly Father Jehovah possesses a physical form, and even provided a detailed description of his appearance. In this depiction, the Heavenly Father's appearance closely resembles that of deities in traditional Chinese religious mythology. The God Worshipping Society also held that the Heavenly Father Jehovah is the patriarch of the Heavenly Kingdom, with a wife — the Heavenly Mother — as well as multiple other consorts. When Hong Xiuquan annotated Revelation Chapter 12, he interpreted the "woman" mentioned therein as the Heavenly Father's wife, the "Heavenly Mother," within The God Worshipping Society's doctrine, and claimed that both he and Jesus were born of the Heavenly Mother. He also claimed that other "Ah Ma" (Mothers) gave birth to other children, such as Feng Yunshan. When Hong Xiuquan annotated 1 John 5:6–8 in the Imperially Commissioned Former Scriptures, he interpreted "water and blood" as referring to the Heavenly Father's multiple wives, multiple sons, and multiple daughters. These daughters were considered to be Hong Xiuquan's sisters in heaven. The God Worshipping Society also held that the Heavenly Brother Jesus has a wife — the Heavenly Sister-in-Law. When Hong Xiuquan annotated Revelation, he claimed that "the wife of the Lamb is the Heavenly Sister-in-Law." Hong Xiuquan held that the Heavenly Brother had multiple children.

== Japanese religions ==
In Japan, many Japanese new religions can be considered to be monotheistic (such as Tenrikyo) or henotheistic (such as Konkokyo).

== See also ==
- Comparative religion – Systematic comparison of the world's religions
- Diffused monotheism – Belief in the existence of one God who delegates authority to lesser divinities
- Henosis – Mystical "oneness", "union", or "unity" in classical Greek
- King of the gods – A tendency for one divinity, usually male, to achieve preeminence
- Monolatry – It is the belief in the existence of many gods, but with the consistent worship of only one deity.
