= Ultimate reality =

Supreme, final, and fundamental power in all reality

The ultimate reality is "the supreme, final, and fundamental power in all reality", or that which is metaphysically prior to all of reality. It refers to the most fundamental aspect of reality underlying everything that exists and is often regarded as having the highest value.

The ultimate reality may overlap with the concept of the Absolute in certain philosophies. This concept is linked with religious philosophy, where in Abrahamic religions it is conceived as God, in Hinduism it is conceived as Brahman, in Theravada Buddhism as Nirvana, and in Taoism as the Tao.

== Greek philosophy ==
Anaximander (c. 610 – c. 546 BCE) believed that the ultimate substance of the universe, generally known as arche, was apeiron, an infinite and eternal substance that is the origin of all things.

Aristotle (384–322 BCE) held that the unmoved mover "must be an immortal, unchanging being, ultimately responsible for all wholeness and orderliness in the sensible world" and that its existence is necessary to support everyday change.

Democritus (c. 460–370 BCE) and Epicureanism (c. 307 BCE) rejected the idea of ultimate reality, saying that only atoms and void exist, but they do have the eternal, unbounded, and self-caused nature of non-materialistic views of the concept.

In Neoplatonism (3rd century CE), the first principle of reality is "the One" which is a perfectly simple and ineffable principle which is the source of the universe, and exists without multiplicity and beyond being and non-being.

Stoic physics (c. 300 BCE – 3rd century CE) called the primitive substance of the universe pneuma or God, which is everything that exists and is a creative force that develops and shapes the cosmos.

== Religious philosophy ==
=== Abrahamic religions ===
Abrahamic religions equate God to the ultimate reality. Abrahamic conceptions of God show significant diversity, in which some perspectives consider to be a personal deity, while others have taken more abstract views like classical theism, which centers around an affirmation of divine simplicity, the view that God has no proper parts or attributes separate from his essence (ousia). For example, John Scotus Eriugena held that God's essence is uncaused and incomprehensible. Similarly, Maimonides and Muslim philosophers like Avicenna believed that God is the necessary existence, which is a perfect unity that is ultimately indescribable by positive attributes. This also means that for classical theists, all anthropomorphic imagery used in religious scripture is metaphorical.

However, other theologians like the Atharis affirmed the fact that God has specific describable attributes, including seemingly human ones like having hands and a face. Some modern Western thinkers have also affirmed views which departed from the classical theist view of simplicity. For example, the Jewish philosopher Spinoza famously affirmed a view that has been labeled classical pantheism and panentheism by different authors since it sees the whole universe as being composed of modes of God. Spinoza defined God as a metaphysical substance rather than a personal being, and wrote in Ethics that "blessedness" comes from the love of God, meaning knowledge of reality as it is. Other modern theories include Process theism (which sees the ultimate as a constantly changing process) and Neo-classical theism which allows some concepts like divine complexity, temporality (God has a succession of experiences), mutability (God can change in some ways), and passibility (God is affectable by creation), while still affirming God's essential perfection, necessary existence, and exhaustive foreknowledge, aiming for a more relational, dynamic, and less abstract God than classical theism.

=== Buddhism ===
In Theravada Buddhism, Nirvana is ultimate reality. Nirvana is described in negative terms; it is unconstructed and unconditioned.

Mahāyāna Buddhism has different conceptions of ultimate reality, which is framed within the context of the two truths, the relative truth of everyday things and the ultimate truth. Some traditions, specifically those who rely on the Madhyamaka philosophy, reject the notion of a truly existing or essential ultimate reality, regarding any existent as empty (sunyata) of inherent existence (svabhava). Modern philosophers like Jan Westerhoff interpret this a species of anti-foundationalism, or a metaphysical anti-realism.

Other strands of Mahāyāna thought have a more positive or cataphatic view of the ultimate reality. The Yogācāra school tends to follow an idealistic metaphysics, also called "mind-only" or "the doctrine of consciousness" (Vijñānavāda). Other traditions developed their own unique views of ultimate truth, such as the Madhyamaka influenced Chinese Tiantai school, and the Tibetan Dzogchen tradition. Other examples include those traditions which rely more heavily on Buddha-nature thought, such as East Asian Mahayana schools like Huayan and Tibetan traditions like shentong.

=== Hinduism ===
In Hinduism, Brahman connotes the highest universal principle, the ultimate reality in the universe. In most orthodox schools of Hindu philosophy, Brahman is the material, efficient, formal and final cause of all that exists. It is the pervasive, genderless, infinite, eternal truth and bliss which does not change, yet is the cause of all changes. Brahman as a metaphysical concept is the single binding unity behind diversity in all that exists in the universe.

Nevertheless the different Hindu denominations and schools of thought have different views on ultimate reality and God. Some of the major positions found among Hindu traditions include: henotheism, monotheism (a common stance in Vaishnavism) and monism (Advaita Vedanta) and pantheism.

=== Taoism ===
In Taoism, the Tao is the impersonal principle that underlies reality. It is a metaphysical principle and process that refers to how nature develops, being an enigmatic process of transformation. It is described as the source of existence, an ineffable mystery, and something that can be individually harnessed for the good. It is thought of as being "the flow of the universe" and the source of its order and its qi, but it is not considered a deity to be worshipped, even if some interpretations believed it had the power to bless or illuminate.

== Modern philosophy ==
Modern philosophers have presented numerous different views of ultimate reality. Some of the most common positions which have been defended in modern academic philosophy include the following:

- Monism: Monism holds that all things derive from, or are identical with, a single fundamental reality.
- Dualism: Dualists posit two irreducible categories, such as mind and matter, that cannot be reduced to each other.
- Non-Reductive Pluralism: Non-reductive pluralists instead treat multiple conceptual or ontological domains as equally real without a single unifying base.
- Physicalist Foundationalism: Physicalists claim that the physical world is the ultimate ground, and that all higher-level facts depend on it. Reductionists equate everything with the physical, while non-reductive physicalists retain dependence but reject strict identity.
- Idealist Foundationalism: Idealists hold that mind, consciousness, or mental structure is metaphysically primary. Some analytic versions adopt cosmopsychism, while continental versions continue various forms of absolute idealism, the most influential one of which was Hegel's.
- Neo-Aristotelian Substance Foundationalism: This view treats substances (fundamental entities with intrinsic unity) as the ground of all other things. Properties and events depend on substances, which form the basic ontological layer.
- Process or Event Ontology: Process metaphysics asserts that reality’s ultimate constituents are dynamic processes or events rather than static substances. What is fundamental is becoming, change, or generative activity.
- Structuralism and Relational Ontologies: Structuralists claim that relations or structures are the fundamental reality, with objects reduced to nodes or positions within those structures. Continental structuralism interprets the fundamental as systems and relations rather than substances.
- Anti-Foundationalism: Anti-foundationalists deny that there is any ultimate ground or metaphysical base at all. Apparent foundations are viewed as contingent, historically constituted, or artifacts of our conceptual schemes.
- Quietism: Quietists hold that questions about an “absolute reality” arise from misuse of language and lack determinate content. They suspend metaphysical theorizing and treat such inquiries as dissolvable rather than answerable.
- Revisionary Naturalism: Revisionary naturalists reject traditional metaphysics and treat scientific ontology as the only legitimate guide to what exists. They decline to posit any further foundational reality beyond the evolving structure of scientific theory, which is always being revised and updated.

Contemporary philosophy notes the possibility that reality has no fundamental explanation and should be seen as a brute fact. Adherents of the principle of sufficient reason reject this, holding that everything must have a reason.

== Representation ==
According to Dadosky, the concept of "ultimate reality" is difficult to express in words, poetry, mythology, and art. Paradox or contradiction is often used as a medium of expression because of the "contradictory aspect of the ultimate reality".

According to Mircea Eliade, ultimate reality can be mediated or revealed through symbols. For Eliade the "archaic" mind is constantly aware of the presence of the Sacred, and for this mind all symbols are religious (relinking to the Origin). Through symbols human beings can get an immediate "intuition" of certain features of the inexhaustible Sacred. The mind makes use of images to grasp the ultimate reality of things because reality manifests itself in contradictory ways and therefore can't be described in concepts. It is therefore the image as such, as a whole bundle of meaning, that is "true" (faithful, trustworthy). Eliade says:

the sacred is equivalent to a power, and, in the last analysis, to reality. The sacred is saturated with being. Sacred power means reality and at the same time enduringness and efficacy. The polarity sacred-profane is often expressed as opposition between real and unreal or pseudoreal. [...] Thus it is easy to understand that religious man deeply desires to be, to participate in reality, to be saturated with power.

Common symbols of ultimate reality include world trees, the tree of life, microcosm, fire, children.

The Christian philosopher Paul Tillich held that God was the ground of being and is something that precedes the subject and object dichotomy, considering it instead to be what people are ultimately concerned with, existentially, and that religious symbols can be recovered as meaningful even without faith in the personal God of traditional Christianity.

== See also ==
- Absolute (philosophy)
- Ein Sof
- I Am that I Am
- Nondualism
- Pantheism
- The One
- Wuji

== Sources ==
- John Daniel Dadosky. The Structure of Religious Knowing: Encountering the Sacred in Eliade and Lonergan. State University of New York Press, 2004. ISBN 0791460614.
- Fowler, Jeaneane D. (2002), Perspectives of Reality: An Introduction to the Philosophy of Hinduism, Sussex Academic Press, ISBN 978-1-898723-93-6
- Harvey, Peter, Buddhism, Bloomsbury Publishing
- Wedemeyer, Christian K. (2012), Making Sense of Tantric Buddhism: History, Semiology, and Transgression in the Indian Traditions, Columbia University Press
