= Monolatry =

Belief in the existence of many gods but with the consistent worship of only one deity

Monolatry (Ancient Greek: μόνος, mónos, lit. 'single', and λατρεία, latreia, 'worship') is the belief in the existence of many gods combined with the insistence on the exclusive worship of a single chosen deity. The term was possibly first used by Julius Wellhausen.

Monolatry is distinguished from monotheism, which asserts that only one god exists, and from henotheism, which accepts both the existence of other gods and the validity of their worship.

The clearest ancient example is the Atenism introduced by the pharaoh Akhenaten in the fourteenth century BCE, which elevated Aten to sole object of worship in Egyptian religion without denying that other gods existed; Egypt reverted to its traditional religion under his successors. Some scholars have also argued that the ancient Israelites practiced a form of monolatry or henotheism before the Babylonian captivity, citing passages in the Torah that acknowledge other gods, though medieval Jewish commentators read the same texts as monotheistic. In modern religion, the classification has been applied to The Church of Jesus Christ of Latter-day Saints, which teaches that the Godhead comprises three distinct beings and that other divine beings exist; the label is disputed within the church.

Mormon cosmology discusses the existence of many gods, and a method by which any human can become a god, but Mormons only worship the Godhead and ignore the other gods, as stated by the founder of the religion Joseph Smith: "Paul says there are gods many and lords many; but to us there is but one God, and one Lord".

== Atenism ==
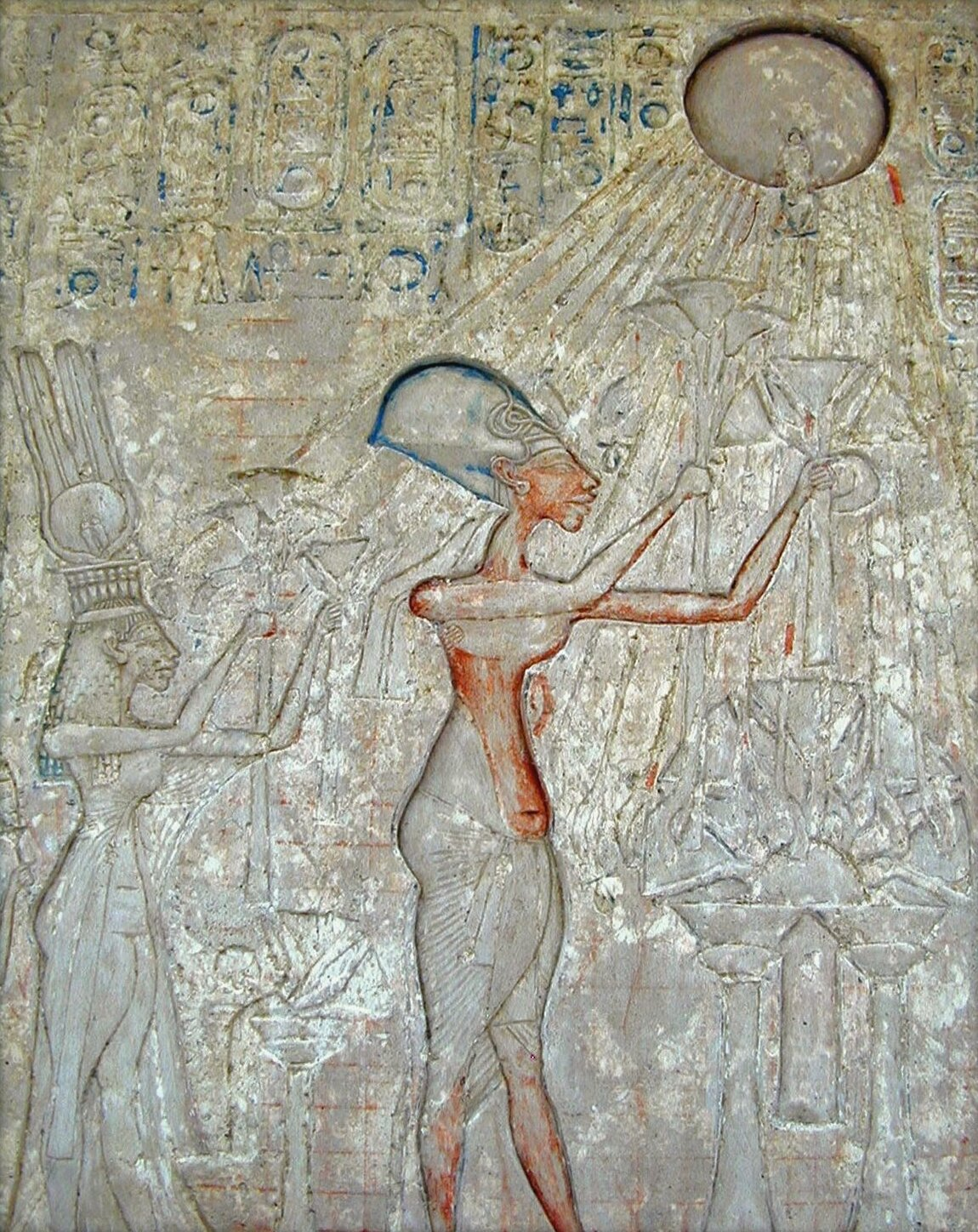
Pharaoh Akhenaten and his family adoring the Aten

The pharaoh Akhenaten, who was initially enthroned as Amenhotep IV, initially introduced Atenism in the fifth year (approximately 1348–1346 BCE) of his reign during the Eighteenth Dynasty of Egypt. He raised Aten, once a relatively obscure solar deity representing the disk of the Sun, to the status of supreme deity in ancient Egyptian religion.

The fifth year of his reign marked the beginning of his construction of a new capital, Akhetaten (Horizon of the Aten), at the site known today as "Amarna". Amenhotep IV officially changed his name to "Akhenaten" (Agreeable to the Aten) as evidence of his new worship. In addition to constructing a new capital in honor of Aten, Akhenaten also oversaw the construction of some of the most massive temple complexes of ancient Egypt, including one at Karnak and one at Thebes, close to the old temple of Amun.

In his ninth year of rule (approximately 1344–1342 BCE), Akhenaten declared a more radical version of his new religion, declaring Aten not merely the supreme god of the Egyptian pantheon but the only god of Egypt, with himself as the sole intermediary between the Aten and the Egyptian people. Key features of Atenism included a ban on idols and other images of the Aten, with the exception of a rayed solar disc in which the rays (commonly depicted ending in hands) appear to represent the unseen spirit of Aten. Aten was addressed by Akhenaten in prayers, such as the Great Hymn to the Aten.

The details of Atenist theology are still unclear. The exclusion of all but one god and the prohibition of idols was a radical departure from Egyptian tradition, but most scholars see Akhenaten as a practitioner of monolatry rather than monotheism, as he did not actively deny the existence of other gods; he simply refrained from worshiping any but Aten. It is known that Atenism did not solely attribute divinity to the Aten. Akhenaten continued the imperial cult, proclaiming himself the son of Aten and encouraging the people to worship him. The people were to worship Akhenaten; only Akhenaten and the pharaoh's wife Nefertiti could worship Aten directly.

Under Akhenaten's successors, Egypt reverted to its traditional religion, and Akhenaten himself came to be reviled as a heretic.

== In ancient Israel ==
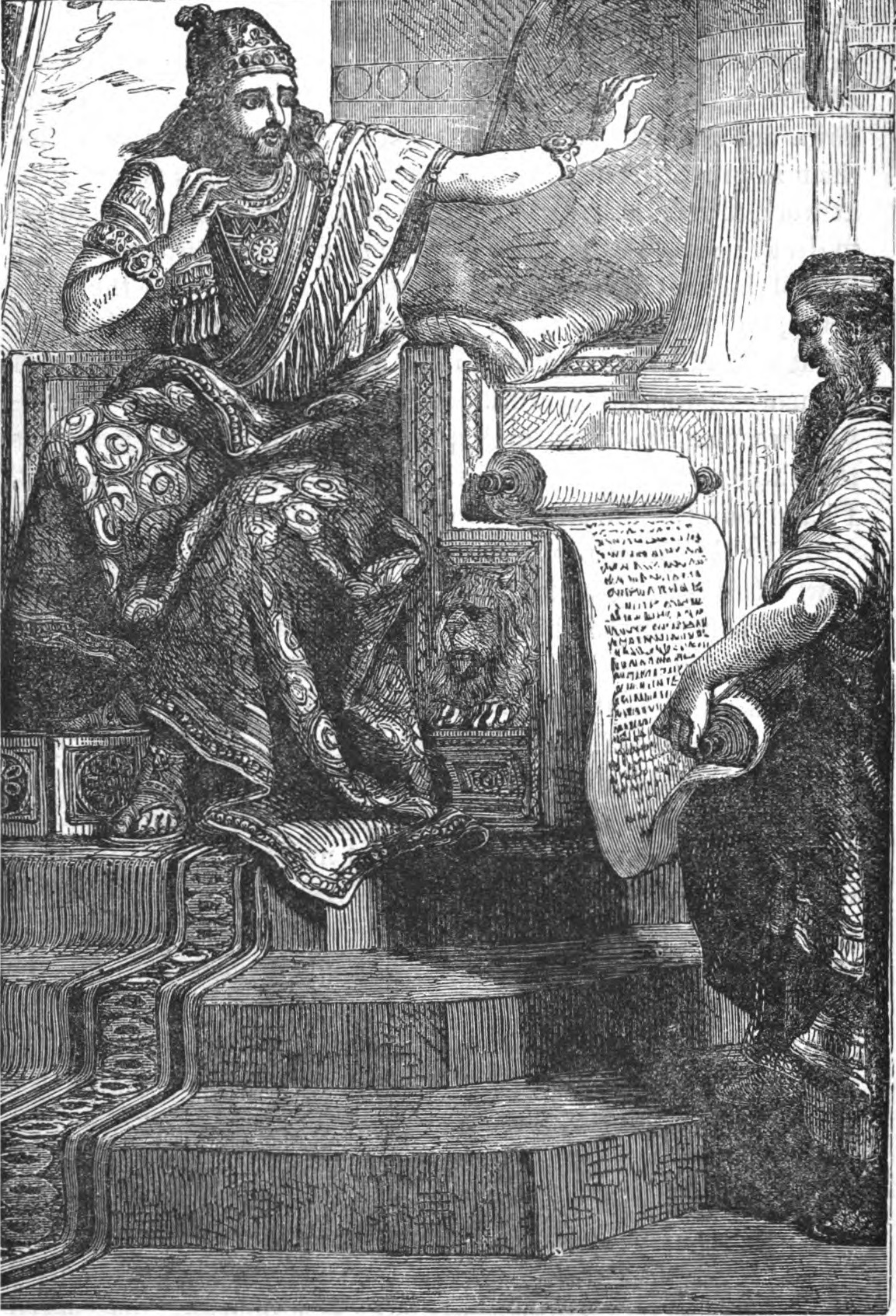
Josiah Hearing the Book of the Law (1873)

Some historians have argued that ancient Israelites originally practiced a form of monolatry or henotheism. Christian Old Testament (Hebrew Bible) scholar John Day suggests that angels in Judaism are what became of the other gods once monotheism reached predominance among the early Jews. John L. McKenzie has stated: "In the ancient Near East the existence of divine beings was universally accepted without questions. [...] The question was not whether there is only one elohim, but whether there is any elohim like Yahweh."

Some scholars claim the Torah (Pentateuch) shows evidence of monolatry in some passages. The argument is usually based on references to other gods, such as the "gods of Egypt" in the Book of Exodus (Exodus 12:12). The Egyptians are also attributed powers that suggest the existence of their gods; in Exodus 7:11–13, after Aaron transforms his staff into a snake, Pharaoh's sorcerers do likewise. In the ancient Near East, magic was generally believed to exist, although the Israelites viewed magic as being malign in origin and were forbidden from it.

The Ten Commandments have been interpreted by some as evidence that the Israelites initially practiced monolatry. Exodus 20:3 reads, "you shall have no other gods before me", and they argue that the addition of "before me" at the end of the commandment indicates not only that other gods may exist, but also that they may be respected and worshiped so long as less than Yahweh. In the creation story of Genesis (3:22), Yahweh says, "The man has now become like one of us, knowing good and evil. He must not be allowed to reach out his hand and take also from the tree of life and eat, and live forever."

There is evidence that the Israelites before the Babylonian captivity in the 6th century BCE did not adhere to monotheism. Much of this evidence comes from the Hebrew Bible itself, which records that many Israelites chose to worship foreign gods and idols rather than Yahweh.

During the 8th century BCE, the monotheistic worship of Yahweh in Israel competed with many other cults, described by the Yahwist faction collectively as Baals. The oldest books of the Hebrew Bible reflect this competition, as in the books of Hosea and Nahum, whose authors lament the "apostasy" of the people of Israel and threaten them with the wrath of God if they do not give up their polytheistic cults.

On the other hand, medieval Jewish scholars often interpreted ancient texts to argue that the ancient Israelites were monotheistic. The Shema Yisrael is often cited as proof that the Israelites practiced monotheism. It was recognized by Rashi in his 11th century commentary to Deuteronomy 6:4 that the declaration of the Shema accepts belief in one God as being only a part of Jewish faith at the time of Moses but would eventually be accepted by all humanity.

A similar statement occurs in Maimonides's second principle of his Thirteen Principles of Faith:

God, the Cause of all, is one. This does not mean one as in one of a pair, nor one like a species [which encompasses many individuals], nor one as in an object that is made up of many elements, nor as a single simple object that is infinitely divisible. Rather, God is a unity unlike any other possible unity. This is referred to in the Torah [Deuteronomy 6:4]: "Hear Israel, the Lord is our God, the Lord is one."

== The Church of Jesus Christ of Latter-day Saints ==
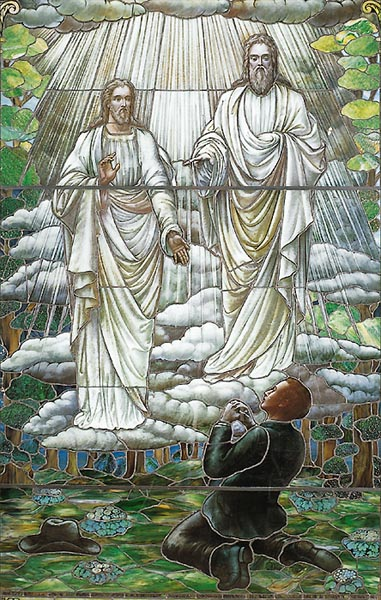
Beginning in 1838, Joseph Smith taught that he had seen two personages in the spring of 1820. In 1843, Smith taught that these personages, God the Father and Jesus, had separate, tangible bodies.

The Church of Jesus Christ of Latter-day Saints (LDS Church) teaches that God the Father, Jesus Christ and the Holy Ghost are three distinct beings belonging to one Godhead: "All three are united in their thoughts, actions, and purpose, with each having a fullness of knowledge, truth, and power." Latter-day Saints further believe that prayer should be directed to only God the Father in the name of Jesus Christ.

Jeffrey R. Holland has stated:

We believe these three divine persons constituting a single Godhead are united in purpose, in manner, in testimony, in mission. We believe Them to be filled with the same godly sense of mercy and love, justice and grace, patience, forgiveness, and redemption. I think it is accurate to say we believe They are one in every significant and eternal aspect imaginable except believing Them to be three persons combined in one substance.

Latter-day Saints interpret Jesus' prayer in John 17:11, "Holy Father, keep through thine own name those whom thou hast given me, that they may be one, as we are" to refer to the characteristics, attributes and purpose that the Son shares with the Father in the hope that people can someday share in those as well. In Mormonism, being one with God means gaining immortality, perfection, eternal life, and the highest level in his kingdom. As D. Todd Christofferson states, "we may become one with God" as Jesus did.

Latter-day Saints also believe that there are other gods and goddesses outside the Godhead, such as a Heavenly Mother—who is married to God the Father—and that faithful Latter-day Saints may attain godhood in the afterlife.

Joseph Smith taught that humans can become joint-heirs with Christ and thereby inherit from God all that Christ inherits if they are proven worthy by following the laws and ordinances of the gospel. This process of exaltation means that humans can literally become gods through the atonement; thus, "god" is a term for an inheritor of the highest kingdom of God.

To the extent that monolatry is not considered monotheism, the classification of Mormonism as monolatrous is strongly disputed among Latter-day Saints. Bruce R. McConkie stated that "if [monotheism] is properly interpreted to mean that the Father, Son, and Holy Ghost—each of whom is a separate and distinct godly personage—are one God, meaning one Godhead, then true saints are monotheists."

Monolatry began to be normalized and recognized in connection with the Latter-day Saint movement primarily by the works of Blake Ostler.
