= Kathenotheism =

Worshipping one god at once, while believing in other gods

Kathenotheism is a term coined by the philologist Max Müller to mean the worship of one god at a time. It is closely related to henotheism, the worship of one god while not rejecting the existence of other gods. Müller coined the term in reference to the Vedas, where he explained each deity is treated as supreme in turn.

== Etymology ==
Kathenotheism, a more specific form of henotheism, refers to the worship of a succession of supreme gods "one at a time", from the Greek kath' hena "one by one" + theism.

== Ancient Greece ==
The ancient Orphic religion had a polytheistic theology. The deities were each distinct individuals that were not equated with one another.

== Hinduism ==
The Smarta Tradition of Hinduism worship the five major deities as supreme in turn and collectively.
