= Absolute (philosophy) =

Philosophical or theological concept

In philosophy (often specifically metaphysics), the absolute, (Note: Hegel capitalized das Absolute because German grammar requires this of all nouns. Yet, in the words of one of Hegel's recent translators, capitalization in English has "no justification in Hegel's text and, in my view, draws an unwarranted sharp distinction between what is a technical use and what is not. Again, it should be left to the reader (or to a note) to decide this question and not imposed by the translator." Regardless, the word is sometimes capitalized in English works, whether in relation to Hegel or not.) in most common usage, is an absolute perfect, self-sufficient reality that depends upon nothing external to itself. In various religions, the term is often used to designate the supreme deity of which is said that all existence comes from. While the notion of the absolute varies across traditions and thinkers, it generally signifies something that transcends all forms of limitation, relativity, and contingency.

== Meanings ==
The term "absolute" is derived from the Latin word absolutus, meaning "set free, detached, or unrestricted." In philosophical discourse, it refers to something that is unconditioned, independent, and ultimate. It suggests a reality that is beyond all forms of relativity and remains complete in and of itself.

- Absolute as Perfection: The absolute is often conceived as a state of perfect being or existence.
- Absolute as Self-Sufficiency: It is entirely self-contained, requiring no external cause or condition.
- Absolute as Ultimate Reality: It is often equated with the ultimate ground of existence or the highest metaphysical principle.

== In religious philosophy ==
=== Indian religions ===
The concept of the Absolute has been used to interpret the early texts of the Indian religions such as those attributed to Yajnavalkya, Nagarjuna and Adi Shankara.

In Hinduism, the concept of the Absolute is most closely associated with Brahman, the ultimate, formless, and unchanging reality. Adi Shankara (Sanskrit: आदि शङ्कर) (8th century CE), the proponent of Advaita Vedanta (Sanskrit: अद्वैत वेदान्त), taught that the individual soul (Atman) (Sanskrit: आत्म) is ultimately identical with the universal Brahman (Sanskrit: ब्रह्मन्). The world of plurality is maya (Sanskrit: माया) —an illusion that veils the true, non-dual reality.

According to Takeshi Umehara, some ancient texts of Buddhism state that the "truly Absolute and the truly Free must be nothingness", the "void". Yet, the early Buddhist scholar Nagarjuna states that it does not present "emptiness" as some kind of Absolute; rather, it is "the very absence (a pure non-existence) of inherent existence" in the Mādhyamaka school of the Buddhist philosophy.

Jain philosophy introduces the idea of Anekantavada (Sanskrit: अनेकान्तवाद)(non-absolutism), which posits that no single viewpoint can capture the entirety of truth and that all statements about reality are conditional and relative.

=== Mysticism ===
In mystical traditions across cultures, the Absolute is often experienced as an ineffable, transcendental reality beyond the grasp of the human intellect. Mystics describe their encounter with the Absolute as a state of union or oneness with the divine or ultimate reality.

In Sufism, the concept of Wahdat al-Wujud (Arabic: وحدة الوجود) (the Unity of Being) proposed by Ibn Arabi suggests that all existence is ultimately one, with God being the sole reality. The world is seen as a reflection or manifestation of God, and mystical realization involves dissolving the ego to merge with the Absolute. Similarly, in Christian mysticism, figures like Meister Eckhart describe the experience of divine union where the soul becomes one with God, transcending individual existence.

In Hindu mysticism, the state of samadhi (Sanskrit: समाधिः) in yoga or the realization of nirvikalpa samadhi (Sanskrit: निर्विकल्प समाधिः) (absorption without attributes) is described as a direct encounter with Brahman, the Absolute. In Buddhist mysticism, particularly in Zen Buddhism, the experience of satori (Japanese: 悟り) or kenshō (Japanese: 見性) is considered a glimpse of the Absolute, where dualities dissolve, and the individual recognizes the true nature of reality.

== G. W. F. Hegel ==
Hegel used the term das Absolute in his German literary works. Contrary to some popular accounts, (Note: E.g., Copleston 1963, pp. 166–80.) the term is not specific to Hegel. It first occurs in the work of Nicholas of Cusa, and Hegel's own usage was developed in response to that of his contemporary Friedrich Wilhelm Joseph Schelling.

Hegel's use of "absolute" is easily misunderstood. Michael Inwood, however, clarifies: derived from the Latin absolutus, it means "not dependent on, conditional on, relative to or restricted by anything else; self-contained, perfect, complete." In the words of scholar Allegra de Laurentiis, this means that absolute knowing can only denote "an 'absolute relation' in which the ground of experience and the experiencing agent are one and the same: the object known is explicitly the subject who knows." That is, the only "thing" (which is really an activity) that is truly absolute is that which is entirely self-conditioned, and according to Hegel, this only occurs when spirit takes itself up as its own object. In some respects, this view of Hegel was anticipated by Johann Gottlieb Fichte's theory of the absolute self. The final section of Hegel's Philosophy of Spirit presents the three modes of such absolute knowing: art, religion, and philosophy. (Note: As Walter Jaeschke, German scholar and editor of the critical Gesammelte Werke edition of Hegel's works puts it, "It is only in this sphere [of absolute knowing] that spirit brings forth a shape – an image of itself, as it were – and relates itself to this shape in the forms of intuition [art], representation [religion], and comprehending thinking [philosophy/logic]. It is here that spirit relates itself to itself and is absolute precisely in its self-relation. It cognizes itself as what it is and it is with itself (bei sich) and free in this cognition. Only with this cognition is the concept of spirit – as the concept of a thinking relation to self – complete.")

For Hegel, as understood by Martin Heidegger, the absolute is "spirit, that which is present to itself in the certainty of unconditional self-knowing". As Hegel is understood by Frederick Copleston, "[l]ogic studies the absolute 'in itself'; the philosophy of nature studies the absolute 'for itself'; and the philosophy of spirit studies the absolute 'in and for itself'."

In British philosophy, F. H. Bradley distinguishes the concept of absolute from God, whereas Josiah Royce, a neo-Hegelian and founder of the American idealism school of philosophy, has equated them.

== Criticism ==
Søren Kierkegaard critiqued the concept of the Absolute from an existential perspective, arguing that absolute knowledge undermines the importance of personal faith and subjective commitment. For Kierkegaard, truth is subjectivity rather than an abstract absolute. Friedrich Nietzsche challenged the notion of an Absolute by declaring the "death of God," which symbolized the end of objective moral truths derived from a metaphysical absolute. Nietzsche emphasized the need for human beings to create their own values.

== See also ==
- Absolute idealism
- Absolute infinite
- Brahman
- Buddhahood
- Buddha-nature
- Chaos (mythology)
- Cosmos
- Eternal Buddha
- Henology
- Henosis
- Indeterminacy
- Intrinsic value
- Monad
  - Monism
- Non-absolutism
- Pantheism
- Reality in Buddhism
- Ultimate reality
- Universality (philosophy)
- Tian
- Tao
- Wusheng Laomu
