= Timeline of Christianity =

The purpose of this timeline is to give a detailed historical account of the real historical events of Christianity from the beginning of the current era (CE / AD) to the present. Question marks ('?') below on dates indicate approximate dates. Christian events include miracles and fulfilled Hebrew prophecies.

The year one is the first year in the Christian calendar (there is no year zero), which is the calendar presently used (in unison with the Gregorian calendar) almost everywhere in the world. Traditionally, this was held to be the year Jesus was born; however, most modern scholars argue for an earlier or later date, the most agreed upon being between 6 BC and 4 BC.

== Background historical timeline ==
- 6 AD Herod Archelaus deposed by Augustus; Samaria, Judea and Idumea annexed as Iudaea Province under direct Roman administration, capital at Caesarea. Quirinius became Legate (Governor) of Syria, conducted Census of Quirinius, opposed by Zealots (Luke 2:1–3, Acts 5:37)
- 7–26 Brief period of peace, relatively free of revolt and bloodshed in Judea and Galilee
- 9 Pharisee leader Hillel the Elder dies, temporary rise of Shammai
- 14–37 Tiberius, Roman Emperor
- 18–36 Caiaphas, appointed High Priest of Herod's Temple by Prefect Valerius Gratus, deposed by Syrian Legate Lucius Vitellius
- 19 Jews, Jewish proselytes, astrologers, expelled from Rome
- 26–36 Pontius Pilate, Prefect (governor) of Iudaea, recalled to Rome by Syrian Legate Vitellius on complaints of excess violence
- 28 or 29 John the Baptist begins his ministry in the "15th year of Tiberius" (Luke 3:1–2), saying: "Repent, for the kingdom of heaven is at hand!" (Matthew 3:1–2), a relative of Jesus (Luke 1:36), a Nazirite (Luke 1:15), baptized Jesus (Mark 1:4–11), later arrested and beheaded by Herod Antipas (Luke 3:19–20), it is possible that, according to the Josephus' chronology, John was not killed until 36 A.D.

== Timeline of Jesus' ministry ==
Jesus began his ministry after his baptism by John and during the rule of Pilate, preaching: "Repent, for the kingdom of heaven is near" (Matthew 4:12–17). Non-Catholic historians and the Catholic Church teaches that the gospel accounts depict historic events. While the historicity of the gospel accounts is questioned to some extent by some critical scholars and non-Christians, the traditional view states the following chronology for his ministry:

- Temptation
- Sermon on the Mount
- Appointment of the Twelve
- Miracles
- Temple Money Changers
- Last Supper
- Arrest
- Trial
- Passion
- Crucifixion on Nisan 14th (John 19:14, Mark 14:2, Gospel of Peter) or Nisan 15th (Synoptic Gospels)
- Entombment by Joseph of Arimathea and Nicodemus
- Resurrection by God and Resurrection appearances of Jesus to Mary Magdalene and other women (Mark 16:9, John 20:10–18), Simon Peter (Luke 24:34), and others (1Cor.15:3–9)
- Great Commission
- Ascension

=== Prophecies ===
Second Coming Prophecy to fulfill the rest of Messianic prophecy such as the Resurrection of the dead, the Last Judgment, and establishment of the Kingdom of God and the Messianic Age.

== Apostolic Age ==
Shortly after the death and resurrection of Jesus Christ (Nisan 14 or 15), the Jerusalem church was founded as the first Christian church with about 120 Jews and Jewish Proselytes (Acts 1:15), followed by the events of

- Pentecost (Sivan 6)
- Ananias and Sapphira incident
- Pharisee Gamaliel's defense of the Apostles (Acts 5:34–39)
- the stoning of Saint Stephen (see also Persecution of Christians) and the subsequent dispersion of the Apostles (Acts 7:54–8:8, also Mark 16:20) which leads to the baptism of Simon Magus in Samaria (Acts 8:9–24), and also an Ethiopian eunuch (Acts 8:26–40)
- Paul's "Road to Damascus" conversion to "Apostle to the Gentiles" is first recorded in Acts 9:13–16, cf. Gal 1:11–24
- Peter baptizes the Roman Centurion Cornelius, who is traditionally considered the first Gentile convert to Christianity (Acts 10)
- The Antioch church is founded, where the term Christian was first used (Acts 11:26).

Year	Date	History	Image
37–41		Crisis under Caligula is seen as the first clear conflict between Rome and the Jews.	
Before 44		Epistle of James is written by James the Great, originally in Koine Greek.	Memorial to Lajos Fülep quoting James 3:17, "But the wisdom that comes from heaven is first of all pure; then peace-loving, considerate, submissive, full of mercy and good fruit, impartial and sincere."
44?		Death of Saint James the Great - According to a medieval tradition, on 2 January 40 AD, the Virgin Mary appeared to James on a pillar on the bank of the Ebro River at Caesaraugusta, while he was preaching the Gospel in Spain. Following that vision, St. James returned to Judea, where he was beheaded by King Herod Agrippa I in the year 44 AD during a Passover. Herod then proceeded to arrest St. Peter (Nisan 15) (Acts 12:1–3).	St. James the Apostle (1612–1613)
44		The death of Herod Agrippa I (Last king of Judea) occurred when an angel of the Lord struck him down, resulting in him being eaten by worms and dying. (Acts 12:20–23)	King Herod II
44–46?		Theudas was beheaded by Procurator Cuspius Fadus for saying he would part the Jordan River (like Moses with the Red Sea or Joshua with the Jordan). After him, Judas the Galilean rose up at the time of the census and gathered followers; he also perished, and all who followed him were scattered. (Acts 5:36–37 places it before the Census of Quirinius)	
45–49?		Mission of Barnabas and Paul, (Acts 13:1–14:28) to Cyprus, Pisidian Antioch, Iconium, Lystra and Derbe (there they were called "gods ... in human form"), then return to Syrian Antioch: Map1	
47		The Church of the East is created by Saint Thomas in the Persian Empire (modern-day Iraq and Iran)	
48		Council of Jerusalem (Acts 15). Gentile Christians accepted alongside those in the Jewish tradition.	
48–100		Herod Agrippa II appointed King of the Jews by Claudius, seventh and last of the Herodians	Herod Agrippa II
49		Claudius expelled the Jews from Rome, stating, "the Jews constantly made disturbances at the instigation of Chrestus." (referenced in Acts 18:2)	Sculpture of Claudius
50		Passover riot in Jerusalem, 20,000–30,000 killed	
50?		Council of Jerusalem and the "Apostolic Decree" of Acts 15:1–35, same as Galatians 2:1–10?, which is followed by the Incident at Antioch at which Paul publicly accuses Peter of "Judaizing" (2:11–21); see also Circumcision controversy in early Christianity	
50–53?		St. Paul's 2nd mission (Acts 15:36–18:22), split with Barnabas, to Phrygia, Galatia, Macedonia, Philippi, Thessalonica, Berea, Athens, Corinth, "he had his hair cut off at Cenchrea because of a vow he had taken", then return to Antioch; 1 Thessalonians, Galatians written? Map2. Lydia of Thyatira, a seller of purple, becomes the first European Christian convert (Acts 16:11-15)	
51–52 or 52–53		Proconsulship of Gallio according to an inscription, only fixed date in chronology of Paul	
52	November 21	St. Thomas the Apostle lands in India. Establishes churches at Kodungalloor, Palayoor, Paraur, Kottakkav, Kokkamangalam, Nilakkal, Niranam and Kollam	St. Thomas the Apostle
53–57?		St. Paul's 3rd mission, (Acts 18:23–22:30), to Galatia, Phrygia, Corinth, Ephesus, Macedonia, Greece, and Jerusalem where James the Just challenges him about rumor of teaching antinomianism (21:21); he addresses a crowd in their language (most likely Aramaic); Romans, 1 Corinthians, 2 Corinthians, Philippians written? Map3	
55?		"Egyptian Prophet" (allusion to Moses) and 30,000 unarmed Jews doing The Exodus reenactment massacred by Procurator Antonius Felix, Acts 21:38)	
58?		St. Paul arrested, accused of being a revolutionary, "ringleader of the sect of the Nazarenes", teaching resurrection of the dead, imprisoned in Caesarea (Acts 23–26)	
59?		After St. Paul was shipwrecked on Malta, he was called a god. (Acts 28:6)	
60?		St. Paul in Rome was greeted by many "brothers". Three days later, he called together the Jewish leaders, who had not received any word from Judea about him but were curious about "this sect," which was spoken against everywhere. He tried to convince them from the "law and prophets", with partial success. He said the Gentiles would listen and spent two years proclaiming the Kingdom of God and teaching "the Lord Jesus Christ"(Acts 28:15–31); Epistle to Philemon written?	
60–65		The early date for the writing of the First Epistle of Peter is debated among scholars, but it is generally believed to have been written around this date. (written by Peter)	
62		James the Just is stoned to death for law transgression by High Priest Ananus ben Artanus. Popular opinion against this act resulted in Ananus being deposed by the new procurator Lucceius Albinus	St. James the Just
63–107?		Simeon, 2nd Bishop of Jerusalem, crucified under Trajan	Simeon the Apostle
64–68		after July 18 Great Fire of Rome; Nero blames and persecutes the Christians (or Chrestians), possibly the earliest mention of Christians by that name, in Rome; see also Tacitus on Jesus; Paul beheaded? (Col 1:24,Eph 3:13,2 Tim 4:6–8,1Clem 5:5-7), Peter crucified upside-down? (Jn 21:18,1 Pet 5:13,Tertullian's Prescription Against Heretics chapter XXXVI,Eusebius' Church History Book III chapter I), "...a vast multitude, were convicted, not so much of the crime of incendiarism as of hatred of the human race. And in their deaths they were made the subjects of sport; for they were wrapped in the hides of wild beasts and torn to pieces by dogs, or nailed to crosses, or set on fire, and when day declined, were burned to serve for nocturnal lights." (Annals (Tacitus) XV.44)	
64/67(?)–76/79(?)		Pope Linus succeeds Peter as Episcopus Romanus (Bishop of Rome)	
64		The Epistle to the Hebrews written by an Unknown Author	
65		The Q document, a hypothetical Greek text thought by many critical scholars to have been used in the writing of Matthew and Luke	
66–73		First Jewish–Roman War: destruction of Herod's Temple and end of Judaism according to Supersessionism; Qumran community (site of Dead Sea Scrolls found in 1947) destroyed	
70(+/–10)?		Gospel of Mark, written in Rome, by Peter's interpreter (1 Peter 5:13), The original ending of the gospel is believed to be lost, and additional endings were added around c. 400 (Mark 16)	The end of Mark 15 (excluding verse 47
70?		The Signs Gospel written, hypothetical Greek text used in the Gospel of John to prove Jesus is the Messiah	Saint John the Evangelist, Domenichino
70–100?		Additional Pauline Epistles(??)	
70-132		The Epistle of Barnabas (Apostolic Fathers)	
70–200?		The Gospel of Thomas, the Jewish-Christian Gospels: the Gospel of the Ebionites, the Gospel of the Hebrews, the Gospel of the Nazarenes	Gospel of Thomas and The Secret Book of John
72	July 3	Martyrdom of St. Thomas the Apostle at Chinnamala, Mylapore, Chennai (Tamil Nadu)	
76/79(?)–88		Pope Anacletus: first Greek Pope, who succeeds Linus as Episcopus Romanus (Bishop of Rome)	Pope Anacletus
80(+/-20)		the Didache written in Koine Greek	
80(+/-20)?		The Gospel of Matthew, based on Mark and Q, most popular in Early Christianity	Gospel of Matthew
80(+/-20)?		The Gospel of Luke, based on Mark and Q, also Acts of the Apostles by same author	Gospel of Luke
80(+/-20)?		The Pastoral Epistles written (possible post-Pauline authorship)	
88–101?		Clement, fourth Bishop of Rome: wrote Letter of the Romans to the Corinthians (Apostolic Fathers)	
90?		Council of Jamnia of Judaism (disputed); Domitian applies the Fiscus Judaicus tax even to those who merely "lived like Jews"	
90(+/-10)?		The late date for the writing of 1 Peter (associate of Peter as author)	
94		Testimonium Flavianum, disputed section of Jewish Antiquities by Josephus in Aramaic, translated to Koine Greek	
95(+/-30)?		The Gospel of John and the Epistles of John	
90		The Book of Revelation written, by John (son of Zebedee) and/or a disciple of his	
96		Nerva modifies the Fiscus Judaicus, from then on, practicing Jews must pay taxes while Christians do not	
98–117?		Ignatius, third Bishop of Antioch, fed to the lions in the Roman Colosseum, advocated the Bishop (Eph 6:1, Mag 2:1,6:1,7:1,13:2, Tr 3:1, Smy 8:1,9:1), rejected Sabbath on Saturday in favor of "The Lord's Day" (Sunday). (Mag 9.1), rejected Judaizing (Mag 10.3), first recorded use of the term catholic (Smy 8:2).	
100(+/-10)?		The Epistle of Jude was likely written by Jude, a doubting relative of Jesus (Mark 6:3). It was rejected by some early Christians due to its reference to the apocryphal Book of Enoch.	

== Ante-Nicene period ==
- 100–150? Apocryphon of James, Gospel of Mary Magdalene, Gospel of James, Infancy Gospel of Thomas, Secret Gospel of Mark (Complete Gospels, published by Jesus Seminar)
- 110–130? Papias, bishop of Hierapolis, writes "Expositions of the Sayings of the Lord", lost, widely quoted (Apostolic Fathers)
- 110 Ignatius of Antioch writes to the Smyrnaeans that the Christian church is katholikos ("universal")
- 110–160? Polycarp, bishop of Smyrna, Letter to the Philippians, (Apostolic Fathers)
- 112 Pliny reports rapid growth of Christianity in Bithynia
- 120? Rabbi Tarfon advocates burn heretical Christian writings.
- 125(+/-5)? 2 Peter written, not accepted into canon until early 400s, drew upon Epistle of Jude, "catholic" epistle, Pastoral Epistles written
- 125? Rylands Library Papyrus P52, oldest extant NT fragment, p. 1935, parts of Jn18:31-33,37-38
- 130–250? "Christian Apologists": Justin Martyr, Athenagoras, Apology of Aristides, Theophilus of Antioch, Tatian, Quadratus, Melito of Sardis, Apollinaris Claudius, Marcus Minucius Felix, Arnobius, Epistle to Diognetus
- 132–135 Bar Kokhba's revolt: final Jewish revolt. Jerusalem renamed Aelia Capitolina .
- 142–144? Marcion of Sinope: bishop according to Catholic Encyclopedia, goes to Rome, possibly to buy the bishopric of Rome, upon rejection forms his own church in Rome, later called Marcionism, rejected Old Testament, decreed canon of one Gospel, one Apostolicon (10 Letters of Paul) and one Antithesis which contrasted the Old Testament with the New Testament, cited Western text-type, see also Expounding of the Law#Antithesis of the Law
- 150? "Western Revisor" adds/subtracts from original Acts to produce Western version which is 10% larger and found in Papyrus P29,38,48 and Codex Bezae (D)
- 150 Gospel reaches Portugal and Morocco
- 150? Valentinius (most famous Christian Gnostic, according to Tertullian) narrowly loses election for Bishop of Rome
- 150(+/-10)? The Shepherd of Hermas, written in Rome (Apostolic Fathers)
- 150–200? Other Gospels: Gospel of the Saviour, Gospel of Peter, Oxyrhynchus Gospels, Dialogue of the Saviour
- 155? Montanus claims to be the Paraclete ("Counselor") of John 14:16
- 160? Martyrdom of Polycarp (Apostolic Fathers)
- 166 Bishop Soter writes that the number of Christians has surpassed the Jews
- 167 At the request of Lucius of Britain, missionaries Fuganus (or Phagan) and Duvianus (or Deruvian) were sent by Pope Eleuterus to convert the Britons to Christianity
- 170? Dionysius, bishop of Corinth claimed that some, probably Marcionites, were changing and forging their own letters just as he knew they had changed the Gospels.
- 170? Tatian produces "Diatessaron" (Harmony) by blending 4 "Western" text-type Gospels into 1
- 170? Symmachus the Ebionite writes new Greek translation of Hebrew Bible
- 174 First Christians reported in Austria
- 177 Persecution in Lyon, martyrdom of Blandina
- 180? Hegesippus
- 180–202? Irenaeus, Bishop of Lyon: combated heresies, cited "Western" Gospel text-type (Ante-Nicene Fathers); second "Primate of the Gauls"
- 185–350? Muratorian fragment, 1st extant canon for New Testament after Marcion?, written in Rome by Hippolytus?, excludes Hebrews, James, 1-2 Peter, 3 John; includes Wisdom of Solomon, Apocalypse of Peter
- 186? Saint Apollonius: used the term catholic in reference to 1 John
- 188–231 Saint Demetrius: bishop of Alexandria, condemned Origen
- 189–198 Pope Victor I: 1st Latin Pope, excommunicated Eastern churches that continued to observe Easter on Nisan 14 Quartodeciman
- 190 Pataenus of Alexandria goes to India in response to an appeal for Christian teachers
- 196? Polycrates, bishop of Ephesus (Ante-Nicene Fathers)
- 196 Bar Daisan writes of Christians among the Parthians, Bactrians (Kushans), and other peoples in the Persian Empire
- 197 Tertullian writes that Christianity had penetrated all ranks of society in North Africa
- 199–217? Caius, presbyter of Rome, wrote "Dialogue against Proclus" in Ante-Nicene Fathers, rejected Revelation, said to be by Gnostic Cerinthus; see also Alogi
- 199–217? Caius, presbyter of Rome, wrote "Dialogue against Proclus" in Ante-Nicene Fathers, rejected Revelation, said to be by Gnostic Cerinthus, see also Alogi
- 200 First Christians are reported in Switzerland and Belgium
- 200? Papyrus 46: 2nd Chester Beatty, Alexandrian text-type; Papyrus 66: 2nd Bodmer, John, 1956, "Alexandrian/Western" text-types; Papyrus 75: Bodmer 14–15, Luke & John, earliest extant Luke, ~Vaticanus; 200? Papyrus 32: J. Rylands Library: Titus 1:11-15;2:3-8; Papyrus 64 (+67): Mt3:9,15; 5:20-22,25-28; 26:7-8,10,14-15,22-23,31-33
- 200? Sextus Julius Africanus
- 200? Antipope Natalius, rival bishop of Rome, according to Eusebius's EH5.28.8-12, quoting the Little Labyrinth of Hippolytus, after being "scourged all night by the holy angels", covered in ash, dressed in sackcloth, and "after some difficulty", tearfully submitted to Pope Zephyrinus
- 202 Roman Emperor Severus issues an edict forbidding conversion to Christianity
- 206 Abgar, King of Edessa, embraces the Christian faith
- 208 Tertullian writes that Christ has followers on the far side of the Roman wall in Britain where Roman legions have not yet penetrated
- 217–236 Antipope Hippolytus, Logos sect? Later dispute settled and considered martyr, Roman canon
- 218–258 Cyprian, Bishop of Carthage.
- 220? Clement of Alexandria, cited "Alexandrian" NT text-type & Secret Gospel of Mark & Gospel of the Egyptians; wrote "Exhortations to the Greeks"; "Rich Man's Salutation"; "To the Newly Baptized"; (Ante-Nicene Fathers)
- 220?–340? Codex Tchacos, manuscript containing a copy of the Gospel of Judas, is written
- 223? Tertullian: sometimes called "father of the Latin Church", because he coined trinitas, tres Personae, una Substantia, Vetus Testamentum, Novum Testamentum, convert to Montanism, cited "Western" Gospel text-type (Ante-Nicene Fathers)
- 225? Papyrus 45: 1st Chester Beatty Papyri, Gospels (Caesarean text-type, mixed), Acts (Alexandrian text-type)
- 235–238 Maximinus Thrax: emperor of Rome, ends Christian schism in Rome by deporting Pope Pontian and Antipope Hippolytus to Sardinia, where they soon die
- 241 Mani begins to preach in Seleucia-Ctesiphon in what is now Iraq
- 248–264 Dionysius, Patriarch of Alexandria see also List of Patriarchs of Alexandria
- 250 Denis (or Denys or Dionysius) is sent from Rome along with six other missionaries to establish the church in Paris
- 250? Apostolic Constitutions, Liturgy of St James, Old Roman Symbol, Clementine literature
- 250? Letters of Methodius, Pistis Sophia, Porphyry Tyrius, Commodianus (Ante-Nicene Fathers)
- 250? Papyrus 72: Bodmer 5-11+, pub. 1959, "Alexandrian" text-type: Nativity of Mary; 3Cor; Odes of Solomon 11; Jude 1-25; Melito's Homily on Passover; Hymn fragment; Apology of Phileas; Ps33,34; 1Pt1:1-5:14; 2Pt1:1-3:18
- 250? Origen, Jesus and God one substance, adopted at First Council of Nicaea in 325, compiled Hexapla; cites Alexandrian, Caesarean text-type; Eusebius claimed Origen castrated himself for Christ due to Mt19:12 (EH6.8.1-3)
- 251–424? Synods of Carthage
- 251–258 Antipope Novatian decreed no forgiveness for sins after baptism (An antipope was an individual whose claim to the papacy was either rejected by the Church at the time or later recognized as invalid.)
- 254–257 Pope Stephen I: major schism over rebaptizing heretics and apostates
- 258 "Valerian's Massacre": Roman emperor issues edict to execute immediately all Christian Bishops, Presbyters, and Deacons, including Pope Sixtus II, Antipope Novatian, Cyprian of Carthage (CE: Valerian, Schaff's History Vol 2 Chap 2 § 22)
- 264–269 Synods of Antioch: condemned Paul of Samosata, Bishop of Antioch, founder of Adoptionism (Jesus was human until the Holy Spirit descended at his baptism), also condemned term homoousios adopted at Nicaea
- 265 Gregory Thaumaturgus (Ante-Nicene Fathers)
- 270 Death of Gregory Thaumaturgus, Christian leader in Pontus. It was said that when Gregory became "bishop" there were only 17 Christians in Pontus while at his death thirty years later there were only 17 non-Christians.
- 270? Anthony begins monastic movement
- 275? Papyrus 47: 3rd Chester Beatty, ~Sinaiticus, Rev9:10-11:3,5-16:15,17-17:2
- 276 Mani (prophet), crucified, founder of the dualistic Manichaean sect in Persia
- 280 First rural churches emerge in northern Italy; Christianity is no longer exclusively in urban areas
- 282–300? Theonas, bishop of Alexandria (Ante-Nicene Fathers)
- 287 Maurice from Egypt is killed at Agauno, Switzerland for refusing to sacrifice to pagan divinities
- 290–345? St Pachomius, founder of Christian monasticism
- 296–304 Pope Marcellinus, offered pagan sacrifices for Diocletian, later repented. Name in Martyrology of Bede
- 300 First Christians reported in Greater Khorasan; an estimated 10% of the world's population is now Christian; parts of the Bible are available in 10 different languages
- 301 – Armenia is the first kingdom in history to adopt Christianity as state religion
- 303–312 Diocletian's Massacre of Christians, includes burning of scriptures (EH 8.2)
- 303 Saint George, patron saint of Georgia, England and other states
- 304? Victorinus, bishop of Pettau
- 304? Pope Marcellinus, having repented from his previous defection, suffers martyrdom with several companions
- 306 Synod of Elvira prohibits relations between Christians and Jews
- 310 Maxentius deports Pope Eusebius and Heraclius to Sicily (relapse controversy)
- 312 Lucian of Antioch, founder of School of Antioch, martyred
- 312 Vision of Constantine: while gazing into the sun he sees a cross with the words by this sign conquer, see also Labarum, he was later called the 13th Apostle and Equal-to-apostles
- 313 Edict of Milan: Constantine and Licinius end persecution, establish toleration of Christianity
- 313? Lateran Palace given to Pope Miltiades for residence by Constantine
- 313? Traditional date for founding of the Brotherhood of the Holy Sepulchre
- 314 King Urnayr of Caucasian Albania adopts Christianity as official religion
- 314 Catholic Council of Arles, called by Constantine against Donatist schism to confirm the Council of Rome in 313
- 314–340? Eusebius, bishop of Caesarea, church historian, cited Caesarean text-type, wrote Ecclesiastical History in 325
- 317? Lactantius
- 321 Constantine decrees Sunday as state "day of rest" (CJ3.12.2), see also Sol Invictus

== First Seven Ecumenical Councils ==
Constantine called the First Council of Nicaea in 325 to unify Christology, also called the first great Christian council by Jerome, the first ecumenical, decreed the Original Nicene Creed, but rejected by Nontrinitarians such as Arius, Theonas, Secundus of Ptolemais, Eusebius of Nicomedia, and Theognis of Nicaea who were excommunicated, also addressed Easter controversy and passed 20 Canon laws such as Canon VII which granted special recognition to Jerusalem.

- 325, 20 May–19 June: The First Council of Nicaea
- 325 The Kingdom of Aksum (Modern Ethiopia and Eritrea) declares Christianity as the official state religion, becoming the 2nd country to do so
- 325 Church of the Nativity in Bethlehem, ordered built by Constantine
- 326, November 18: Pope Sylvester I consecrates the Basilica of St. Peter built by Constantine the Great over the tomb of the Apostle
- 328–373 Athanasius, bishop of Alexandria, first cite of modern 27 book New Testament canon
- 330 Old Church of the Holy Apostles, dedicated by Constantine
- 330, May 11: Constantinople solemnly inaugurated. Constantine moves the capital of the Roman Empire to Byzantium, renaming it New Rome
- 331 Constantine commissions Eusebius to deliver 50 Bibles for the Church of Constantinople
- 335 Council in Jerusalem reverses Nicaea's condemnation of Arius, consecrates Jerusalem Church of the Holy Sepulchre
- 337? Mirian III of Iberia (present-day Georgia) adopts Christianity.
- 337, May 22: Constantine the Great dies (baptized shortly prior to his death)
- 341–379 Shapur II's persecution of Persian Christians
- 343? Catholic Council of Serdica, canons confirmed by Pope Julius
- 350? Julius Firmicus Maternus
- 350? Codex Sinaiticus (א), Codex Vaticanus Graecus 1209(B): earliest Christian Bibles, Alexandrian text-type
- 350? Ulfilas, Arian, apostle to the Goths, translates Greek NT to Gothic
- 350? Comma Johanneum 1Jn5:7b-8a (KJV)
- 350? Aëtius, Arian, "Syntagmation": "God is agennetos (unbegotten)", founder of Anomoeanism
- 350? School of Nisibis founded
- 353–367 Hilary, bishop of Poitiers
- 355–365 Antipope Felix II, Arian, supported by Constantius II, consecrated by Acacius of Caesarea
- 357 Third Council of Sirmium issues so-called Blasphemy of Sirmium or Seventh Arian Confession, called high point of Arianism
- 359 Council of Rimini, Dated Creed (Acacians); Pope Liberius rejects Arian creed of council
- 360 Julian the Apostate becomes the last non-Christian Roman Emperor
- 363–364 Council of Laodicea: Canon 29 decreed anathema for Christians who rest on the Sabbath, disputed Canon 60 named 26 NT books (excluded Revelation)
- 366–367 Antipope Ursicinus, rival to Pope Damasus I
- 367–403 Epiphanius, Bishop of Salamis, wrote Panarion against heresies
- 370–379 Basil the Great, Bishop of Caesarea
- 370? Doctrine of Addai at Edessa proclaims 17 book NT canon using Diatessaron (instead of the 4 Gospels) + Acts + 15 Pauline Epistles (inc. 3 Corinthians) Syriac Orthodox Church
- 370 (d. ca.) Optatus of Milevis, who in his conflict with the sectarian Donatists stressed unity and catholicity as marks of the Church over and above holiness, and also that the sacraments derived their validity from God, not from the priest
- 372–394 Gregory, Bishop Of Nyssa
- 373 Ephrem the Syrian, cited Western Acts
- 374–397 Ambrose, governor of Milan until 374, then made Bishop of Milan
- 375–395 Ausonius, Christian governor of Gaul
- 379–381 Gregory Nazianzus, Bishop of Constantinople
- 380, February 27: Emperor Theodosius I issues the Edict of Thessalonica, declaring Nicene Christianity as the state church of the Roman Empire
- 380, November 24: Emperor Theodosius I is baptised
- 381 First Council of Constantinople, 2nd ecumenical: Jesus had true human soul, Nicene Creed of 381
- 382 Catholic Council of Rome under Pope Damasus I sets the Biblical canon, listing the inspired books of the Old Testament and the New Testament (disputed)
- 383? Frumentius, Apostle of Ethiopia
- 385 Priscillian, first heretic to be executed?
- 386 Cyril of Jerusalem: wrote compellingly of catholicity of the Church
- 390? Apollinaris, Bishop of Laodicea, believed Jesus had human body but divine spirit
- 391 Theodosian decrees outlaw most pagan rituals still practiced in Rome
- 396–430 Augustine, bishop of Hippo, considered the founder of formalized Christian theology (Nicene and Post-Nicene Fathers)
- 397? Saint Ninian evangelizes Picts in Scotland
- 398–404 John Chrysostom, Patriarch of Constantinople, see also List of Patriarchs of Constantinople, (Nicene and Post-Nicene Fathers)
- 400: Jerome's Vulgate (Latin edition and translation of the Bible) is published
- 400? Ethiopic Bible: in Ge'ez, 81 books, standard Ethiopian Orthodox Bible
- 400? Peshitta Bible in Syriac (Aramaic), Syr (p), OT + 22 NT, excludes: 2Pt, 2-3Jn, Jude, Rev; standard Syriac Orthodox Church Bible
- 406 Armenian Bible, translated by Saint Mesrop, standard Armenian Orthodox Bible
- 410, 24 August: Sack of Rome by Alaric and the Visigoths
- 412–444 Cyril, bishop of Alexandria, coined Hypostatic union
- 418–419 Antipope Eulalius, rival to Pope Boniface I
- 420 St. Jerome, Vulgate translator, Latin scholar, cited expanded ending in Mark after Mark 16:8, Pericope of the Adultress addition to John (John 7:53-8:11) (Nicene and Post-Nicene Fathers)
- 423–457 Theodoret, bishop of Cyrrhus, noted Tatian's Diatesseron in heavy use, wrote a Church History
- 431 Council of Ephesus, 3rd ecumenical: repudiated Nestorianism, decreed Mary the Mother of God, forbade any changes to Nicene Creed of 381, rejected by the Persian Church, leading to the Nestorian Schism
- 432 St Patrick begins his mission in Ireland. Almost the entire nation is Christian by the time of his death in a conversion that is both incredibly successful and largely bloodless
- 440–461 Pope Leo the Great: sometimes considered the first pope (of influence) by non-Catholics, stopped Attila the Hun at Rome, issued Tome in support of Hypostatic Union, approved Council of Chalcedon but rejected canons in 453
- 449 Second Council of Ephesus, Monophysite: Jesus was divine but not human
- 450? Codex Alexandrinus (A): Alexandrian text-type; Codex Bezae (D): Greek/Latin Gospels + Acts; Codex Washingtonianus (W): Greek Gospels; both of Western text-type
- 450? std. Aramaic Targums, Old Testament in Aramaic
- 450? Socrates Scholasticus Church History of 305-438; Sozomen Church History of 323-425
- 451 Council of Chalcedon, 4th ecumenical, declared Jesus is a Hypostatic Union: both human and divine in one (Chalcedonian Creed), rejected by Oriental Orthodoxy
- 455 Sack of Rome by the Vandals. The spoils of the Temple of Jerusalem previously taken by Titus are allegedly among the treasures taken to Carthage
- 456? Eutyches of Constantinople, Monophysite
- 465? Prosper of Aquitaine
- 476, September 4: Emperor Romulus Augustus is deposed in Rome, marked by many as the fall of the Western Roman Empire
- 484–519 Acacian schism, over Henoticon, divides Eastern (Greek) and Western (Latin) churches
- 491 Armenian Orthodox split from East (Greek) and West (Latin) churches
- 495, May 13 Vicar of Christ decreed a title of Bishop of Rome by Pope Gelasius I
- 496 Clovis I, King of the Franks, baptized
- 498–499, 501–506 Antipope Laurentius, rival of Pope Symmachus, Laurentian schism
- 500? Incense introduced in Christian church service, first plans of Vatican
- 524 Boethius, Roman Christian philosopher, wrote "Theological Tractates", Consolation of Philosophy; (Loeb Classics) (Latin)
- 525 Dionysius Exiguus defines Christian calendar (AD)
- 527 Fabius Planciades Fulgentius
- 529 Benedict of Nursia establishes his first monastery in the Abbey of Monte Cassino, Italy, where he writes the Rule of St Benedict
- 530 Antipope Dioscorus, possibly a legitimate Pope
- 535–536 Unusual climate changes recorded
- 537–555 Pope Vigilius, involved in death of Pope Silverius, conspired with Justinian and Theodora, on April 11, 548 issued Judicatum supporting Justinian's anti-Hypostatic Union, excommunicated by bishops of Carthage in 550
- 538 Byzantine general Belisarius defeats last Arian kingdom; Western Europe completely Catholic
- 541–542 Plague of Justinian
- 543 Justinian condemns Origen, disastrous earthquakes hit the world
- 544 Justinian condemns the Three Chapters of Theodore of Mopsuestia (died 428) and other writings of Hypostatic Union Christology of Council of Chalcedon
- 550 St. David converts Wales, crucifix introduced
- 553 Second Council of Constantinople, 5th ecumenical, called by Justinian
- 556–561 Pope Pelagius I, selected by Justinian, endorsed Judicatum
- 563 Columba goes to Scotland to evangelize Picts, establishes monastery at Iona
- 567 Cassiodorus
- 589 Catholic Third Council of Toledo: Reccared and the Visigoths convert from Arianism to Catholicism and Filioque clause is added to Nicene Creed of 381
- 590–604 Pope Gregory the Great, whom many consider the greatest pope ever, reforms church structure and administration and establishes Gregorian chant, Seven deadly sins
- 591–628 Theodelinda, Queen of the Lombards, began gradual conversion from Arianism to Catholicism
- 596 St. Augustine of Canterbury sent by Pope Gregory to evangelise the Jutes
- 600? Evagrius Scholasticus, Church History of AD431-594
- 604 Saxon cathedral created (by Mellitus) where St Paul's Cathedral in London now stands
- 609 Pantheon, Rome renamed Church of Santa Maria Rotonda
- 612? Bobbio monastery in northern Italy
- 613 Abbey of St. Gall in Switzerland
- 614 Khosrau II of Persia conquers Damascus, Jerusalem, takes Holy Cross of Christ
- 622 Mohammed founds Islam after fleeing to Mecca
- 624 Battle of Badr, considered beginning of Islamic Empire
- 625 Paulinus of York comes to convert Northumbria
- 628 Babai the Great, pillar of Church of the East, dies
- 628–629 Battle of Mut'ah: Heraclius recovers Cross of Christ and Jerusalem from Islam until 638
- 632 Eorpwald of East Anglia baptized under influence of Edwin of Northumbria
- 634–644 Umar, 2nd Sunni Islam Caliph: capital at Damascus, conquered Syria in 635, defeated Heraclius at Battle of Yarmuk in 636, conquered Egypt and Armenia in 639, Persia in 642
- 635 Cynegils of Wessex baptized by Bishop Birinus
- 664 Synod of Whitby unites Celtic Christianity of British Isles with Roman Catholicism
- 680–681 Third Council of Constantinople, 6th ecumenical, against Monothelites, condemned Pope Honorius I, Patriarch Sergius I of Constantinople, Heraclius' Ecthesis
- 681–686 Wilfrid converts Sussex
- 687–691 Dome of the Rock built
- 690? Old English Bible translations
- 692 Orthodox Quinisext Council, convoked by Justinian II, approved Canons of the Apostles of Apostolic Constitutions, Clerical celibacy, rejected by Pope Constantine
- 698 Fall of Carthage
- 711–718 Umayyad conquest of Hispania
- 717–718 Second Arab siege of Constantinople
- 718–1492 Reconquista: Iberian Peninsula retaken by Roman Catholic Visigoth monarchs
- 718 Saint Boniface, archbishop of Mainz; an Englishman, given commission by Pope Gregory II to evangelize the Germans
- 720? Disentis Abbey of Switzerland
- 730–787 First Iconoclasm: Byzantine Emperor Leo III bans Christian icons; Pope Gregory II excommunicates him
- 731 English Church History written by Bede
- 732 Battle of Tours stops Islam from expanding westward
- 750? Tower added to St Peter's Basilica at the front of the atrium
- 752? Donation of Constantine, granted Western Roman Empire to the Pope (later proved a forgery)
- 756 Donation of Pepin recognizes Papal States
- 781 Nestorian Stele, Daqin Pagoda, Jesus Sutras, Christianity in China
- 787 Second Council of Nicaea, 7th ecumenical: ends first Iconoclasm
- 793 Sacking of the monastery of Lindisfarne marks the beginning of Viking raids on Christendom

== Middle Ages ==
- 800 King Charlemagne of the Franks is crowned first Holy Roman Emperor of the West by Pope Leo III
- 849–865 Ansgar, Archbishop of Bremen, "Apostle of the North", began evangelisation of North Germany, Denmark, Sweden
- 855 Antipope Anastasius: Louis II, Holy Roman Emperor appoints him over Pope Benedict III but popular pressure causes withdrawal
- 863 Saint Cyril and Saint Methodius sent by the Patriarch of Constantinople to evangelise the Slavic peoples. They translate the Bible into Slavonic
- 869–870 Catholic Fourth Council of Constantinople condemns Patriarch Photius (rejected by Orthodox)
- 879–880 Orthodox Fourth Council of Constantinople restores Photius, condemns Pope Nicholas I and Filioque (rejected by Catholics)
- 897, January Cadaver Synod: Pope Stephen VI conducts trial against dead Pope Formosus, public uprising against Stephen leads to his imprisonment and strangulation
- 909 Abbey of Cluny, Benedictine monastery, founded in France
- 966 Duke Mieszko I of Poland baptised; Poland becomes a Christian country
- 984 Antipope Boniface VII, murdered Pope John XIV, alleged to have murdered Pope Benedict VI in 974
- 988? Christianization of Kievan Rus'
- 991 Archbishop Arnulf of Rheims accuses Pope John XV of being the Antichrist
- 997–998 Antipope John XVI, deposed by Pope Gregory V and his cousin Holy Roman Emperor Otto III
- 1000 or 1001 Saint Stephen of Hungary crowned; Hungary becomes a Christian country
- 1001 Byzantine emperor Basil II and Fatimid Caliph Al-Hakim bi-Amr Allah execute a treaty guaranteeing the protection of Christian pilgrimage routes in the Middle East
- 1009 Caliph Al-Hakim bi-Amr Allah destroys the Church of the Holy Sepulchre, built over the tomb of Jesus in Jerusalem, and then rebuilds it to its current state
- 1012 Antipope Gregory VI, removed by Henry II, Holy Roman Emperor
- 1030 Battle of Stiklestad, considered victory of Christianity over Norwegian paganism
- 1045 Sigfrid of Sweden, Benedictine evangelist
- 1046 Council of Sutri: Pope Sylvester III exiled, Pope Gregory VI admits to buying the papacy and resigns, Pope Benedict IX resigns, council appoints Pope Clement II
- 1054 East–West Schism split between Eastern (Orthodox Christianity) and Western (Roman Catholic) churches formalized
- 1058–1059 Antipope Benedict X, defeated in war with Pope Nicholas II and Normans
- 1061–1064 Antipope Honorius II, rival of Pope Alexander II
- 1065 Westminster Abbey consecrated
- 1073–1085 Pope Gregory VII: Investiture Controversy with Henry IV, Holy Roman Emperor, proponent of clerical celibacy, opponent of simony, concubinage, Antipope Clement III
- 1079 Stanislaus of Szczepanów, patron saint of Poland
- 1080 Hospital of Saint John the Baptist founded in Jerusalem by merchants from Amalfi and Salerno – serves as the foundation for the Knights Hospitaller
- 1082 Engelberg Abbey of Switzerland built
- 1093–1109 Anselm, Archbishop of Canterbury, writes Cur Deus Homo (Why God Became Man), a landmark exploration of the Atonement
- 1095–1291 10 Crusades, first called by Pope Urban II at Council of Clermont against Islamic Empire, to reconquer the Holy Land for Christendom
- 1098 Foundation of the reforming monastery of Cîteaux, leads to the growth of the Cistercian order
- 1101 Antipope Theodoric and Antipope Adalbert deposed by Pope Paschal II
- 1113 Knights Hospitaller confirmed by Papal bull of Pope Paschal II, listing Blessed Gerard (Gerard Thom) as founder, (a.k.a. Sovereign Order of Saint John of Jerusalem of Rhodes and of Malta, Knights of Malta, Knights of Rhodes, and Chevaliers of Malta)
- 1118 Knights Templar founded, to defend Holy Land
- 1123 Catholic First Lateran Council
- 1124 Conversion of Pomerania – first mission of Otto of Bamberg
- 1128 Holyrood Abbey in Scotland
- 1128 Conversion of Pomerania – second mission of Otto of Bamberg
- 1130 Peter of Bruys burned at the stake
- 1131 Tintern Abbey founded in Wales
- 1131–1138 Antipope Anacletus II
- 1139 Catholic Second Lateran Council
- 1140? Decretum Gratiani, Catholic Canon law
- 1142 Peter Abélard, Letters of Abelard and Heloise
- 1144 The Saint Denis Basilica of Abbot Suger is the first major building in the style of Gothic architecture
- 1154–1159 Pope Adrian IV, first (and to date only) English pope
- 1155 Theotokos of Vladimir arrives to Bogolyubovo
- 1155 Carmelites founded
- 1163 Construction begins on Notre Dame de Paris
- 1168 Conversion of Pomerania – Principality of Rugia missioned by Absalon
- 1173 Waldensians founded
- 1179 Catholic Third Lateran Council
- 1191 Teutonic Knights founded
- 1204–1261 Latin Empire of Constantinople
- 1205 Saint Francis of Assisi becomes a hermit, founding the Franciscan order of friars; renounces wealth and begins his ministry
- 1208 Start of the Albigensian Crusade against the Cathars
- 1214 Rosary is reportedly given to St. Dominic (who founded Dominican Order) by an apparition of Mary
- 1215 Catholic Fourth Lateran Council decrees special dress for Jews and Muslims, and declares Waldensians, founded by Peter Waldo, as heretics. One of the goals is the elimination of the heresy of the Cathars
- 1219 Francis of Assisi crosses enemy lines during the Fifth Crusade to speak to Sultan al-Kamil; the meeting ends with a meal. James of Vitry writes that Muslim soldiers returned Francis and another friar, Illuminato, "with signs of honor."
- 1220–1263 St Alexander Nevsky, holy patron of Russia
- 1231 Charter of the University of Paris granted by Pope Gregory IX
- 1241 Pope Gregory IX denounced as Antichrist by Eberhard II von Truchsees, Prince-Archbishop of Salzburg, at the Council of Regensburg
- 1245 Catholic First Council of Lyon
- 1252, May 15 Ad exstirpanda: Pope Innocent IV authorizes use of torture in Inquisitions
- 1260 Date at which a 1988 Vatican sponsored scientific study places the origin of the Shroud of Turin
- 1263, July 20–24 The Disputation of Barcelona is held at the royal palace of King James I of Aragon in the presence of the King, his court, and many prominent ecclesiastical dignitaries and knights, between a convert from Judaism to Christianity Dominican Friar Pablo Christiani and Rabbi Nachmanides
- 1274 Summa Theologiae, written by Thomas Aquinas, theologian and philosopher, landmark systematic theology which later becomes official Catholic doctrine
- 1274 Catholic Second Council of Lyon
- 1291 Last Crusader city (Acre) falls to the Mamelukes

== Renaissance ==
- 1308–1321 The Divine Comedy (Divina Commedia) is written in the Tuscan dialect by Dante Alighieri; The most commonly accepted dates for its composition are: Inferno, written between 1307 and 1308; Purgatorio, from 1307–1308 to 1313–1314; and Paradiso, from 1313–1314 to 1321 (the year of Dante's death). The epic poem is divided into three parts, each representing a journey through Hell, Purgatory, and Heaven
- 1307 The arrest of many of the Knights Templar, beginning confiscation of their property and extraction of confessions under torture
- 1305–1378 Avignon Papacy, Popes reside in Avignon, France
- 1311–1312 Catholic Council of Vienne disbands Knights Templar
- 1314 Jacques de Molay, last Grandmaster of the Knights Templar, burned at the stake
- 1326 Metropolitan Peter moves his see from Kiev to Moscow
- 1341–1351 Orthodox Fifth Council of Constantinople
- 1342 Marsilius of Padua
- 1345 Sergii Radonezhskii founds a hermitage in the woods, which grows into the Troitse-Sergiyeva Lavra
- 1378–1418 Western Schism in Roman Catholicism
- 1380–1382 Wycliffe's Bible, by John Wycliffe, an eminent theologian at Oxford, NT in 1380, OT (with the help of Nicholas of Hereford) in 1382, translated the New Testament into Middle English, creating the first and complete English translation of the bible. The book included the deuterocanonical books and was marked by his criticisms of church abuses, anti-catholic views of the sacraments (Penance and Eucharist), the use of relics, and clerical celibacy. These views ultimately led to his excommunication by the church, and in 1428, long after his death, his remains were exhumed and burned as a heretic.
- 1388 Twenty-five Articles of the Lollards published
- 1408 Council of Oxford forbids translations of the Scriptures into the vernacular, unless and until they are fully approved by church authority
- 1409 Council of Pisa declares Roman Pope Gregory XII and Avignon Pope Benedict XIII deposed, elected Pope Alexander V (called the Pisan Pope)
- 1414–1418 Catholic Council of Constance asks Gregory XII, Benedict XIII, Pisan Pope John XXIII to resign their papal claims, then elects Pope Martin V; condemns John Wycliffe and Jan Hus, who is burned at the stake
- 1423–1424 Council of Siena
- 1425 Catholic University of Leuven
- 1430? Andrei Rublev, the greatest of medieval icon-painters
- 1431 St. Joan of Arc, French national heroine, burned at the stake
- 1431–1445 Catholic Council of Basel-Ferrara-Florence
- 1439 Notre-Dame de Strasbourg, highest building in the world until 1874
- 1452 Dum Diversas, papal bull issued on 18 June 1452, credited with ushering in the West African slave trade in Europe and the New World
- 1453 Fall of Constantinople, overrun by Ottoman Empire
- 1455 Gutenberg Bible, first printed Bible, by Johann Gutenberg
- 1473–1481 Sistine Chapel built
- 1478 Spanish Inquisition established by Pope Sixtus IV
- 1483 Martin Luther born in Eisleben
- 1484 December 5, Summis desiderantes against Witchcraft issued by Pope Innocent VIII
- 1487 Persecution and crusade against the Waldensians instigated by Pope Innocent VIII
- 1492 Columbus opens new continents to Christianity
- 1498 Girolamo Savonarola, Dominican priest, writes Bonfire of the Vanities
- 1506 Pope Julius II orders the Old St. Peter's Basilica torn down and authorizes Donato Bramante to plan a new structure (demolition completed in 1606); Vatican Swiss Guard founded
- 1508–1512 Michelangelo frescoes the Sistine Chapel's vaulted ceiling
- 1510s A number of theologians in the Holy Roman Empire start to preach reformational ideas shortly before Martin Luther, including Christoph Schappeler in Memmingen (1513), but fail to spark a larger movement
- 1512–1517 Catholic Fifth Council of the Lateran: condemned Conciliarism

== Reformation ==
- 1517 The Ninety-five Theses of Martin Luther, nailed to the door of the Castle Church in Wittenberg, marked the beginning of the Reformation and the establishment of Lutheranism
- 1518 Heidelberg Disputation: Martin Luther puts forth his Theology of the Cross
- 1519 Leipzig Debate between Martin Luther and Johann Eck
- 1519 Huldrych Zwingli begins the Reformed tradition, sparking the Reformation in Switzerland
- 1520 Luther publishes three monumental works, To the Christian Nobility of the German Nation, On the Babylonian Captivity of the Church, and On the Freedom of a Christian
- 1521 Luther refuses to recant his works at the Diet of Worms
- 1521 Papal bull Decet Romanum Pontificem (It Pleases the Roman Pontiff) excommunicates Luther
- 1521 Ferdinand Magellan claims the Philippines for Spain, first mass and subsequent conversion to Catholicism, first in East Asia
- 1522 Luther translated the Bible by himself, producing the German New Testament translation also known as the Luther Bible.
- 1524 The Freedom of the Will published by Erasmus
- 1525 On the Bondage of the Will published by Luther in response to Erasmus
- 1525 Anabaptist movement begins
- 1526 Tyndale's NT, English NT translation from 1516 Greek text of Erasmus, first printed edition, reflects influence of Luther's NT in rejecting priest for elder, church for congregation, banned in 1546 by Henry VIII of England
- 1526 Luther publishes his German Mass and The Sacrament of the Body and Blood of Christ—Against the Fanatics, his first written work against the Sacramentarians
- 1528 Reformation in Denmark-Norway and Holstein, Lutheranism is officially adopted
- 1528 Luther affirms the real presence of Christ's body and blood in his Confession Concerning Christ's Supper
- 1529 Marburg Colloquy, Luther defends doctrine of Real Presence in discussion with Zwingli
- 1530 Augsburg Confession, first doctrinal statement of the Lutheran Church
- 1531 Huldrych Zwingli is killed during the Second War of Kappel
- 1531 Our Lady of Guadalupe in Mexico: According to tradition, when the roses fell from it the icon of the Virgin of Guadalupe appeared imprinted on the cactus cloth. The sudden, extraordinary success of the evangelizing of ten million Indians in the decade of 1531–1541.
- 1534 Henry VIII establishes new independent entity Church of England, see also English Reformation
- 1535–1537 Myles Coverdale's Bible, used Tyndale's NT along with Latin and German versions, included Apocrypha at the end of the OT (like Luther's Bible of 1534) as was done in later English versions, 1537 edition received royal licence, but banned in 1546 by Henry VIII
- 1535 Thomas More refuses to accept King Henry VIII's claim to be the supreme head of the Church in England, and is executed
- 1535–1679 Forty Martyrs of England and Wales
- 1536 Desiderius Erasmus, eminent Dutch humanist and editor of the Textus Receptus, dies
- 1536 Tyndale put to death, left his OT translation in manuscript, English ecclesiastical authorities ordered his Bible burned because it was thought to be part of Lutheran reform
- 1536 Institutes of the Christian Religion written by John Calvin (Calvinism)
- 1536 John of Leiden, fanatic Dutch Anabaptist
- 1536 Jacob Hutter, founder of Hutterites
- 1536 Helvetic Confessions of the Reformed Churches of Switzerland
- 1536–1540 Dissolution of the Monasteries in England, Wales and Ireland
- 1536 Pilgrimage of Grace
- 1536–1541 Michelangelo paints "The Last Judgement"
- 1537 Christian III of Denmark decreed Lutheranism state religion of Norway and Denmark
- 1537 Luther writes Smalcald Articles
- 1537–1551 Matthew Bible, by John Rogers, based on Tyndale and Coverdale received royal licence but not authorized for use in public worship, numerous editions, 1551 edition contained offensive notes (based on Tyndale)
- 1539–1569 Great Bible, by Thomas Cromwell, 1st English Bible to be authorized for public use in English churches, defective in many places, based on last Tyndale's NT of 1534–1535, corrected by a Latin version of the Hebrew OT, Latin Bible of Erasmus, and Complutensian Polyglot, last edition 1569, never denounced by England
- 1540 Jesuit order founded by Ignatius of Loyola, helped reconvert large areas of Poland, Hungary, and south Germany and sent missionaries to the New World, India, and China
- 1541 John Calvin returns to Geneva
- 1542 Roman Inquisition established by Pope Paul III
- 1542 Robert Bellarmine born – became a Cardinal Inquisitor under Pope Clement VIII
- 1543 Parliament of England bans Tyndale's translation as a "crafty, false and untrue translation"
- 1545–1563 Catholic Council of Trent: Counter-Reformation against Protestantism, clearly defined an official theology and biblical canon
- 1549 Original Book of Common Prayer of the Church of England written by Thomas Cranmer
- 1551 The Stoglav Church Council (One Hundred Chapters) Moscow, Russia
- 1552 Joachim Westphal starts controversy against Calvinists, defending Lutheran doctrine of Real Presence
- 1552 Francis Xavier, Jesuit missionary, "Apostle of the Indies"
- 1553 Pontifical Gregorian University founded at Vatican City
- 1553 Michael Servetus founder of Unitarianism, burned at the stake in Geneva
- 1553–1558 Queen Mary I of England persecutes reformers: John Rogers, Hugh Latimer, Nicholas Ridley, Thomas Cranmer; of 238 burned at the stake
- 1555 Peace of Augsburg gives religious freedom in Germany only to Lutheran Protestants
- 1558 Church of England permanently reestablished after Mary I of England dies
- 1559 Military Order of the Golden Spur founded by Pope Paul IV
- 1560 Geneva Bible, NT a revision of Matthew's version of Tyndale with use of Theodore Beza's NT (1556), OT a thorough revision of Great Bible, appointed to be read in Scotland (but not England), at least 140 editions, first Bible with chapter and verse numbers
- 1560 Scots Confession, Church of Scotland, Scottish Reformation
- 1560–1598 French Wars of Religion
- 1560–1812 Goa Inquisition, persecution of Hindus and Jews in India, see also Christianity in India
- 1561 Menno Simons, founder of Mennonites
- 1563 Thirty-Nine Articles of Church of England, also decreed Biblical canon
- 1563 Heidelberg Catechism of Reformed churches
- 1565-73 Examination of the Council of Trent by Martin Chemnitz
- 1566 Roman Catechism and Index of Prohibited Books published
- 1569 Metropolitan Philip of Moscow strangled by Malyuta Skuratov
- 1570 Pope Pius V issued a bull Quo primum; He standardised the Holy Mass by promulgating the 1570 edition of the Roman Missal.
- 1571 Dutch Reformed Church established
- 1571 Battle of Lepanto saves Christian Europe; Pope Pius V organizes the Holy League led by Don Juan de Austria to defend Europe from the larger Islamic Ottoman forces (230 galleys and 56 galliots)
- 1572 John Knox founds Scottish Presbyterian Church, due to disagreement with Lutherans over sacraments and church government
- 1572–1606 Bishops' Bible, a revision of the Great Bible checked against the Hebrew text, 1st to be published in England by episcopal authority
- 1572 St. Bartholomew's Day Massacre: Thousands of Protestants murdered in France
- 1577 Formula of Concord adopted by German Lutherans
- 1579 Discovery of the holiest Russian icon, Our Lady of Kazan
- 1580 Book of Concord of Lutheranism published
- 1582 St Teresa of Avila dies
- 1582 Gregorian calendar of Pope Gregory XIII adopted at different times in different regions of the world
- 1582 Rheims New Testament published – it later became part of the 1610 Douay–Rheims Bible
- 1585 Jesuit scholar Francisco Ribera publishes first futurist interpretation, of the Biblical books of Daniel and Revelation
- 1587 Toyotomi Hideyoshi expels Jesuits from Kyūshū
- 1587? Mission Nombre De Dios in St. Augustine, Florida, considered first Catholic mission to North America
- 1588 Spanish Armada defeated in its efforts to reconquer England for Catholicism
- 1589 Metropolitan Jove is elected the first Patriarch of Moscow
- 1590 Michelangelo's dome in St Peter's Basilica completed
- 1591 St John of the Cross
- 1592 The Clementine Vulgate of Pope Clement VIII, replaced the Sistine Vulgate of 1590, the standard Latin Catholic Bible until the Second Vatican Council
- 1596 Ukrainian Catholic Church forms when Ukrainian subjects of the king of Poland are reunited with Rome's, largest Byzantine Catholic Church
- 1598 Edict of Nantes grants toleration to French Protestants (Huguenots)
- 1600 Giordano Bruno, Dominican priest, burned at the stake

== 17th century ==
- 1604 Fausto Paolo Sozzini Socinianism
- 1606 Carlo Maderno redesigns St Peter's Basilica into a Latin cross
- 1607 Jamestown, Virginia founded
- 1608 Quebec City founded by Samuel de Champlain
- 1609 Baptist Church founded by John Smyth, due to objections to infant baptism and demands for church-state separation
- 1609–1610 Douay–Rheims Bible, 1st Catholic English translation, OT published in two volumes, based on an unofficial Louvain text corrected by Sistine Vulgate, NT is Rheims text of 1582
- 1611 King James Version (Authorised Version) is published, based primarily on Tyndale's work and Bishop's Bible of 1572, first printings included separate Apocrypha between the testaments
- 1614 Fama Fraternitatis, the first Rosicrucian manifesto (may have been in circulation ca. 1610) presenting "The Fraternity of the Rose Cross"
- 1615 Confessio Fraternitatis, the second Rosicrucian manifesto describing the "Most Honorable Order" as Christian
- 1616 Chemical Wedding of Christian Rosenkreutz, the third Rosicrucian manifesto (an hermetic allegory presenting alchemical and Christian elements)
- 1618–1648 Thirty Years' War
- 1620 Plymouth Colony founded by Puritans
- 1622–1642 Armand Jean du Plessis, Cardinal Richelieu
- 1630 City upon a Hill, sermon by John Winthrop
- 1634–1637 Confessio catholica by Lutheran theologian Johann Gerhard
- 1635 Roger Williams banished from Massachusetts Bay Colony, for advocating separation of church and state
- 1636 Founding of what was later known as Harvard University as a training school for ministers – the first of thousands of institutions of Christian higher education founded in the USA
- 1636–1638 Cornelius Jansen, bishop of Ypres, founder of Jansenism
- 1637–1638 Shimabara Rebellion
- 1638 Anne Hutchinson banished as a heretic from Massachusetts
- 1641 John Cotton, advocate of theonomy, helps to establish the social constitution of the Massachusetts Bay Colony
- 1642, 15 September – 27 October: Synod of Iași at Iași
- 1643 Acta Sanctorum
- 1643 John Campanius arrives in New Sweden
- 1644 Rhode Island founded by Roger Williams as first colony to establish complete religious liberty
- 1644 Long Parliament directs that only Hebrew canon be read in the Church of England (effectively removing the Apocrypha)
- 1646 Westminster Standards produced by the Assembly, one of the first and undoubtedly the most important and lasting religious document drafted after the reconvention of the Parliament, also decrees Biblical canon
- 1648 George Fox founds the Quaker movement
- 1648 Treaty of Westphalia ends Thirty Years' War, extends religious toleration to Calvinists
- 1650 Bishop James Ussher calculates date of creation as October 23, 4004 BC
- 1653–1656 Raskol of the Russian Orthodox Church
- 1653 Coonan Cross Oath at Mattancherry by Malankara Church
- 1655–1677, Abraham Calovius publishes Systema Iocorum theologicorum, height of Lutheran scholasticism
- 1660–1685 King Charles II of England, restoration of monarchy, continuing through James II, reversed decision of Long Parliament of 1644, reinstating the Apocrypha, reversal not heeded by non-conformists
- 1666 Paul Gerhardt, Lutheran pastor and hymnwriter, is removed from his position as a pastor in Nikolaikirche in Berlin, when he refuses to accept "syncretistic" edict of the Elector Friedrich Wilhelm I of Brandenburg
- 1672 Greek Orthodox Synod of Jerusalem: decreed Biblical canon
- 1675 Philipp Jakob Spener publishes Pia Desideria, which becomes a manifesto for Pietism
- 1678 John Bunyan publishes Pilgrim's Progress
- 1682 Avvakum, leader of the Old Believers, burned at the stake in the Far North of Russia
- 1683 Roger Williams, advocate of Separation of church and state, founder of Providence, Rhode Island, dies
- 1683 Battle of Vienna between Ottoman Empire and Habsburg Holy Roman Empire, with Christian coalition victory resulting in final defeat of Ottoman expansion into Europe
- 1685 Edict of Fontainebleau outlaws Protestantism in France
- 1685 James II of England baptizes his son as a Catholic
- 1685 Orthodoxy introduced to Beijing by Russian Orthodox Church
- 1688 'Glorious Revolution' overthrows James II of England over fears of Catholic restoration; William of Orange takes English throne
- 1689 English Bill of Rights establishes religious liberty
- 1692 Salem witch trials held in Colonial America
- 1692–1721 Chinese Rites controversy
- 1693 Jakob Amman founds Amish sect

== 18th century ==
- 1701 Old Catholic Church of the Netherlands splits with Roman Catholicism
- 1706 Bartholomäus Ziegenbalg, missionary, arrives in Tranquebar
- 1707 Examen theologicum acroamaticum by David Hollatz: the last great Lutheran doctrinal work before the Age of Enlightenment
- 1718–1722 Orthodox Lutheran Valentin Ernst Löscher publishes The Complete Timotheus Verinus against Pietism
- 1721 Peter the Great substitutes Moscow Patriarchate with the Holy Synod
- 1722 Hans Egede, missionary, arrives in Greenland
- 1728 The Vicar of Bray (song)
- 1730–1749 First Great Awakening in U.S.
- 1735 Welsh Methodist revival
- 1738 Methodist movement, led by John Wesley and his hymn-writing brother Charles, begins
- 1740 Johann Phillip Fabricius, missionary, arrives in South India
- 1741 Sinners in the Hands of an Angry God, famous Fire and brimstone sermon
- 1741 George Frederick Handel performs his classic gospel oratorio "Messiah" for the first time
- 1754 An Historical Account of Two Notable Corruptions of Scripture, by Isaac Newton, published
- 1767–1815 Suppression of the Jesuits
- 1768 New Smyrna, Florida, Greek Orthodox colony, founded
- 1768 Reimarus dies without publishing his radical critic work distinguishing Historical Jesus versus Christ of Faith
- 1769 Mission San Diego de Alcalá, first California mission
- 1771 Emanuel Swedenborg publishes his "Universal Theology of the True Christian Religion", later used by others to found Swedenborgianism
- 1774 Ann Lee, leader of American Shakers, emigrates to New York from England
- 1774 Gotthold Ephraim Lessing starts publishing Reimarus' works on historical Jesus as Anonymous Fragments, starting Liberal Theology Era (in Christology)
- 1776–1788 Gibbon's The History of the Decline and Fall of the Roman Empire, critical of Christianity
- 1776 Mission Dolores, San Francisco
- 1779 Virginia Statute for Religious Freedom: "Jesus never coerced anyone to follow him, and the imposition of a religion by government officials is impious"
- 1780 Robert Raikes begins Sunday schools to reach poor and uneducated children in England
- 1784 American Methodists form Methodist Episcopal Church at so-called "Christmas Conference", led by bishops Thomas Coke and Francis Asbury
- 1784 Roman Catholicism is introduced in Korea
- 1789–1815 John Carroll, Archdiocese of Baltimore, first Roman Catholic US bishop
- 1789–1801 Dechristianisation of France during the French Revolution
- 1791 First Amendment to the United States Constitution: "Congress shall make no law respecting an establishment of religion, or prohibiting the free exercise thereof"
- 1793 Herman of Alaska brings Orthodoxy to Alaska
- 1795 The Age of Reason, written by Thomas Paine, advocates Deism
- 1796 Treaty with Tripoli (1796), article 11: "the Government of the United States of America is not, in any sense, founded on the Christian religion"
- 1800 Friedrich Schleiermacher publishes his first book, beginning Liberal Christianity movement

== 19th century ==
- 1801 Cane Ridge Revival in Cane Ridge, Kentucky initiates the Christians (Stone Movement) wing of the Restoration Movement
- 1809 Disciples of Christ (Campbell Movement) wing of the Restoration Movement initiated with the publication of the Declaration and Address of the Christian Association of Washington
- 1815 Peter the Aleut, orthodox Christian, tortured and martyred in Catholic San Francisco, California
- 1816 Bishop Richard Allen, a former slave, founds the African Methodist Episcopal Church, the first African-American denomination
- 1817 Claus Harms publishes 95 theses against rationalism and the Prussian Union of churches
- 1819 Thomas Jefferson produces the Jefferson Bible
- 1820, Spring: Joseph Smith Jr., founder of the Latter Day Saint movement, has his First Vision
- 1824 English translation of Wilhelm Gesenius' ...Handwörterbuch...: Hebrew-English Lexicon, Hendrickson Publishers
- 1827 Ernst Wilhelm Hengstenberg takes on the editorship of the Evangelische Kirchenzeitung, the chief literary organ of the Neo-Lutheranism
- 1828 Plymouth Brethren founded; promotes Dispensationalism
- 1830 Catherine Laboure receives Miraculous Medal from the Blessed Mother in Paris, France
- 1830 Charles Finney's revivals lead to Second Great Awakening in America
- 1830, April 6 the Church of Christ (Latter Day Saints) founded by Joseph Smith. Book of Mormon also published
- 1831 William Miller begins the Advent Movement, by preaching his first sermon on the Biblical books of Daniel and Revelation
- 1832 Christians (Stone Movement) and Disciples of Christ (Campbell Movement) merge to form the Stone-Campbell Restoration Movement
- 1832, February 28: Persecution of Old Lutherans: by a royal decree all Lutheran worship is declared illegal in Prussia in favour of the Prussian Union agenda
- 1833 John Keble's sermon "National Apostasy" initiates the Oxford Movement in England
- 1834, Charles Spurgeon born in Essex England
- 1838–1839 Saxon Lutherans objecting to theological rationalism emigrate from Germany to the United States; settle in Perry County, Missouri. Leads to formation of the Lutheran Church–Missouri Synod
- 1843 Disruption of: schism within the established Church of Scotland
- 1844 Hans Paludan Smith Schreuder, missionary, arrives in Port Natal, South Africa
- 1844 Lars Levi Laestadius experiences awakening—beginning of Laestadianism
- 1844, June 27, Joseph Smith Jr., founder of the Church of Jesus Christ of Latter Day Saints, murdered at Carthage, Illinois
- 1844, October 22 Great Disappointment: false prediction of Second Coming of Christ by Millerites
- 1844, December Ellen G. White, co-founder and prophetess of the Seventh-day Adventist Church, has her first vision
- 1845 Southern Baptist Convention formed in Augusta, Georgia
- 1846 Our Lady of La Salette
- 1847 Lutheran Church–Missouri Synod founded in Chicago, Illinois
- 1847 John Christian Frederick Heyer, missionary, arrives in Andhra Pradesh, India
- 1848 Epistle to the Easterners and Encyclical of the Eastern Patriarchs response
- 1848 Oneida Community founded by John Humphrey Noyes in western New York state
- 1849 Johann Konrad Wilhelm Löhe founds the first deaconess house in Neuendettelsau, Bavaria
- 1850 Wisconsin Evangelical Lutheran Synod founded in Milwaukee
- 1853 Synod of the Norwegian Evangelical Lutheran Church in America founded outside Madison, Wisconsin
- 1854 Missionary Hudson Taylor arrives in China
- 1854 Immaculate Conception defined as Catholic dogma
- 1855 Søren Kierkegaard, founder of Christian existentialism
- 1855 Samuel Simon Schmucker begins attempt to replace the Augsburg Confession with the Definite Platform in the General Synod, leading to schism in 1866
- 1858 Bernadette Soubirous receives the first of 18 apparitions of Our Lady of Lourdes in Lourdes, France.
- 1859 Ashbel Green Simonton, missionary, arrives in Brazil and founds Igreja Presbiteriana do Brasil, the oldest Brazilian Protestant denomination
- 1863 Seventh-day Adventist Church officially formed 19 years after the Great Disappointment
- 1865 Methodist preacher William Booth founds the Salvation Army, vowing to bring the gospel into the streets to the most desperate and needy
- 1866 General Council (Lutheran) formed by ten Lutheran synods in the United States
- 1869–1870 Catholic First Vatican Council asserts doctrine of Papal Infallibility (rejected by Christian Catholic Church of Switzerland)
- 1870 Italy declares war on the Papal States; Italian Army enters Rome; Papal States cease to exist
- 1871 Pontmain, France is saved from advancing German troops with the appearing of Our Lady of Hope
- 1871–1878 German Kulturkampf against Roman Catholicism
- 1872 Evangelical Lutheran Synodical Conference of North America organized
- 1876 Evangelical Lutheran Free Church (Germany) founded
- 1878 First translation of the New Testament into Batak by Ludwig Ingwer Nommensen
- 1879 Knock, Ireland is location of apparition of Our Lady, Queen of Ireland
- 1879 Church of Christ, Scientist founded in Boston by Mary Baker Eddy
- 1881–1894 Revised Version, called for by Church of England, uses Greek based on Septuagint (B) and (S), Hebrew Masoretic Text used in OT, follows Greek order of words, greater accuracy than AV, includes Apocrypha, scholarship never disputed
- 1884 Charles Taze Russell founds Bible Student movement
- 1885–1887 Uganda Martyrs
- 1885 Baltimore Catechism published
- 1886 Moody Bible Institute founded
- 1886 Onesimos Nesib begins translation of the entire Bible into the Oromo language
- 1886 Johann Flierl, missionary, arrives in New Guinea
- 1893 Heresy trial of Luther Alexander Gotwald
- 1894 The Kingdom of God is Within You, by Leo Tolstoy, start of Christian anarchism
- 1897 Christian flag conceived in Brooklyn, New York
- 1899 Gideons International founded
- 1900 Eastern Orthodoxy is introduced in Korea

== 20th century ==
- 1902 Geevarghese Gregorios of Parumala, Indian Orthodox Church dies
- 1902 The proclamation of the Philippine Independent Church
- 1903 First group baptism at Sattelberg Mission Station under Christian Keyser in New Guinea paves way for mass conversions during the following years
- 1904 Welsh revival
- 1904 Evangelical Lutheran Church of Brazil – Igreja Evangélica Luterana do Brasil – is founded on June 24 in São Pedro do Sul city, State Rio Grande do Sul
- 1905 French law on the separation of Church and State
- 1906 Albert Schweitzer publishes The Quest of the Historical Jesus (English translation 1910)
- 1906 Biblia Hebraica
- 1906–1909 Azusa Street Revival in Los Angeles, California begins modern Pentecostal movement
- 1907 The Church of God in Christ is formed as a Pentecostal body
- 1907–1912 Nicholas of Japan, Archbishop of Japanese Orthodox Church
- 1908 Church of the Nazarene founded in Pilot Point, Texas
- 1909 Scofield Reference Bible published
- 1909–1911 The Rosicrucian Fellowship, an international association of Esoteric Christian mystics, founded at Mount Ecclesia
- 1910 Christian Congregation in Brazil founded in Santo Antônio da Platina, Brazil by Italo-American Louis Francescon. It begins Pentecostalism in Brazil and South America
- 1910 Edinburgh Missionary Conference launches modern missions movement and modern ecumenical movement; 5-point statement of the Presbyterian General Assembly also used by Fundamentalists
- 1910–1915 The Fundamentals, a 12-volume collection of essays by 64 British and American scholars and preachers, forms foundation of Fundamentalism
- 1912 Re-establishment of Catholicate of the East of Indian Orthodox Church in Kerala, India. Baselios Paulose II as the Catholicose of the East.
- 1913 Catholic Encyclopedia
- 1914 Welsh Church Act 1914
- 1914 Iglesia ni Cristo incorporated in the Philippines by its founder Felix Y. Manalo
- 1914 Paul Olaf Bodding completes his translation of the Bible into the Santali language
- 1915 Ellen G. White, co-founder and prophetess of the Seventh-day Adventist Church, dies
- 1915–1923 The Armenian genocide occurs
- 1916 Father Divine founds International Peace Mission movement
- 1916 And did those feet in ancient time
- 1917 Heinrich Hansen publishes Lutheran Evangelical Catholic theses Stimuli et Clavi
- 1917 Our Lady of Fatima appears Marian apparitions to 3 young people, in Fátima, Portugal – Jacinta Marto, Francisco Marto and Lúcia Santos ("Sister Lucia")
- 1917, 13 October: Miracle of the Sun is witnessed by as many as 100,000 people in the Cova da Iria fields near Fátima, Portugal ("How the Sun Danced at Midday at Fátima")
- 1917 Restitution of the Moscow Patriarchy with Tikhon as patriarch
- 1917 True Jesus Church founded in Beijing
- 1918 Execution of Holy Martyrs of Russia, including the last tsar, Nicholas II, and his wife, Alexandra Feodorovna, by the Communists
- 1918 United Lutheran Church in America founded
- 1919 Karl Barth's Commentary on Romans is published, critiquing Liberal Christianity and beginning the neo-orthodox movement
- 1920 The Ecclesia, an Esoteric Christian Temple, is erected and dedicated on Christmas Day (December 25)
- 1921 Oxford Group founded at Oxford
- 1922 Greek Orthodox Archdiocese of America founded
- 1922 The Holy Bible Containing the Old and New Testaments, a New Translation by James Moffatt published
- 1923 Aimee Semple McPherson builds Angelus Temple
- 1924 First religious radio station in the U.S., KFUO (AM), founded
- 1925 Scopes Trial
- 1925 United Church of Canada formed
- 1925 St. Therese of Lisieux canonized
- 1925 The World Conference of Life and Work is held in Stockholm, Sweden
- 1926 Father Charles Coughlin's first radio broadcast
- 1926–1929 Cristero War in Mexico: The Constitution of 1917 brings persecution of Christian practices and anti-clerical laws – approximately 4,000 Catholic priests are expelled, assassinated or executed
- 1927 Varghese Payyappilly Palakkappilly founds the Congregation of Sisters of the Destitute
- 1927 Pope Pius XI decrees Comma Johanneum open to dispute
- 1929 Lateran Treaty signed, containing three agreements between kingdom of Italy and the papacy
- 1929 Varghese Payyappilly Palakkappilly dies
- 1929 Voice of Prophecy radio ministry founded by Seventh-day Adventist pastor H.M.S. Richards Sr.
- 1930 Rastafari movement founded
- 1930 Old American Lutheran Church founded
- 1930 The Lutheran Hour begins with Walter A. Maier as speaker
- 1931 Jehovah's Witnesses formally separate from the Bible Student movement
- 1931 Christ the Redeemer (statue) built in Rio de Janeiro, Brazil
- 1932 Franz Pieper's A Brief Statement of the Doctrinal Position of the Missouri Synod adopted by the LCMS
- 1932 Marian apparitions to five school children in Beauraing, Belgium as Lady Virgin of the Poor
- 1933 Catholic Worker Movement founded
- 1933 The Holy Bible from Ancient Eastern Manuscripts by George Lamsa published
- 1934 Herbert W. Armstrong founds Radio Church of God
- 1935 Gunnar Rosendal publishes Lutheran High Church manifesto Kyrklig förnyelse
- 1935 Dr. Frank C. Laubach, known as "The Apostle to the Illiterates", working in the Philippines, develops a literacy program that continues to teach millions of people to read
- 1935 Alfred Rahlf's critical edition of the Koine Greek Septuagint published
- 1935 Billy Sunday, early U.S. radio evangelist, dies
- 1938 First Debbarma Christian, Manindra Debbarma, is baptized at Agartala
- 1938 Tripura Baptist Christian Union established at Laxmilunga, Tripura
- 1939 R.C. Sproul born in Pittsburgh, Pennsylvania
- 1939 Southern and Northern US branches of the Methodist Episcopal Church, along with the Methodist Protestant Church, reunite to form The Methodist Church (slavery had divided the church in the 19th century)
- 1940 Monumento Nacional de Santa Cruz del Valle de los Caidos, world's largest cross, 152.4 meters high
- 1942 National Association of Evangelicals founded
- 1945 On the Feast of the Annunciation, "Our Lady" appears to a simple woman, Ida Peerdeman, in Amsterdam. This is the first of 56 appearances as "Our Lady of All Nations", which took place between 1945 and 1959.
- 1945 Dietrich Bonhoeffer is executed by the Nazis
- 1945 Ludwig Müller
- 1945 The Nag Hammadi library is discovered
- 1946–1952 Revised Standard Version, revision of AV "based on consonantal Hebrew text" for OT and best available texts for NT, done in response to changes in English usage
- 1947 Uneasy Conscience of Modern Fundamentalism by Carl F. H. Henry, a landmark of Evangelicalism versus Fundamentalism in US
- 1947 Oral Roberts founds the Evangelistic Association
- 1947 Dead Sea Scrolls discovered
- 1947 Lutheran World Federation founded
- 1948 World Council of Churches is founded
- 1948 Declaration of the Establishment of the State of Israel, see also Christian Zionism
- 1949 Evangelist Billy Graham preaches his first Los Angeles crusade
- 1949, October 2: Saint John Evangelical Lutheran Community – Comunidade Evangélica Luterana São João da Igreja Evangélica Luterana do Brasil – is founded in Passo Fundo, Rio Grande do Sul
- 1950 First part of the Common Confession between the American Lutheran Church and the Lutheran Church–Missouri Synod is adopted, resulting in the schism of the Orthodox Lutheran Conference
- 1950 New World Translation of the Christian Greek Scriptures released
- 1950 Assumption of Mary decreed by Pope Pius XII
- 1950 Missionaries of Charity founded by Mother Teresa
- 1951 Bishop Fulton Sheen (1919–1979) debuts his television program Life is Worth Living on the DuMont Network, a half hour lecture program on Roman Catholic theology that remained the number one show on U.S. television for its time slot, winning several Emmys until Sheen ended the program in 1957
- 1951 The Last Temptation of Christ, a fictional account of the life of Jesus written by Nikos Kazantzakis, wherein Christ's divinity is juxtaposed with his humanity, is published, and promptly banned in many countries
- 1951 Campus Crusade for Christ founded at UCLA
- 1952 Novum Testamentum Graece, critical edition of Greek NT, basis of modern translations, published
- 1952 C. S. Lewis' Mere Christianity published
- 1954 Unification Church founded by Reverend Sun Myung Moon, under the name Holy Spirit Association for the Unification of World Christianity (acronym HSA-UWC)
- 1956 Anchor Bible Series
- 1956 The Ten Commandments (1956 film)
- 1956 It Is Written television ministry founded by Seventh-day Adventist pastor George Vandeman
- 1957 United Church of Christ founded by ecumenical union of Congregationalists and Evangelical & Reformed, representing Calvinists and Lutherans
- 1957 English translation of Walter Bauer's Wörterbuch ...: A Greek-English Lexicon of the New Testament and Other Early Christian Literature, University of Chicago Press
- 1958 Sedevacantism, the belief that the office of the pope is vacant, begins with the death of Pope Pius XII
- 1959 Family Radio founded by Harold Camping
- 1959 Franz Pieper's A Brief Statement of the Doctrinal Position of the Missouri Synod reaffirmed by the LCMS
- 1960 Merger creates the "new" American Lutheran Church
- 1960 John F. Kennedy becomes the first Roman Catholic to be elected President of the United States
- 1961 New World Translation of the Holy Scriptures published
- 1961 Christian Broadcasting Network founded by Pat Robertson
- 1962 Engel v. Vitale, first U.S. Supreme Court decision against School prayer
- 1962 Karl Rahner, Joseph Ratzinger, Yves Congar, John Courtney Murray, Hans Küng among others appointed "periti" for upcoming Second Vatican Council. Rahner famous for paraphrasing Augustine's axiom: "Many whom God has the Church does not have; and many whom the Church has, God does not have."
- 1962–1965 Catholic Second Vatican Council, announced by Pope John XXIII in 1959, produces 16 documents which become official Roman Catholic teaching after approval by the Pope, purpose to renew "ourselves and the flocks committed to us"
- 1963 Martin Luther King Jr. leads a civil rights march in Washington, D.C.
- 1963 A campaign by atheist Madalyn Murray O'Hair results in U.S. Supreme Court ruling prohibiting reading of Bible in public schools
- 1963 Oral Roberts University founded
- 1963 Evangelical Lutheran Synodical Conference of North America dissolves in schism
- 1963 New Testament of Beck's American Translation completed, thousands of copies distributed through The Lutheran Hour
- 1965 Reginald H. Fuller's The Foundations of New Testament Christology
- 1965 Rousas John Rushdoony founds Chalcedon Foundation
- 1965 Nostra aetate declaration promulgated at Vatican II that repudiates the charge of deicide against Jews
- 1966 Roman Catholic Index of Prohibited Books abolished
- 1966 Raymond E. Brown's Commentary on the Gospel of John
- 1967 Lutheran Council in the United States of America organized
- 1968 In Zeitoun, Egypt, a bright image of the Virgin Mary as Our Lady of Zeitoun was seen over the Coptic Orthodox Church of Saint Demiana for over a 3-year period.
- 1968 United Methodist Church formed with union of Methodist Church and Evangelical United Brethren Church, becoming the largest Methodist/Wesleyan church in the world
- 1968 Troy Perry established the first congregation of what later became the Metropolitan Community Church, first denomination formed for LGBT people
- 1970s The Jesus movement begins in the U.S.
- 1970 Mass of Paul VI replaces Tridentine Mass
- 1970 The Late, Great Planet Earth, futurist book by Hal Lindsey, published
- 1970? Chick Publications founded
- 1971 New American Standard Bible published
- 1971 Liberty University founded by Jerry Falwell
- 1972 Most Lutheran free churches in Germany merge, forming the Independent Evangelical-Lutheran Church
- 1972, William Johnson becomes first openly gay man ordained by the United Church of Christ
- 1973, June 12: Near the city of Akita, received a Marian apparition known as Our Lady of Akita in which three messages were given to her over a period 5 months
- 1973 Trinity Broadcasting Network founded by Paul and Jan Crouch
- 1973 New International Version of the Bible is first published (revised in 1978, 1984), using a variety of Greek texts, Masoretic Hebrew texts, and current English style
- 1973 Walkout at Concordia Seminary begins the Seminex controversy in the Lutheran Church–Missouri Synod
- 1974 Jim Bakker founds PTL television ministry
- 1975 Bruce Metzger's Textual Commentary on the Greek New Testament published
- 1976 Anneliese Michel, Bavarian woman, undergoes exorcism against demon possession
- 1976 Suicide by self-immolation of East German pastor Oskar Brüsewitz, leads to mass protests against communism
- 1977 New Perspective on Paul movement begun with E. P. Sanders' 1977 work Paul and Palestinian Judaism.
- 1977 Focus on the Family founded by James Dobson
- 1978 Chicago Statement on Biblical Inerrancy issued
- 1978–2005 Pope John Paul II: reaffirmed moral traditions (The Splendor of Truth)
- 1979 Nova Vulgata replaces Clementine Vulgate
- 1979 Moral Majority founded by Jerry Falwell
- 1979 Jesus (1979 film), most watched movie of all time according to New York Times
- 1979–1982? New King James Version, complete revision of the 1611 Authorized (King James) Version, updates archaisms while retaining style
- 1980 Glacier View Conference: Seventh-day Adventist pastor and professor Desmond Ford is defrocked for questioning the sanctuary doctrine of the church, in a 1979 lecture at Pacific Union College
- 1981 Kibeho, Rwanda, reported that "Our Lady" appeared to several teenagers telling them to pray to avoid "rivers of blood" (Marian apparitions)
- 1981 Mother Angelica launches EWTN; it grows to become one of the largest television networks in the world; the operation expands to radio in 1992
- 1981 Institute on Religion and Democracy is founded
- 1981 Pope John Paul II shot by Mehmet Ali Agca; survives and later forgives him
- 1982 Chicago Statement on Biblical Hermeneutics
- 1985 Jesus Seminar founded
- 1985 E. P. Sanders' Jesus and Judaism published
- 1986 Chicago Statement on Biblical Application
- 1986 Dutch Remonstrant Brotherhood becomes the first Protestant church worldwide to approve same-sex marriage.
- 1986 Desmond Tutu becomes Anglican Archbishop of South Africa; joins anti-apartheid movement
- 1987 Danvers Statement – Council on Biblical Manhood and Womanhood
- 1988 Evangelical Lutheran Church in America founded
- 1988 Lutheran Council in the United States of America dissolved
- 1988 Christian Coalition founded by Pat Robertson
- 1988 The Last Temptation of Christ, directed by Martin Scorsese, is released by Universal Pictures, and promptly attacked as heretical by organized Christian and Catholic groups
- 1988 The celebration of 1,000 years since the baptism of Kievan Rus throughout the R.O.C.
- 1988 Assemblies of God pastor Jimmy Swaggart caught in sex scandal
- 1989 New Revised Standard Version
- 1991 John P. Meier's series A Marginal Jew: Rethinking the Historical Jesus, v. 1
- 1992 New Catechism of the Catholic Church published
- 1993 Confessional Evangelical Lutheran Conference founded
- 1993 International Lutheran Council founded
- 1994 "Evangelicals & Catholics Together"
- 1994 Porvoo Communion
- 1994 Answers In Genesis founded by Ken Ham
- 1994, July 3: Glorification of St. John of Shanghai and San Francisco
- 1996 Cambridge Declaration – Alliance of Confessing Evangelicals
- 1997 The first Passion conferences takes place founded by Pastor Louis Giglio and his wife Shelley
- 1997, March 5–10: World Council of Churches: Towards a Common Date for Easter, see also Reform of the date of Easter
- 1999 International House of Prayer in Kansas City begins non-stop 24/7 continual prayer
- 1999, October 31: signing of the Joint Declaration on the Doctrine of Justification between the Lutheran World Federation and the Catholic Church
- 1999 Gospel of Jesus Christ – An Evangelical Celebration; a consensus Gospel endorsed by various evangelical leaders including J.I. Packer, John Ankerberg, Jerry Falwell, Thomas C. Oden, R.C. Sproul, Wayne Grudem, Charles Swindoll, et al.
- 1999 Radical orthodoxy Christian theological movement begins, critiquing modern secularism and emphasizing the return to traditional doctrine; similar to the Paleo-orthodoxy Christian theological movement of the late 20th and early 21st centuries, which sees the consensual understanding of the faith among the Church Fathers as the basis of Biblical interpretation and the foundation of the Church
- 2000 Lutheran Congregations in Mission for Christ founded in schism from Evangelical Lutheran Church in America (ELCA) over fellowship with the Episcopal Church
- 2000 Visions of the Virgin Mary are reported in Assiut, Upper Egypt; phenomena associated to Mary is reported again in 2006, in a church at the same location during the Divine Liturgy. Local Coptic priests and then the Coptic Orthodox Church of Assiut issue statements in 2000 and 2006 respectively

== 21st century ==
- 2001 Armenia marks 1,700th anniversary of Christianity as its state religion (First country to adopt Christianity as its state religion – Kingdom of Armenia – 301 AD)
- 2003 Mission Province is established in Church of Sweden: heralding a new era for confessional Lutheranism in Scandinavia
- 2003 – Publication of Back To Jerusalem Called to Complete the Great Commission
- 2003 – Coptic priest Fr. Zakaria Botros begins his television and internet mission to Muslims, resulting in thousands of conversions
- 2005 Death of Pope John Paul II, election of Pope Benedict XVI
- 2005 United Church of Christ becomes first Protestant denomination to support same-sex marriage in the U.S., and one of the first denominations worldwide to do so
- 2006 Legion of Christ begins to rapidly decline following the disgrace of its founder Marcial Maciel
- 2006 World Methodist Council votes unanimously to adopt the Joint Declaration on the Doctrine of Justification
- 2006 Abdul Rahman, an Afghan Christian convert, is forced out of Afghanistan by local Muslim leaders and exiled to Italy
- 2006 Jerusalem Declaration on Christian Zionism, signed by several Christian denominations in the Middle East, criticizes the doctrine as associating the Gospel with imperialism and militarism
- 2007 American Association of Lutheran Churches and LCMS declare pulpit and altar fellowship
- 2007, May 17: Russian Orthodox Church is reunified after 80 years of schism with Russian Orthodox Church Outside Russia, a formerly True Orthodox sect that officially became semi-Autonomous
- 2007 Pope Benedict XVI issues his motu proprio Summorum Pontificum, which liberalized the use of the traditional Latin Mass
- 2008 Conservative Anglicans indicate plans to split from liberal Anglicans in "The Jerusalem Declaration"
- 2009 Damien of Molokai canonized; apostle to lepers
- 2009, August 21: Minneapolis Churchwide Assembly of the ELCA passes four ministry policy resolutions that permit clergy in committed homosexual partnerships to be rostered leaders within the ELCA
- 2009 Mar Varghese Payyappilly Palakkappilly declared Servant of God
- 2009 Manhattan Declaration: A Call of Christian Conscience is issued, signed by over 150 American religious leaders
- 2009 Anglican Church in North America is founded by former Episcopalian churches
- 2009 Pope Benedict XVI issues apostolic constitution Anglicanorum coetibus, establishing personal ordinariates for Anglican Use Catholics
- 2010 Lutheran CORE creates North American Lutheran Church in schism from the ELCA
- 2010, October 31: Attack on Baghdad church results in 52 deaths
- 2011, January 1: A church in Alexandria, Egypt, is bombed, killing 21 people, mostly Christians
- 2011 Martyrdom of Shahbaz Bhatti, Pakistani politician, the only Christian elected member of the National Assembly, and outspoken critic of Pakistan's blasphemy laws
- 2012: ECO: A Covenant Order of Evangelical Presbyterians established by former members of the Presbyterian Church (USA)
- 2013, March: Pope Francis, an Argentinean, becomes the first non-European pope in modern times, first pope from the Jesuit order, the first pope from the Americas, and the first pope from the Southern Hemisphere
- 2014 No Mass is said in Mosul for the first time in 1,600 years due to the city's fall to ISIL
- 2015: Catholicos Karekin II canonizes 1.5 million Armenians killed in Armenian genocide as martyrs
- 2015 Coptic Martyrs in Libya
- 2016, June 19 – June 26: The Pan-Orthodox Council at Crete
- 2016: Four cardinals issue dubia, asking Pope Francis to clarify his statements on divorced and civilly remarried couples receiving Holy Communion
- 2018: Archbishop Carlo Maria Viganò accuses Pope Francis of removing sanctions placed on then-Cardinal Theodore McCarrick
- 2018: Pope Francis signs agreement allowing Chinese Communist Party to appoint bishops while crackdown on Chinese Catholics continues
- 2018, early October: Ecumenical Patriarchate of Constantinople decides to grant autocephaly to the Orthodox Church of Ukraine on January 6, 2019. See Autocephaly of the Orthodox Church of Ukraine
- 2018, October 15: Russian Orthodox Church announces break in relations with the Ecumenical Patriarchate of Constantinople over objections of communion with the formerly noncanonical Ukrainian Orthodox Churches
- 2018, December 15: Unification council merges former Ukrainian Orthodox Churches of UOC-KP, UAOC, and parts of UOC-MP into the unified Ukrainian Orthodox Church
- 2020, March: Public masses suspended in cities around the world due to COVID-19 pandemic
- 2021, July 12: Baselios Marthoma Paulose II (Catholicose of the East and Malankara Metropolitan) Supreme Head of the Indian Orthodox Church, dies
- 2025, May: Pope Leo XIV, an American, becomes the first pope from North America, first pope from Peru, and first pope from the Order of Saint Augustine

== See also ==
- Books of the Bible
- Christ myth theory
- Chronology of the Bible
- Great Church
- History of ancient Israel and Judah
- Timeline of Christian missions
- Timeline of the Catholic Church

== Sources ==
- Academic American Encyclopedia (on Compuserve)
- Catholic Encyclopedia: Biblical Chronology
- English Versions of the Bible by John Berchmans Dockery O.F.M.
- Webster's New Collegiate Dictionary
- World Almanac and Book of Facts
