= Epistula Apostolorum =

Work of New Testament apocrypha

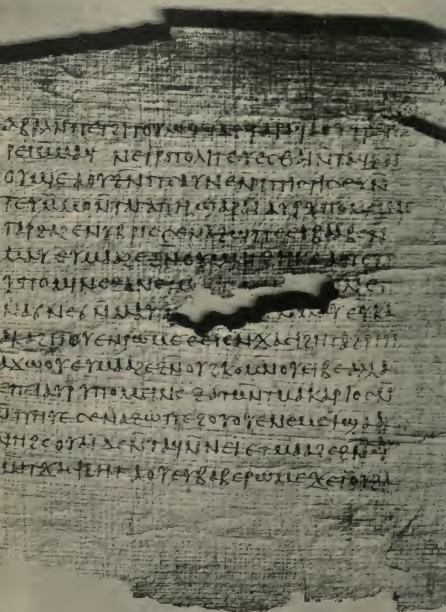
A damaged Coptic language manuscript of the Epistle of the Apostles

The Epistle of the Apostles (Latin: Epistula Apostolorum) is a work of New Testament apocrypha. Despite its name, it is more a gospel or an apocalypse than an epistle. The work takes the form of an open letter purportedly from the remaining eleven apostles describing key events of the life of Jesus, followed by a dialogue between the resurrected Jesus and the apostles where Jesus reveals apocalyptic secrets of reality and the future. It is 51 chapters long. The epistle was likely written in the 2nd century CE in Koine Greek, but was lost for many centuries. A partial Coptic language manuscript was discovered in 1895, a more complete Ethiopic language manuscript was published in 1913, and a full Coptic-Ethiopic-German edition was published in 1919.

The work's intent is to uphold early orthodox Christian doctrine, refuting Gnosticism and docetism. The teachings of the Gnostics Cerinthus and Simon Magus are denounced as false. In the debate on the nature of Jesus's existence in the 2nd century, the Epistle of the Apostles firmly advocates that the incarnation of Jesus was of flesh and blood, and that the future resurrection in the Kingdom of God would also be a fleshly experience. The work is presented as having been written shortly after the Resurrection of Jesus, and offers predictions of the coming of Paul of Tarsus, the fall of Jerusalem, and of the Second Coming happening imminently in the 2nd century CE.

== History ==
The text is commonly dated to the 2nd century, perhaps towards the first half of it. Charles E. Hill dates the Epistle to "just before 120, or in the 140s". Francis Watson dates it to around 170, after the Antonine plague, due to the references to death and disease as a sign of the end times. The work does not seem to assume a sharply differentiated or rigid church hierarchy, treats both gentile and Jewish Christians as part of the same group, and expects a 2nd-century return of Jesus: all signs of a 2nd-century origin. Most scholars favor an origin of Roman Egypt; other possibilities include Asia Minor and Roman Syria. (Note: The argument for Egyptian origin is that the work survived in Egypt, the work has an anti-Gnostic orientation, and Gnosticism seems to have been the most prominent in Egypt. There are also similarities with other dialogue gospels seemingly popular in Egypt. C. D. G. Müller is an example supporter. For a Syrian origin, scholars such as Jacques-Noël Pérès suggest there are parallels with Syrian works such as the Anaphora of Addai and Mari, and the document identified a new Jerusalem with Roman Syria. For an origin in Asia Minor (modern Turkey), Charles E. Hill argues that the depictions of disasters and inclement weather such as earthquakes, drought, persecution, rain, and hail match better with Asia Minor than Egypt.) It was probably originally composed in Koine Greek.

No surviving ancient Christian writings seem to refer to it, suggesting its circulation was limited. The work was lost to most of the world; copies were still produced and maintained in certain Ethiopian monasteries as late as the 16th century, but it was a minor and obscure work there and completely unknown elsewhere. In 1895, major portions of it were discovered in the Coptic language from a 4th–5th century manuscript by Carl Schmidt, a German Coptologist. In 1910, the English scholar M. R. James spotted similarities between the initial Coptic translations provided by Schmidt and various translations of unclassified Ethiopic documents; he realized that the Ethiopic manuscripts were likely from the same work as the Coptic manuscript. This Ethiopic language version also was more complete, including sections that were too damaged to read in the Coptic manuscripts. A French-Ethiopic edition was published in 1913, and a combined German-Coptic-Ethiopic work was published by Schmidt in 1919. The fragmentary Coptic manuscript is believed to be translated directly from the original Greek. The Ethiopic was also probably directly translated from Greek, although some have proposed it was translated from a Coptic or Arabic version instead. M. R. James also identified that one leaf of a Latin palimpsest, dating to the 5th century, was derived from the same text.

The original title of the work, if any, is unknown. The 1913 French-Ethiopic edition called it the Le Testament en Galilée de Notre-Seigneur Jésus-Christ (The Testament in Galilee of Our Lord Jesus Christ), but the name did not catch on. Schmidt used the Latin Epistola Apostolorum to name the text (with an 'o' rather than a 'u'), despite the work not having a strong affinity for Latin; that title has proven more popular in later works, and it is frequently translated into whatever language the author is using (Epistle of the Apostles, L'Épître des apôtres, etc.).

== Content ==
The text is initially framed as an open letter from the 11 apostles after Jesus's resurrection but before his ascension, but it rapidly sheds this structure, and the work as a whole cannot be accurately described as an epistle. Rather, the work becomes a gospel that describes the life and miracles of Jesus, then becomes an apocalypse where the risen Christ tells of revelations of hidden truths in response to questions from the disciples. The first 10 chapters begin by describing the nativity, resurrection, and miracles of Jesus. The remainder of the text recounts a vision and dialog between Jesus and the apostles, consisting of about sixty questions, and 41 short chapters. It closes with a brief account of the Ascension of Jesus.

The text itself appears to be based on parts of the New Testament, in particular the Gospel of John, as well as the Apocalypse of Peter, Epistle of Barnabas, and Shepherd of Hermas, all of which were considered inspired by various groups or individuals during periods of the early church.

=== Countering Gnosticism ===
The text presents Cerinthus as a chief opponent of the apostles, although it does not directly describe his doctrines. "Simon" (probably Simon Magus) is also mentioned. Some later Christian writers indicated that Cerinthus was a Gnostic, although others accused him of other heterodox beliefs.

Regardless of the author's knowledge of Cerinthus or his beliefs, the content seems to heavily criticize Gnosticism. In particular, the text uses the style of a discourse and series of questions with a vision of Jesus that was popular among Gnostic groups, wherein the apparition of Jesus would reveal new secret teachings propounded by the Gnostics. Examples of this genre (sometimes called a "Dialogue Gospel") within Gnosticism include the Gospel of Mary, the Apocryphon of John, the Sophia of Jesus Christ, and the Pistis Sophia. However, the Epistle of the Apostles repurposes this genre to use against Gnosticism, where the resurrected Jesus affirms early orthodox Christian belief on the nature of his flesh and the coming resurrection. The text also affirms that it is not a secret teaching (it is "written (...) for the whole world") and its content applies universally rather than to one group and that everyone can easily come to learn its content, contradicting the esoteric mysteries popular in Gnosticism.

The Parable of the Ten Virgins is repurposed to more directly address Gnosticism in the Epistle of the Apostles. The apostles ask which of the virgins were wise and which were foolish; Jesus replies by saying that "The five wise are Faith and Love and Grace, Peace, and Hope" while the virgins who are shut out of the wedding are named "Knowledge (Gnosis) and Wisdom (Sophia), Obedience, Forbearance, and Mercy." (Coptic version) Jesus then goes on to predict that the false Christians who fell asleep "will remain outside the kingdom and the fold of the shepherd and his sheep" and will be devoured by wolves. In other words, Gnostics will not be granted entrance into the Kingdom of God.

Carl Schmidt, the scholar who rediscovered the work, believed that the work was more intended to shore up the faith of non-Gnostics against conversion to Gnosticism than attack Gnosticism directly. Later scholars have generally not agreed with such a distinction, as the method by which the work confirms early Catholic views was precisely by refuting Gnosticism.

A dissenting view is offered by Francis Watson, who argues that the work does not have an anti-heretical or anti-Gnostic agenda. In this view, Simon Magus and Cerinthus are simply archetypical villains who could serve as fictional antagonists-within-the-Church to any Christian story of the era, and the writer may well have not known any specifics of Gnosticism or Gnostic doctrines. Similarly, while there are predictions of false teachers who follow evil and desire glory, this could be a condemnation of anyone who denied the doctrines found in the Epistula Apostolorum, not merely Gnostics. And while it is clear that the work displays a strong emphasis on the importance of the flesh, this may have merely been an independent area of theological interest to the author and to 2nd-century Christianity and not necessarily an implication that there were rival docetists denying the flesh that the author was denouncing.

Regardless of whether the targets were Gnostics or not, the work includes passages that make clear that simply being a Christian is insufficient for salvation. Various passages threaten severe punishment on Christians who diverge from Jesus's teachings or possess great wealth.

=== On the flesh ===
The Epistle of the Apostles includes polemics emphasizing the physical nature of the resurrection. This is presumably to counter docetism, the doctrine that Jesus had been a purely divine being separate from the corrupt mortal world common among Gnosticism, seen in works such as the Book of Thomas the Contender. The work does use a Gnostic-style construction of Jesus's descent through the heavens to Earth, but quickly affirms that he "became flesh" (Chapters 13–14). The resurrected Jesus has the apostles place their fingers in the print of the nails, in the spear wound in his side, and checking for footprints; this is to "prove" that the future resurrection will be a fleshly and physical one. The story of the footprints is also in direct contradiction to a story in the docetic Acts of John where the disciples realize that Jesus does not leave any footprints.

=== Predictions ===
The Epistle of the Apostles makes a number of statements of prophecy, albeit some appear to be vaticinium ex eventu ("predictions" of events that already occurred). Notably, the conversion of Paul the Apostle is predicted in Chapter 31. The work also seemingly sets a date for the Second Coming of Jesus; chapter 17 says it will come "when the hundredth part and the twentieth part are completed" (Coptic) or "when the hundred and fiftieth year is completed" (Ethiopic), implying the Ethiopic manuscript might have been written after 120 years had already passed. It is not entirely clear when Jesus is counting from (his death? his ascension?), but shows that the audience in the second century still expected the Second Coming to be imminent and the advent of the Kingdom of God within the next few decades.

The work also "predicts" the rise of Gnosticism in a hostile manner: Jesus declares that false teachers will attempt to subvert his message in the future.

=== Prayers for the dead ===
One passage in the Epistle of the Apostles appears to depend on the original form of the Apocalypse of Peter, suggesting that it may have been composed afterward. The Apostles tell Jesus that they are concerned on account of the damned; Jesus compliments them as the righteous too are anxious about sinners, and Jesus promises to hear requests concerning them. This particular theological idea seems to have been common in 2nd century Christianity, and prayer for the dead is still seen among various Christian groups, although beliefs on its theological efficacy varies.

=== Errors ===
In the gospel portion recounting Jesus's life, it is said that he suffered during the days of Pontius Pilate and Herod Archelaus. Archelaus was removed as ethnarch (governor, client-king) in 6 CE, however, and was dead by 18 CE - far earlier than Pilate's term as procurator. The work likely confused him with Herod Antipas.

While not exactly an error, the epistle identifies "Peter" and "Cephas" as two different apostles. While some early traditions did hold that they were separate people, most later Christians were of the opinion that they were two names for the same person, as many Jews of the era had dual names (Cephas being his Aramaic name, Peter his Greek name). The author doesn't seem to place Peter as the primary apostle either, listing him third rather than first, and including Peter in the story of the Incredulity of Thomas as another skeptical disciple offered a chance to prove the resurrected Jesus is real.

== Galilean Discourse ==
In the Ethiopic manuscripts discovered, many of them are codices which start with an Ethiopic version of the Testamentum Domini and then feature a bridge section, likely originally composed in Ethiopic, that connects the Testamentum Domini with the Epistle of the Apostles. Guerrier called it the Testament de Notre-Seigneur et de Notre Sauver Jésus-Christ (Testament of Our Lord and Our Savior Jesus Christ), while others such as Francis Watson have called it the Galilean Discourse. Similar to the main work, it features a resurrected Jesus holding a discourse with his disciples and offering prophecies of the future.

== See also ==
- Apocryphon of James, a similar letter describing secret teachings of Jesus
- Judas the Zealot

== Bibliography ==
- Duensing, Hugo (1963) [1959]. "Epistula Apostolorum". In Schneemelcher, Wilhelm (ed.). New Testament Apocrypha: Volume One: Gospels and Related Writings. Translated by Wilson, Robert McLachlan. Philadelphia: Westminster Press. pp. 189–191.
- Ehrman, Bart (2012). Forgery and Counterforgery: The Use of Literary Deceit in Early Christian Polemics. Oxford University Press. pp. 447–452. ISBN 9780199928033.
- Elliott, James Keith (1993). The Apocryphal New Testament. Oxford University Press. pp. 555–588. ISBN 0-19-826182-9.
- Hill, Charles E. (1999). "The Epistula Apostolorum: An Asian Tract from the Time of Polycarp" (PDF). Journal of Early Christian Studies. 7 (1): 1–53. doi:10.1353/earl.1999.0017. S2CID 170438409.
- Hills, Julian (2008) [1990]. Tradition and Composition in the Epistula Apostolorum. Harvard University Press. ISBN 9780674021310.
- Gantenbein, Florence (2022). "Epistula Apostolorum". In Edwards, J. Christopher (ed.). Early New Testament Apocrypha. Ancient Literature for New Testament Studies 9. Zondervan Academic. pp. 395–415. ISBN 9780310099710.
- Mueller, C.D.G. (1991). "Epistula Apostolorum". New Testament Apocrypha: Volume One: Gospels and Related Writings. Philadelphia: Westminster John Knox Press. pp. 249–251. ISBN 0-664-22721-X.
- Pérès, Jacques-Noël (1994), L'Épître des apôtres et le Testament de N.S. Jésus-Christ, Turnhout, Brepols, coll. « Apocryphes n° 5 », ISBN 2-503-50400-0
- Watson, Francis (2020). An Apostolic Gospel: The 'Epistula Apostolorum' in Literary Context. Cambridge University Press.

Original publications

- Guerrier, Louis; Grébaut, Sylvain (1913). "Le Testament en Galilée de Notre-Seigneur Jésus-Christ: Texte éthiopien, édité et traduit en français". In Graffin, René; Nau, François (eds.). Patrologia Orientalis, Volume 9. Patrologia Orientalis. Paris: Firman-Didot. pp. 140–234.
- Schmidt, Carl (1919). Gespräche Jesu mit seinen Jüngern nach der Auferstehung; ein katholisch-apostolisches Sendschreiben des 2. Jahrhunderts [Conversations of Jesus with His Disciples After the Resurrection; a Catholic and Apostolic Epistle of the 2nd century]. Leipzig.
