= Ebion =

Putative early Christian figure

Ebion (Greek: Ἐβίων) was the presumed eponymous founder of an early Christian group known as the Ebionites. The existent historical evidence indicates that the name "Ebionite" is derived from a Hebrew word, "ebion" (אביון) meaning "poor" and thus not from someone's name. Ebion is generally seen today as a purely literary figure, whose reputed existence in antiquity was used to explain where the Ebionites got their inspiration. However, once he had been accepted as real, a small tradition developed around him that lasted in early learned Christian circles for a few centuries.

== Ebion according to the church fathers ==
Tertullian is the first writer noted for mentioning Ebion, which he does a number of times, mainly related to the notion that Jesus was a man and not divine. As an example, Tertullian writes, if Jesus "were wholly the Son of a man, He should fail to be also the Son of God, and have nothing more than 'a Solomon' or 'a Jonas,'—as Ebion thought we ought to believe concerning Him." In a text called "Against All Heresies", an anonymous work once attributed to Tertullian, Ebion is referred to as the successor to Cerinthus. This places Ebion in the early 2nd century and as part of a particular heretical tradition. By the time Epiphanius wrote his text on heresies, "The Panarion", nearly a century after Tertullian, Ebion had received a birthplace, a hamlet called Cochabe in the district of Bashan, was thought to have travelled through Asia, and even come to Rome.

Jerome believed that Ebion lived at the time of John the Apostle and had been refuted by John for not believing Jesus existed before Mary. He thought that Ebion translated the Old Testament himself and refers to Ebion's baptism.

== See also ==
- Basilides
- Carpocrates
- Cerinthus
- Marcion
- Valentinus
