= Alogi =

Group of heterodox Christians in the Asia Minor region

The Alogi (Greek: ἄλογοι, romanized: alogoi), also called Alogoi or Alogians, were an alleged group of heterodox Christians in Asia Minor that flourished c. 200 AD, and taught that the Gospel of John and the Apocalypse of John were not the work of the Apostle, but his adversary Cerinthus. Though their existence is challenged in scholarship as many modern scholars now doubt the existence of this group all together and call them fictitious, contending Epiphanius of Salamis was the first to tell us about them and that before him we don't get any such information about such a group at all from any report, additionally the tendency of Epiphanius to exaggerate heresies is pointed out too. Thus making them an alleged group, What we know of them if they existed in the first place is derived from their critic, particularly Epiphanius of Salamis. While Epiphanius does not specifically indicate the name of its founder, Dionysius Bar-Salibi, citing a lost work of Hippolytus (Capita Adversus Caium), writes in his commentary on the Apocalypse,

Hippolytus of Rome says: A man appeared, named Caius, saying that the Gospel is not by John, nor the Apocalypse but that it is by Cerinthus the heretic.

Though this account is mostly rejected as very late and unreliable by scholars, there is no historic evidence of Caius rejecting the gospel of John and attributing it to Cerinthus prior to this work. According to 4th-century church historian Eusebius of Caesarea, Caius was a churchman of Rome who wrote during the time of Pope Zephyrinus, and had published a disputation with Proclus, a Montanist leader in Rome, though he never mentions anything about Caius rejecting the gospel of John and attributing it to Cerinthus.

== Beliefs ==
Regarding their beliefs, Epiphanius asserts that the Alogians denied the continuation of spiritual gifts in the church in opposition to the Montanists. Their methodology can be seen in the alleged surviving fragments of Hippolytus of Rome's refutation, Capita Adversus Caium, preserved in Bar-Salibi's Commentary on the Apocalypse. Their comparative method was considered very foolish in Epiphanius’ opinion who derided them as "without reason". Syriacist John Gwynn, who published these fragments in English, likewise indicates that, "The objections of Caius are ... those of a somewhat captious critic, and indicates little breadth of scriptural learning or of eschatological conceptions".

Epiphanius contemplates that they may not reject Christ's deity outright, but instead just the “Logos form under which the doctrine was presented in the Gospel”. Epiphanius also asserts in regard to the Alogi, “they themselves seem to believe as we do.” He therefore is not so much concerned with their Christology as much as he is concerned with their biblical criticism.

== Resources ==
- Gwynn, J. "Hippolytus and his “Heads against Caius”," Hermathena, 6 (1888), 397-418.
- Bludau, A. Die Ersten Gegner der Johannes-Schriften (Biblische Studien, 22, Hefte 1 and 2; 1925).
- Fisher, G. P. "Some Remarks on the Alogi," Papers of the American Society of Church History, 2,1 (1890), pp. 1–9.
- Hall, S. G. "Aloger," in Theologische Realenzyklopadia 2. Edited by G. Krause, G. Muller, et al. Berlin: 1977 ff., 290–95.
- The Panarion of Epiphanius of Salamis: Book II and III, Translated by Frank Williams. Leiden: Brill, 1997. ISBN 90-04-09898-4.
- Rose, V. “Question Johannine. Les Aloges asiatiques et les aloges romains,” Revue Biblique 6 (1897): 516–34.
- Smith, J. D. Gaius and the Controversy over the Johannine Literature (PhD diss.), Yale University, 1979.
- Trevett, Chr. Montanism: Gender, Authority and the New Prophesy (Cambridge, 1996), pp. 29, 66, 138–41, 262–3.
