= Investiture of the Archangel Gabriel =

6th–9th century Coptic text

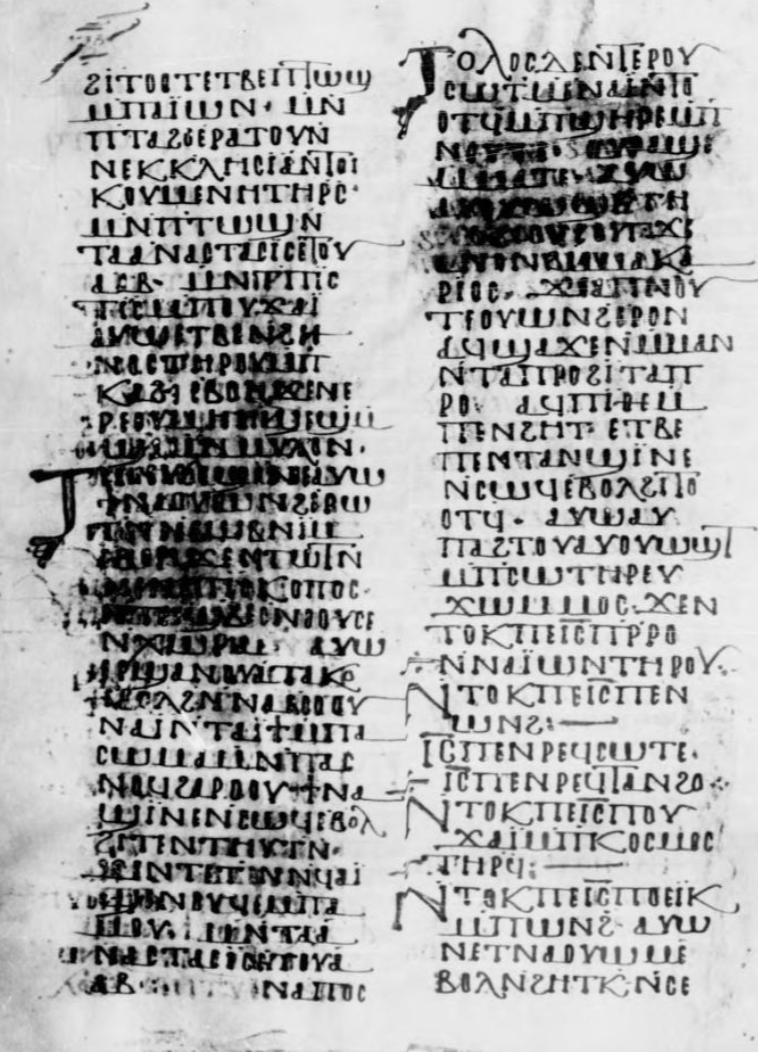
First page of the M.593 version of the Investiture of the Archangel Gabriel

The Investiture of the Archangel Gabriel is a Coptic language work of Christian apocrypha on Christian angelology. It was probably composed between the 6th and 9th centuries by an Egyptian Christian. There is only a single surviving complete manuscript held by the Morgan Library & Museum, and it immediately follows a work known as the Investiture of the Archangel Michael.

The Investiture is pseudepigraphically attributed to the testimony of the deacon Stephen (from Acts 6 and Acts 7). Coptic Christianity of the era had "apostolic memoirs" as a popular genre that would attribute themselves to figures from the Apostolic Age to emphasize their antiquity and authority. Much of the work consists of speeches given by Jesus, the angel Gabriel, and other angels, encouraging the listeners to care for the poor by making generous donations. It is considered likely that the purpose of the book was to be read in liturgy on Gabriel's feast day of 22 Koiak. The work explains Gabriel was invested with the rank of archangel on that day. It provides an extended backstory and background for Gabriel while encouraging the listeners to participate in church fundraising.

== Manuscripts and authorship ==
The only complete surviving manuscript is M.593, found near the ruins of the Monastery of St. Michael in 1910–1911 in the southern part of the Faiyum province, Egypt. It is pages 61–100 of the manuscript and follows the similarly titled Investiture of the Archangel Michael (pages 1–60). The manuscript was purchased by agents of J. P. Morgan and became part of the Morgan Library & Museum. According to the colophon of the manuscript, it was copied in 892/893 CE (Year of the Martyrs 609 in the Coptic calendar, counting from the persecution of Diocletian) by "John the Psalmist" and dedicated to a monastery of the Archangel Michael at Phantau. Two small fragments of the work are preserved in another manuscript held by the Morgan Library, M.668.

It is not known precisely when the work was originally written, other than that it must have been in the ninth century or earlier due to the date of M.593. Lance Jenott suggests that the sixth century is a good guess, as there is a surviving 6th-century writing from bishop John of Parallos that mentions the Investiture of the Archangel Michael by name and criticizes those who celebrate his feast die on 12 Hathor. It seems reasonable that the Investiture of the Archangel Gabriel may have also existed during the period. Egyptian Christian interest in angels and archangels seems to have been high in the era. Other similar contemporary works exist such as the Investiture of Abbaton the Angel of Death and various homilies and encomiums dedicated to the topic, attributed to figures from the Apostolic Age.

== Contents ==
The Savior turned again to Gabriel and said to him: "My esteemed messenger, reveal your powers and the rest of your wonders so my elect apostles may see and proclaim them throughout the entire world, and so all who hear of them may keep them and be saved from the judge."

— Investiture of Gabriel the Archangel 8:1

The text introduces itself as set during the 40 days the risen Jesus walked the Earth, told to Stephen by the apostles and recorded by him. Jesus and the apostles hold a dialogue on a mountain, and Thomas the Apostle asks for information regarding the angels and in particular details on the archangel Gabriel. Angels greet the apostles and tell stories of their name and role in maintaining creation. In particular, one extended narrative is of an angel appointed over the future Judgment Day, where all will be brought to the Valley of Josaphat and the good separated from the wicked.

Gabriel himself appears and tells of his deeds throughout history, such as telling Abraham of his coming children. Some of the stories are expansions on Biblical stories; for example, Gabriel recounts announcing the coming birth of Jesus to Mary as described in Luke 1, but then adds to the story by Gabriel telling Mary to her open her mouth, and then her "eating" a mystical cloud that is apparently the Holy Spirit. This tradition is not unique to this manuscript, as other Islamic traditions of the 9th century also involve Mary ingesting the Holy Spirit orally, suggesting a shared (if minority) tradition between Egyptian Christians and Muslims. At least one story appears unique to the manuscript: Gabriel says that he rescued the patriarch Enoch's sister Sibla from a devil who "wanted to do dirty things with her."

After impressing the apostles, Gabriel launches into a second speech that is an exhortation to charity. He promises that those who help the needy and feed the poor will be richly rewarded in the afterlife. Gabriel loosely quotes Hosea 6:6 and says that God desires charity more than sacrifice, as well as Matthew 25 where Jesus says that those who help the hungry, sick, and needy will be blessed. This was likely read as part of fundraising efforts for churches on Gabriel's feast day; Jesus later confirms Gabriel's offer and offers "a ten-thousandfold of the kingdom" for those who provide an offering in Gabriel's name, open a bottle of wine for him, or provide for the copying of this book itself.

Some of the backstory of the devil is described by Jesus. The devil was the first angel created, yet he arrogantly refused to worship Adam when commanded by God. His name is given as "Saklataboth" - likely an echo of influence of the demiurge from Gnosticism, which called the false creator God both "Saklas" and "Yaldabaoth". Additionally, God banishes him and "overturns his aeon" as punishment, another usage of a word from Gnosticism if one that means something different in the author's context. Jesus decrees Michael and Gabriel's feast day to match the day they were appointed by God to be archangels: 12 Hathor for Michael, and Gabriel the following month in 22 Koiak. Jesus also reminds the listeners that his own birthday (that is, Christmas) was 29 Koiak. The apostles sing hymns of praise. Jesus closes with a version of the Great Commission, telling the apostles to preach to all the world.

== Translations and editions ==
Henri Hyvernat of the Morgan Library published photographs of the Coptic script in M.593 in 1922. Caspar Detlef Gustav Müller published an analysis and translation into German in 1962. Lance Jenott published an English translation in 2020.

- Hyvernat, Henri (1922). Bibliotheca Pierpont Morgan Codices Coptici Photographice Expressi. Vol. 27. Morgan Library. (see folios 31r–50)
- Müller, C. D. G. (1962). Die Bücher der Einsetzung der Erzengel Michael und Gabriel (in German). Secretariat du Corpus SCO.
- Jenott, Lance (2020). "The Investiture of the Archangel Gabriel: A New Translation and Introduction". In Burke, Tony (ed.). New Testament Apocrypha: More Noncanonical Scriptures. Vol. 2. Eerdmans. pp. 565–575. ISBN 978-0-8028-7290-6.
