= Cerinthus =

Syrian theologian and philosopher

Cerinthus (Greek: Κήρινθος, romanized: Kērinthos; fl. c. 50-100 CE) was an early Gnostic, who was prominent as a heresiarch in the view of the early Church Fathers. Contrary to the Church Fathers, he used the Gospel of Cerinthus, and denied that the Supreme God made the material world. In Cerinthus' interpretation, the Christ descended upon Jesus at baptism and guided him in ministry and the performing of miracles, but left him at the crucifixion. Similarly to the Ebionites, he maintained that Jesus was not born of a virgin, but was a mere man, the biological son of Mary and Joseph.

Early Christian tradition describes Cerinthus as a contemporary to and opponent of John the Evangelist, who may have written the First Epistle of John and the Second Epistle of John to warn the less mature in faith and doctrine about the changes Cerinthus was making to the original gospel. According to early Christian sources, the Apostle John wrote his gospel specifically to refute the teachings of Cerinthus.

All that is known about Cerinthus comes from the writings of his theological opponents or "hostile witnesses", which makes it challenging to be certain of the details of his life and beliefs.

== Biography ==
Cerinthus flourished during the second half of the first century, though the date of his birth and his death are unknown. None of Cerinthus' actual writings seem to have survived. Our most detailed understanding of the man Cerinthus' teachings are from the 4th century Bishop Epiphanius of Salamis, a few centuries after his death, though Irenaeus of Lyon (c. 135–202) briefly outlines Cerinthus' beliefs in his five books against Gnosticism. Publication of surviving fragments of Hippolytus of Rome's (c. 170–235) Capita Adversus Caium demonstrate Epiphanius drew heavily from Hippolytus' Refutation of the Thirty-two Heresies.

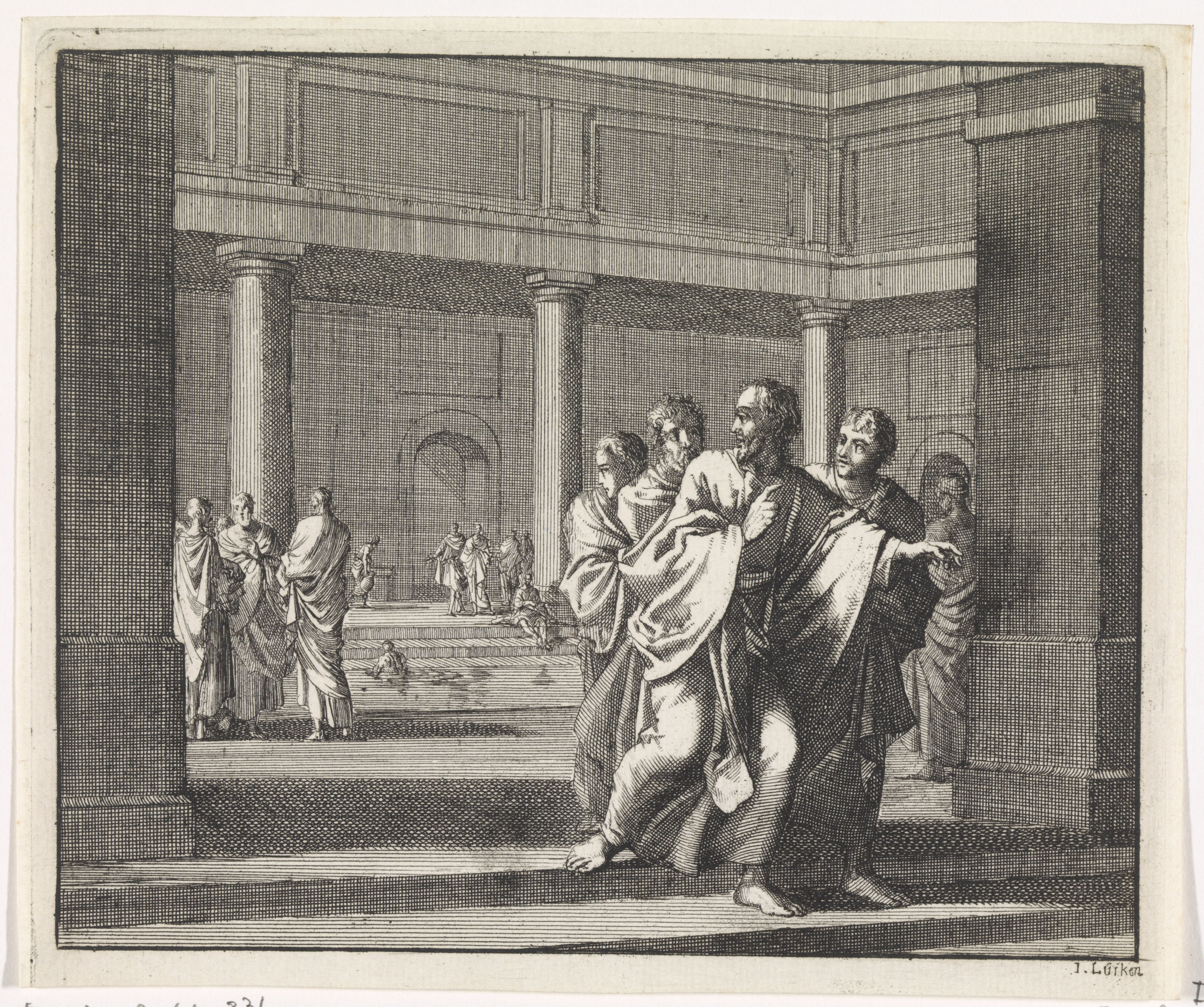
John and the heretic Cerinthus in the bathhouse, 1701 engraving by Jan Luyken

Irenaeus writes that Cerinthus was educated in the Gnosis of the Egyptians. According to Epiphanius, Cerinthus was the instigator of trouble against the Apostles Paul and Peter at Jerusalem, and had sent out men to Antioch commanding that gentile converts must be circumcised and keep the Law, prompting the convention of the Jerusalem Council (c. 50). After these things, Epiphanius says that Cerinthus founded a school in the Roman province of Asia Minor, which at its height spread into the province of Galatia. According to Galatian tradition, Paul wrote his epistle to the Galatians against Cerinthus' followers who were troubling the church.

In Asia, early Christian writers identify Cerinthus as an adversary of the Apostle John. According to Irenaeus, his teacher Polycarp, himself a student of John, told the story that John rushed out of a bathhouse at Ephesus without bathing when he found out Cerinthus was inside, exclaiming, "Let us fly, lest even the bath-house fall down, because Cerinthus, the enemy of the truth, is inside!" Irenaeus also relates that John sought by proclamation of his gospel "to remove that error which by Cerinthus had been disseminated among men".

== Beliefs ==
We do not have a fully developed understanding of Cerinthus' teachings. The earliest surviving account of Cerinthus is that in Irenaeus' refutation of Gnosticism, Adversus haereses, which was written about 170 AD. According to Irenaeus, Cerinthus, a man educated in the wisdom of the Egyptians, claimed angelic inspiration.

The Epistula Apostolorum, a little-known 2nd-century text discovered in 1895, which is roughly contemporary (c. 160–170) with the above work of Irenaeus, was written polemically against the teachings of Cerinthus, beginning with an admonition to those who might follow the teachings of Simon and Cerinthus.

=== Scripture ===
Cerinthus utilized a gospel identical to that of the Ebionites, which the early church fathers identify as an unorthodox version of the Gospel of Matthew.

=== Creation ===
Cerinthus taught that the visible world and heavens were not made by the supreme being, but by a lesser power (Demiurge) distinct from him. He taught that this power was ignorant of the existence of the Supreme God.

His use of the term demiurge (literally, craftsman) for the creator fits Platonic, Neopythagorean, Middle Platonic, and Neoplatonic schools of philosophy, which dominated the learned environment of the eastern Mediterranean, see also Hellenistic Judaism. Unlike true Gnostics that followed him, Cerinthus taught that the demiurge was not evil, more like Philo's logos than the egotistical demiurge taught by Valentinus.

=== Jesus Christ ===
Cerinthus distinguished between the man Jesus and the Christ. He denied the supernatural virgin birth of Jesus, making him the biological son of Joseph and Mary, and taught that the Christ descended upon him in the form of a dove from the Supreme Ruler at baptism (see also Adoptionism) and left him again at his crucifixion—never to embody the flesh. Cerinthus is also said to have taught that Jesus will be raised from the dead at the Last Day, when all men will rise with him.

In describing Jesus as a natural-born man, Cerinthus agreed with the Ebionites. In portraying Christ as a spirit that came from heaven, undertook its divine task in the material world, and then returned, he anticipates the fully developed Christian Gnosticism in later decades. Irenaeus numbers Cerinthus among those Gnostics who denied that Jesus is the Logos (Word).

=== Jewish law ===
Cerinthus is claimed to have instructed his followers to maintain strict adherence to both Written and Oral Torah Mosaic law for the attainment of salvation. This soteriological worldview is termed legalism. This view contradicts the soteriology conveyed at the Council of Jerusalem (c. 50 AD), which gave the understanding that Christians are not required to be circumcised to attain salvation. The account in Acts chapter 15 lists four requirements for Gentile converts to Christianity. However, certain Jewish Christian sects, including the Cerinthians, recognized Mosaic law as both practicable and necessary.

=== Eschatology ===
Eusebius of Caesarea, in his Ecclesiastical History, relates how, according to Caius of Rome, Cerinthus,

...by means of revelations which he pretends were written by a great apostle, brings before us marvelous things which he falsely claims were shown him by angels; and he says that after the resurrection the kingdom of Christ will be set up on earth, and that the flesh dwelling in Jerusalem will again be subject to desires and pleasures. And being an enemy of the Scriptures of God, he asserts, with the purpose of deceiving men, that there is to be a period of a thousand years for marriage festivals.

It is, however, improbable that this statement is true of Cerinthus' beliefs. Caius of Rome is identified with those whom Epiphanius of Salamis styles the Alogi, who, "refusing to accept an 'apocryphon' because of the deep and difficult sayings in the Revelation . . . say that they are not John's composition but Cernthus', and have no right to a place in the church." Caius' view was refuted by his contemporary, Hippolytus of Rome, in a lost work entitled Capita Adversus Caium (Heads Against Caius), of which only fragments preserved in a commentary of Dionysius Bar-Salibi survive.

== Works attributed to Cerinthus ==
Cerinthus may be the alleged recipient of the Apocryphon of James (codex I, text 2 of the Nag Hammadi library), although the name written is largely illegible. A late second century Christian sect (later dubbed the Alogi) headed by Caius of Rome alleged Cerinthus was the true author of the Gospel of John and Book of Revelation. According to Catholic Encyclopedia: Caius: "Additional light has been thrown on the character of Caius's dialogue against Proclus by Gwynne's publication of some fragments from the work of Hippolytus "Contra Caium" (Hermathena, VI, p. 397 sq.); from these it seems clear that Caius maintained that the Apocalypse of John was a work of the Gnostic Cerinthus." The Book of Revelation (Apocalypse) is attributed to John by Christians before that time; third century theologian Tertullian indicates that all John's foster churches (i.e., the churches of Asia Minor) when traced back to the beginning all rested on the Apostle John as its author, and that it receives the same recognition in all the other churches. Irenaeus makes consistent remarks.

== Cerinthus in literature ==
Cerinthus is featured in John's Story: The Last Eyewitness, part of Christian writer Tim LaHaye's The Jesus Chronicles. In the book Cerinthus, much to the disciple John's frustration, has begun spreading his gnostic teachings to the populace, whereupon John is moved to write his counter-argument: the Gospel of John.

Cerinthus is mentioned in Robert Browning's poem A Death in the Desert, which recounts the death of John the Apostle. The poem concludes with the line "But 'twas Cerinthus that was lost."

== See also ==
- Against Heresies (Irenaeus)
- Ebion
- Proto-Gnosticism

== Sources ==
- Hill, Charles Evan (2006). From the Lost Teaching of Polycarp: Identifying Irenaeus' Apostolic Presbyter and the Author of Ad Diognetum. Mohr Siebeck. ISBN 978-3-16-148699-9.
