= Caspar Detlef Gustav Müller =

German Coptologist (1927–2003)

C.D.G. Müller, undated photograph but probably around 1985–1987

Caspar Detlef Gustav Müller (19 July 1927 - 24 January 2003) was a German Coptologist, Ethiopanist, and historian of religion. His specialty was the Coptic Church in Egypt as well as Christianity in Ethiopia, and was a scholar of various languages including Coptic, Amharic, and Ge'ez (classical Ethiopic). He served as chair for the study of the Christian Orient at the University of Bonn. His tenure as professor there was from 1976 to 1993, when he took emeritus status.

== Biography ==
C.D.G. Müller was born in Berlin, Germany on 19 July 1927. He performed his undergraduate studies in his hometown at the Humboldt University of Berlin, where he studied Oriental studies, Egyptology under Fritz Hintze, Protestant theology, and American studies. In 1949 he moved to Heidelberg University, where he continued his studies under the church historian and theologian Hans von Campenhausen. There, he received his doctorate in theology, with his dissertation Die alte koptische Predigt ("The Old-Coptic Preaching"). As an employee of the Heidelberg Academy of Sciences and Humanities, he continued his education at Heidelberg; his habilitation thesis in 1959 was Die Engellehre der koptischen Kirche ("The Angelology of the Coptic Church"). In 1962, he published a book translating the manuscript M.593 for the first time, which contained the Investiture of the Archangel Michael and the Investiture of Gabriel the Archangel. In 1966 he began to teach church history at Heidelberg, particularly of the Christian Church in the Orient.

In 1976 he gained a tenure track position as a professor at the Friedrich Wilhelm University of Bonn in Bonn. In 1979 he took the newly created chair for the study of the Christian Orient there. A festschrift was published in his honor in 1988 for his 60th birthday, Nubia et oriens christianus. Festschrift für C. Detlef G. Müller zum 60. Geburtstag. In 1993, he took emeritus status and retired.

Müller died in Bonn on 24 January 2003 after a long struggle with illness.

== Selected works ==
As author:

- Die alte koptische Predigt. Versuche eines Überblicks. Hessische Druckerei, Darmstadt 1954, OCLC 831065294 (dissertation, Heidelberg 1953).
- Die Engellehre der koptischen Kirche – Untersuchungen zur Geschichte der christlichen Frömmigkeit in Ägypten. Harrassowitz, Wiesbaden 1959, OCLC 422026477 (habilitation thesis, Heidelberg).
- Die Bücher der Einsetzung der Erzengel Michael und Gabriel. Secretariat du Corpus SCO, Louvain 1962, OCLC 46320204.
- Kirche und Mission unter den Arabern in vorislamischer Zeit. Antrittsvorlesung. J.C.B. Mohr, Tübingen 1967, OCLC 8518574.
- Grundzüge des christlich-islamischen Ägypten von der Ptolemäerzeit bis zur Gegenwart (= Grundzüge. Band 11). Wissenschaftliche Buchgesellschaft, Darmstadt 1969, OCLC 615148317.
- Geschichte der orientalischen Nationalkirchen (= Die Kirche in ihrer Geschichte. Lieferung D,2. Band 1). Vandenhoeck und Ruprecht, Göttingen 1981, ISBN 3-525-52314-9.

As an editor:

- Benjamin I. Patriarch von Alexandrien: Die Homilie über die Hochzeit zu Kana und weitere Schriften (= Abhandlungen der Heidelberger Akademie der Wissenschaften, Philosophisch-Historische Klasse. Jahrgang 1968, Abhandlung 1). Winter, Heidelberg 1968, OCLC 64538867.
- Märchen aus Äthiopien. Diederichs, München 1992, ISBN 3-424-01092-8.

Festschrift:

- Scholz, Piotr O.; Stempel, Reinhard (eds.). Nubia et oriens christianus. Festschrift für C. Detlef G. Müller zum 60. Geburtstag. Nubica. Bibliotheca Nubica 1. Cologne: Dinter. ISBN 3-924794-08-1.
