= Gunnar Rosendal =

Swedish Lutheran priest (1897–1988)

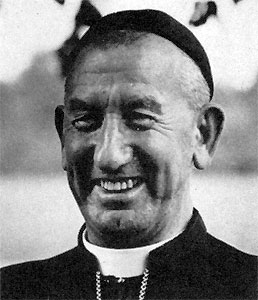
Gunnar Rosendal (1967)

Gunnar Rosendal (4 April 1897 – 26 December 1988) was a Swedish Lutheran priest, Doctor of Theology, and parish priest of Osby. Through his books promoting High Church Lutheran theology and spirituality, especially Kyrklig förnyelse (1935), he became a leading and disputed figure of the Catholic movement in the Church of Sweden.

== Early life ==
Rosendal was born in Grevie parish, Scania, Sweden, the son of Andreas and Teolinda Rosendal. His mother died early and his father moved to the United States so he and his sister were raised by an aunt. After graduating from Lunds Privata Elementarskola he began his theological studies at Lund University in 1918. He was ordained on 25 May 1922 by bishop Gottfrid Billing and moved to Väsby to begin his work as a priest.

== International contacts ==
Rosendal had many contacts to the liturgical movement in the Roman Catholic church, especially in Benedictine monasteries, and personally knew many theologians of the liturgical and ecumenical movement, such as Pius Parsch and Paul Couturier. He also had plenty of contacts with Anglo-Catholicism in the Church of England, e.g. Dom Gregory Dix, and was member of Fellowship of Saint Alban and Saint Sergius. Rosendal often liked to portray himself as Catholic as possible, but was also rooted in the theology of 17th-century Lutheran orthodoxy, which he knew well. On the recommendation of Bo Giertz he began to read books by Carl Olof Rosenius, which made a lasting impression. Rosendal himself used the neo-Thomistic paradigm and resisted all kinds of liberal theology as well as the dialectical theology of Karl Barth. Rosendal was one of the theologians that worked for the foundation of the International League for Apostolic Faith and Order (ILAFO).

== Legacy ==
Rosendal died in Kristianstad in 1988. In Sweden his influence can be seen in the foundation of the high-church organization arbetsgemenskapen Kyrklig Förnyelse (aKF), which was inspired by his book, Kyrklig förnyelse.
