= Kyrklig förnyelse =

1935 book by Gunnar Rosendal

Kyrklig förnyelse (name translates as 'church revival' or 'churchly renewal'), published in 1935, is a manifesto of the Scandinavian Lutheran High Church movement, written by Swedish priest Gunnar Rosendal.

Kyrklig förnyelse was the first of a series of nine books by Rosendal that would advocate high-church theology and Catholic liturgical renewal of the worship within the Church of Sweden. It was soon followed by Kyrklig förnyelse i församlingskyrkan ('Church revival in the parish church'), where he responds to the discussion aroused by the book. The book was based on content he had begun to spread through publication, talks, and among local priests beginning in the previous decade; both books were written after Rosendal had already practised his reform in his own parish.

== Content of the book ==
Kyrklig förnyelse has a comprehensive vision of what was needed for the Church. Rosendal proposed four features as basic to the Church, its confessional, sacramental, hierarchical and liturgical character: the Book of Concord, sacraments, holy orders and liturgy. These four features each have their own chapter. Preaching of the Word and the Sacrament of the Altar must be the center of Christian life. Baptism must be more than a rite at birth; it must set its mark on the Christian life. The pastoral leadership of the hierarchy needed to be revitalized. The liturgy must be a witness to heavenly beauty and also to give expression to the whole meaning of the sacraments. The last chapter includes a warning. For those who see "danger of Roman Catholicism" in the revival, Rosendal points out that there is indeed a Roman danger, but it will come if Catholic renewal is not carried through. In that case people will find the One, Holy, Catholic, and Apostolic Church in the Church of Rome instead of the Church of Sweden.
