= Investiture of the Archangel Michael =

Apocryphal text

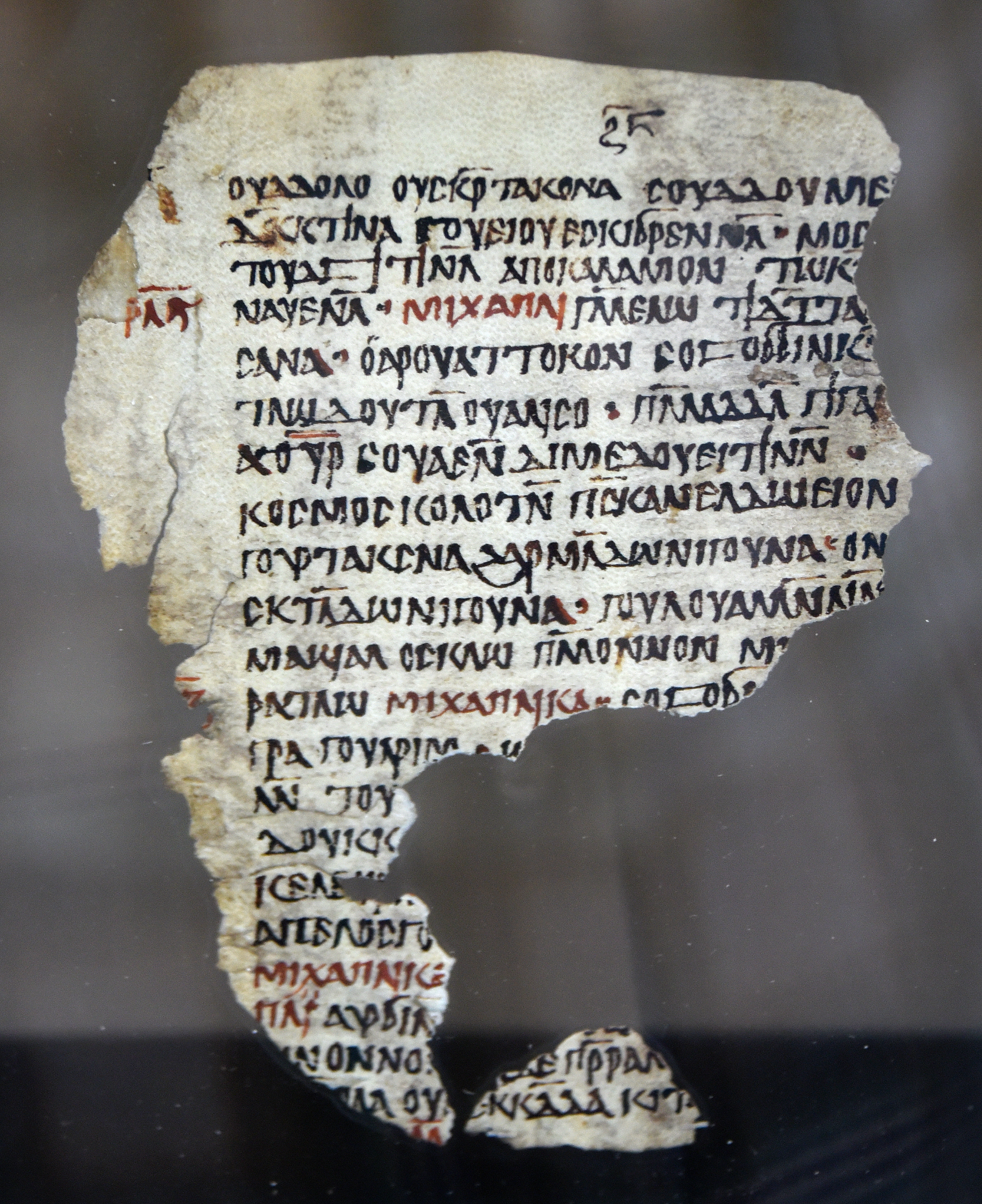
A fragment from an Old Nubian translation of the text with Michael's name in red

The Investiture of the Archangel Michael, also known as the Book of the Investiture of the Holy Archangel Michael and the Book of the Investiture of Michael, is a text of New Testament apocrypha. It is pseudepigrapha, purportedly written by John the Apostle, and part of a genre of "apostolic memoirs" popular in Coptic literature of the period. The work describes the importance of Michael, an archangel, in Christianity, as well as the role of Satan in several biblical events. Manuscripts exist in the Coptic language, and fragments exist in Old Nubian and Medieval Greek.

== Background ==
In most of Christianity, Michael, an archangel, is of fairly little importance. In the Christianity of Egypt, particularly in Coptic language writings, he is relatively more important, and he appears in several texts.

== Manuscripts and authorship ==
The Investiture of the Archangel Michael is primarily attested to in three Coptic language writings. The only complete manuscript is the 9th-century M.593, held by the Morgan Library & Museum and based on a Sahidic Coptic manuscript recovered from the ruins of the Monastery of St. Michael at Phantau in the Faiyum Province of Egypt. The manuscript indicates in the colophon it was created in 892 or 893, and the manuscript includes the Investiture of Gabriel the Archangel immediately following it. M.614 is an incomplete manuscript in Fayumic Coptic that also originated from the same find as M.593. A second Sahidic version from the 9th–11th century was later discovered, and was created at the White Monastery of Egypt. A small Greek fragment was found from Serra East in Lower Nubia, and an Old Nubian fragment was found at Qasr Ibrim.

The author of the work is unknown. Hugo Lundhaug suggests that Coptic was likely the original language and Egypt was the presumed origin, as there aren't any signs of the work being a translation. Others have suggested that an original Greek edition of the text may date to before 600. The earliest attestation to the work is from around 600, with bishop John of Parallos's Contra Libros Haereticorum condemning the work (although his condemnations apparently did not stop further copies from being made in later centuries). (Note: Kelly 2006, p. 236, describes a "late fifth-century" copy of the text existing.)

== Contents ==
In two of the three main manuscripts of the text, John the Apostle is the purported writer. It describes the fall of Satan and his replacement by Michael; the creation of the seven archangels (including Satan, known as Saklataboth) and their purposes (to worship God); Satan causing the beheading of John the Baptist; John the Baptist's age at death, varying between 31 and 34 between manuscripts; and the theological importance of reverence for Michael.

== Influences and other works ==
The description of the reason for Satan's fall – that he refused to worship Adam when ordered to by God – mirrors a story in Islamic tradition and the Quran. The work also shares aspects of the Stoning of the Devil from the Islamic hajj. The nature of these connections is difficult to determine more conclusively, but do suggest a shared cultural background between Egyptian Christians and Muslims.

There are several similarities between the Investiture of the Archangel Michael and the Coptic Apocalypse of Paul, particularly a shared cosmological belief system and shared physical description of hell. However, their theological understandings of heaven and hell are dissimilar.

== Notes and references ==
=== Works cited ===
- Kelly, Christopher (2006). Ruling the later Roman Empire. Revealing Antiquity. Harvard University Press. ISBN 9780674039452.
- Lanzillotta, Lautaro Roig; van der Vliet, Jacques (2022). The Apocalypse of Paul (Visio Pauli) in Sahidic Coptic. Vigiliae Christianae, Supplements. Brill. ISBN 9789004526471.
- Lundhaug, Hugo (2019). "Textual fluidity and monastic fanfiction: The case of Investiture of the Archangel Michael in Coptic Egypt". In Gilhus, Ingvild Sælid; Tsakos, Alexandros; Wright, Marta Camilla (eds.). The archangel Michael in Africa: History, cult, and persona. Bloomsbury. ISBN 9781350084735.
- Lundhaug, Hugo (2020). "The Investiture of the Archangel Michael: A New Translation and Introduction". In Burke, Tony (ed.). New Testament Apocrypha: More Noncanonical Scriptures. Vol. 2. Eerdmans. pp. 499–558. ISBN 978-0-8028-7290-6.
