= Apocryphon of James =

Gnostic epistle

The Apocryphon of James, also called the Secret Book of James or the Apocryphal Epistle of James, is a Gnostic epistle. It is the second tractate in Codex I of the Nag Hammadi library. The tractate is a Coptic translation of a Greek original, probably written in Egypt, with estimates of the date ranging from c. 100 AD to c. 200 AD. The content of the text mainly consists of James the Just's recollection of a special revelation that Jesus gave to James and Peter. The topics discussed include being filled, believing in the cross, being eager for the Word, and the importance of knowing the self.

== Summary ==
The intended recipient of the letter from James is unclear because of damage to the document. Only the ending part of the name is known (Coptic: [...]ⲑⲟⲥ), but a few scholars suggest restoring the name as Cerinthus.

James says he has written a secret book in Hebrew, revealed to him by Jesus, and has sent it to the recipient of the letter, who is "a minister of the salvation of the saints." He warns to be careful not to reveal the book to many people, since it was not meant to be revealed even to all of the twelve disciples. Jesus appeared to the disciples after he had left, and he commanded James and Peter to be filled. Jesus reminded them that they had seen the human Son, and they should be filled and leave no space empty, or he who is coming will mock them.

Peter questions why Jesus keeps telling them to "be filled" with the spirit when they already feel full. Jesus responds by explaining that being filled with the spirit is good, and lacking is bad, but it is also good to lack when they can fill themselves. He encourages them to be filled with the spirit. James then asks for help not to be tempted by the Devil, and Jesus responds by saying that if they are oppressed and persecuted but still do the Father's will, they will be loved and considered equals. He urges them not to fear suffering and reminds them of his own crucifixion. Jesus tells them not to fear death, and the Kingdom of God belongs to those who have believed in his cross.

James asks Jesus if they can prophesy to those who ask for it. Jesus replies that the head of prophecy was cut off with John the Baptist. James questions how this is possible, and Jesus explains that prophecy comes from the head, and when the head is removed, so is prophecy. Jesus urges his disciples to be eager for salvation, to hate hypocrisy and evil intention, and to acquire knowledge to find the kingdom of heaven. He tells them to be sober, not to go astray, and to trust him. Additionally, he advises them to listen to the word, understand knowledge, love life, and not to persecute or oppress themselves.

Jesus rebukes those who have falsified knowledge and are sinners against the spirit. He reminds them to weep, mourn, and preach what is good, and to follow him quickly since they are loved ones who will bring life to many people. He warns that few will find the kingdom of heaven and that blessings will be on those who have spoken out and acquired grace for themselves. He encourages them to know themselves and be eager to harvest for themselves a head of the grain of life, to pay attention to him while he is with them, and to remember him when he is far from them. He warns them to not let the kingdom of heaven become a desert within them and to act toward themselves as he has toward them.

Peter expresses that sometimes Jesus urges them towards the kingdom of heaven and other times he turns them away. Jesus reminds them that they have received life through faith and knowledge. He tells them that whoever receives life and believes in the kingdom will never leave it, not even if banished. Jesus then ascends to heaven, leaving Peter and James to hear hymns and angelic praises. They are asked by the other disciples what he told them, and they answer that he promised them life and commanded them to love the "children coming after us," possibly meaning the Gnostic community for whom the work was written. James closes the letter with a prayer for everyone to receive a share of salvation.
