= Proclus (Montanist) =

Proclus, Proklos (Greek: Πρόκλος), or Proculus is the name of a follower of Montanus in antiquity. He probably lived in the 2nd century AD. The sect called the Procliani were named after him, and the mainstream Catholic church considered them sufficiently heretical to require rebaptizing if they returned to the church.
