= Isis-Urania Temple =

British secret society

The Isis-Urania Temple was the first temple of the Hermetic Order of the Golden Dawn. The three founders, Dr. William Robert Woodman, William Wynn Westcott, and Samuel Liddell MacGregor Mathers, were Freemasons and members of Societas Rosicruciana in Anglia (S.R.I.A.). It continued as one of four daughter organisations into which the Hermetic Order of the Golden Dawn fragmented, the others being the Alpha et Omega, the Stella Matutina and Aleister Crowley's A∴A∴.

== History ==
In October 1887, Westcott wrote to Anna Sprengel, whose name and address he received through the decoding of the Cipher Manuscripts. A reply was purported to have been received with much wisdom, and honorary grades of Exempt Adept were conferred upon Westcott, Mathers and Woodman, as well as a charter to establish a Golden Dawn temple to work the five grades outlined in the manuscripts.

In 1888, the Isis-Urania temple in London was founded, in which the rituals decoded from the cipher manuscripts were developed and practiced. In addition, there was an insistence on women being allowed to participate in the Order in "perfect equality" with men, which was in contrast to the Societas Rosicruciana in Anglia (S.R.I.A.) and Masonry.

Towards the end of 1899, the Adepts of the Isis-Urania and Amen-Ra temples had become extremely dissatisfied with Mathers' leadership, as well as his growing friendship with Aleister Crowley. They were also anxious to make contact with the Secret Chiefs, instead of dealing with them through Mathers. Among the personal disagreements within the Isis-Urania temple, there were disputes between Florence Farr's The Sphere, a secret society within the Isis-Urania, and the rest of the Adeptus Minors.

== Separation ==
After the Isis-Urania temple declared its independence, there were even more disputes, leading to the resignation of William Butler Yeats. A committee of three was to temporarily govern, which included P. W. Bullock, M. W. Blackden and John William Brodie-Innes. After a short time, Bullock resigned, and Dr. Robert Felkin took his place. During this time they fell into conflict with Annie Horniman which led to her leaving the order for good.

In May 1903, Brodie Innes attempted to pass a new constitution in which he would become head of the order. He was opposed by a majority of the remaining members led by Arthur Edward Waite, Marcus Blackden, and William Alexander Ayton. The Waite group proposed that the order should be reorganised and refocused in a mystical direction retaining control of the Isis-Urania temple, while those wishing to pursue active magical operations should separate. This led a minority under Felkin and Brodie-Innes, and including Yeats, to separate to form the Stella Matutina.

== Independent and Rectified Rite of the Golden Dawn ==
Waite, Blackden and Ayton were now the leaders of the order which they now named Independent and Rectified Rite of the Golden Dawn or the Holy Order of the Golden Dawn which aimed at exploring mysticism. However Blackden and Ayton in fact took no active role leaving Waite in charge. Those who adhered to the reformed order included Arthur Machen, Algernon Blackwood, Pamela Colman Smith, and Isabelle de Steiger. The order also gained an active new member Evelyn Underhill in 1905. After Ayton's death, Col. Webber took his place. Waite continued his Isis-Urania Temple work during the years leading up to World War I and initially maintained a somewhat peaceful relationship with the Amoun Temple of the Stella Matutina though refusing contact with Alpha et Omega.

The new temple, Francis King argued, "abandoned all magical work, abolished examination within the Second Order and used heavily revised rituals designed to express a somewhat tortuous Christian mysticism. These revisions were carried out by Waite putting them into action in 1910, and have been described by King as "pompous and long windedness". Waite's alterations to the rituals were partially inspired by his investigations into the origins of the Cipher Manuscripts which began in 1908.

Waite concluded that the manuscripts inconsistencies meant they could not reflect genuine ancient Egyptian traditions as had been claimed, and in fact had been composed some time in the late nineteenth century. This led to a virulent new dispute between those who accepted Waite's findings and those who did not. These disputes brought Marcus Blackden out of seclusion to argue that the cypher manuscripts represented genuine ancient knowledge transmitted orally via the Egyptian fellaheen.

This conflict led Waite to close the temple in 1914 and forming a new order, the Fellowship of the Rosy Cross in complete independence from the Golden Dawn and its offshoots, taking a number of members with him. R. A. Gilbert backs Waite's explanation for the end of the order, while King speculates that real reason for the ending of the order was that a number of the Adepts had a strong dislike for Waite's new rituals.

== See also ==
- Rosicrucianism
