= Kenneth R. H. Mackenzie =

English linguist, orientalist and autodidact

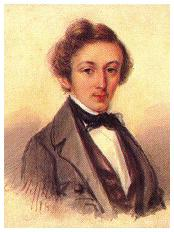
- Born: October 31, 1833; Deptford near London
- Died: July 3, 1886 (aged 52)

Kenneth Robert Henderson Mackenzie (31 October 1833 – 3 July 1886) was an English linguist, orientalist, autodidact and member of the S.R.I.A.

== Early life ==
Mackenzie was born on 31 October 1833 at Deptford near London, England. The following year, his family lived in Vienna, where his father, Dr. Rowland Hill Mackenzie, was assistant surgeon in the midwifery department at Imperial Hospital. When Dr. Mackenzie and his wife returned to England around 1840, Kenneth remained in Vienna for his education, excelling in languages (German, French, Latin, Greek, and Hebrew). At 17, he was back in London, where he worked in the publishing office of Benjamin Disraeli.

== Literary career ==
In 1851, when Mackenzie was just 18, his short introductory biography of Homer, a translation of a text by Herodotus, appeared in Theodore Alois Buckley’s The Odyssey of Homer, with the Hymns, Epigrams, and Battles of the Frogs and Mice. Literally Translated, with Explanatory Notes (London: Henry Bohn). At the beginning of the book, Buckley thanked Mackenzie for his Life of Homer: Attributed to Herodotus, writing, For the translation of the Pseudo-Herodotean Life of Homer, the reader is indebted to the industry of Kenneth Mackenzie, Esq. It is the earliest memoir of the supposed author of the Iliad we possess. ("Care and an excellent education seconding the happy talents with which nature had endowed him, [he] soon surpassed his school fellows in every attainment," Mackenzie wrote of the young Homer. "[W]hen older, he... taught in the school of Phemius, where every one applauded him.")

In 1852, the year of publication of his translation, from German, of Karl Richard Lepsius’ Briefe aus Aegypten, Aethiopen (Discoveries in Egypt, Ethiopia and the Peninsula of Sinai), Mackenzie also translated, from Danish, Hans Christian Andersen’s In Sweden (published in the book The Story of My Life; and In Sweden). For T. A. Buckley’s 1852 book Great Cities of the Ancient World, Mackenzie supplied the chapters on Peking, America, and Scandinavia. In Buckley's Great Cities of the Middle Ages (Routledge, 1853), the author thanked "my literary friend and coadjutor, Kenneth R. H. Mackenzie" for contributing the chapters on the cities of Spain. In Buckley's The Dawnings of Distinguished Men (Routledge, 1853), the author acknowledged "I am again a grateful debtor to the kindness of my friend Kenneth R. H. Mackenzie, Esq., whose Memoir of Thomas Chatterton forms one of its most interesting chapters." ("As his taste differed from that of children of his age, his dispositions were also different," Mackenzie, 19, wrote of the dreamy 18th century romantic poet and document forger who had committed suicide in London at the age of 18. "Instead of the thoughtless levity of childhood he possessed the gravity, pensiveness, and melancholy of mature life.... some dark, doubtful ideas of the great Life had presented themselves, and his spirit was grappling with them in hard strife.")

In 1853, Routledge published Mackenzie's book Burmah and the Burmese, even as Mackenzie was busy helping Walter Savage Landor prepare a new edition of his Imaginary Conversations (Demosthenes to Eubulides: "We want surprise, as at our theaters; astonishment, as at the mysteries of Eleusis." Diogenes to Plato: "It is better to shake our heads and let nothing out of them than to be plain and explicit in matters of difficulty... for if we answer with ease, we may be... liable to the probation of every clown's knuckle.")

In 1854, Mackenzie translated, from the German, Friedrich Wagner's Schamyl and Circassia (the title page noting Mackenzie had already, at age 20, been appointed a Fellow of the Society of Antiquaries of London and a Member of the Royal Asiatic Society of Great Britain). ("[T]he deeds of this remarkable man [ Imam Shamil ]... have filled his enemies as well as his friends with astonishment and admiration... Civilization such as we have around us now, leads inevitably to heartlessness.")

In 1855, Mackenzie translated, from the German, J. W. Wolf's Fairy Tales Collected in the Odenwald (Routledge). Between October 1858 and January 1859, at his own expense, Mackenzie published four issues of The Biological Review: A Monthly Repertory of the Science of Life. In 1859, Routledge published Master Tyll Owlglass: His Marvellous Adventures and Rare Conceits, Mackenzie's translation of the medieval prankster story "Till Eulenspiegel", published in the U.S. in 1860 by Ticknor & Fields. ("[T]he era of its [original] publication was rife with magicians, astrologers, and alchymists... Cornelius Agrippa very shortly afterwards found it necessary to protest against the abuse of such subjects in his treatise 'Of the Uncertainty and Vanity of the Sciences and Arts'... Johannes Trithemius was then Abbot of the Benedictine Monastery of Spanheim... but true to its mission of a folkbook, filled with the manners and customs of its time, [this story of ] Owlglass is thoroughly worldly and, for us, therefore, possesses greater interest and value.")

In 1861, Mackenzie traveled to Paris to meet the French occultist Eliphas Levi (Alphonse Louis Constant). In 1854, Mackenzie had met the American Rosicrucian Paschal Beverly Randolph who, in Paris in 1861, was newly appointed Supreme Grand Master for the Western World of the Fraternitas Rosae Crucis. In 1864, when Robert Wentworth Little found some old Rosicrucian rituals written in German in the storerooms of London's Freemason's Hall, he immediately turned to Mackenzie to help him whip these up into an esoteric order. Thinking that Mackenzie, a friend of the likes of Paschal Beverly Randolph and Eliphas Levi, had – as Mackenzie himself had claimed – been initiated into a German Rosicrucian fraternity when he lived in Vienna, Little believed Mackenzie had the “authority” to found the new, “authentic” esoteric society. In 1866, with Mackenzie's help, Little founded the Rosicrucian Society of England, the Societas Rosicruciana in Anglia. The main leaders of the new organization were Little, William Wynn Westcott, William Robert Woodman, and Samuel Liddell MacGregor Mathers (Westcott, Woodman, and Mathers would later be "the founding Chiefs" of the "Hermetic Order of the Golden Dawn").

According to a report of The Gentleman's Magazine, in May 1863, Mackenzie read to the Society of Antiquaries of London an "interesting paper" on "the 'History of the Horn book' illustrated by specimens from his own collection and by photographs and woodcuts from other collections." At the time, Mackenzie was preparing for the publication of a book on the subject. The publisher, in advance of the publication, had set in type and printed the title page; only this page was ever printed. As for "the paper" read before the Society of Antiquaries, The Gentleman’s Magazine reported, it "shewed considerable research, and was listened to with much interest."

In 1870 in London, James Hogg & Son published Mackenzie's translation of Johann Georg Ludwig Hesekiel’s Life Of Bismarck (republished in the U.S. in 1877 as Bismarck: His Authentic Biography; Profusely Illustrated by Distinguished Artists, with a new introduction by Bayard Taylor).

In 1872, the year of his marriage, seven pages of a manuscript, "Zythogala; or, Borne by the Sea: An International Romance of the Nineteenth Century By K. R. H. Mackenzie. London & Paris: Published by Authority of The Cosmological Society; Philadelphia: Mackenzie & Co. Chestnut Street; Leipsig: ‘Als Manuskript Gedruct’ Tauchnitz, 1872. Entered according to Act of Congress in the year 1872 by Robert Shelton Mackenzie of Philadelphia," made their way into the formal holdings of the British Library. The book was never published, but to this day the incomplete manuscript – just the first seven pages – remain on a shelf at the British Library (and nowhere else). ["One of the queerest mixtures to be used as a beverage to be found anywhere is zythogala, a mixture of milk and beer."]

Though known as something of an eccentric, "one of the most companionable of persons" when sober, but mean-spirited and harshly critical when under the influence of ale (in Vienna he had become very fond of both Vienna-style red ale and the beers of Munich, Germany), with no known source of income (apparently he had developed a system of astrological prediction of horse race winners that seemingly never produced any actual winnings), in 1872 Mackenzie married Alexandrina Aydon.

In 1873, Mackenzie's friend and mentor Frederick Hockley wrote of him, "I have the utmost reluctance even to refer to Mr. Kenneth Mackenzie. I made his acquaintance about 15 or 16 years since. I found him then a very young man who having been educated in Germany possessed a thorough knowledge of German and French and his translations having been highly praised by the press, exceedingly desirous of investigating the Occult Sciences, and when sober one of the most companionable persons I ever met."

In October 1874, a publisher's prospectus was issued for Mackenzie's Royal Masonic Cyclopaedia. In mid-August 1875, Mackenzie wrote a friend that “when this book is finished, I shall, very likely, run over to Canada. My father in law Harrison Aydon is carrying all before him and I am in correspondence with my cousin Alexander Mackenzie the Premier [of Canada]." Mackenzie corrected the last of the Cyclopaedia proofs early in 1877.

In 1881, Mackenzie edited the early issues of the Masonic periodical Kneph. He planned a book called The Game of Tarot: Archaeologically and Symbolically Considered, which was announced but not published. Another new order, the "Order of Light", was launched in 1882, followed by Mackenzie's creation of an even more esoteric Masonic organization called the "Society of Eight," formed especially "for the study of Alchemy." In 1883, John Hogg published The Shoes of Fortune, and Other Fairy Tales by Hans Christian Andersen, "with a biographical sketch of Andersen by Kenneth R. H. Mackenzie, LLD., original English editor of Andersen's 'In Sweden'."

== Death and posthumously discovered works ==
Kenneth R. H. Mackenzie died on 3 July 1886, shortly before his fifty-third birthday.

In August 1887, the Cipher Manuscripts were bought from Mackenzie's wife and transferred, via A. F. A. Woodford, to William Wynn Westcott. Although the Cipher Manuscripts appeared to be in Mackenzie's handwriting, Westcott made elaborate claims concerning Mackenzie's having received permission to open, in Britain, an order that was said to have originated in Germany, the Hermetic Order of the Golden Dawn. The Cipher Manuscripts were used to found the order.
