= Societas Rosicruciana =

Masonic Rosicrucian order

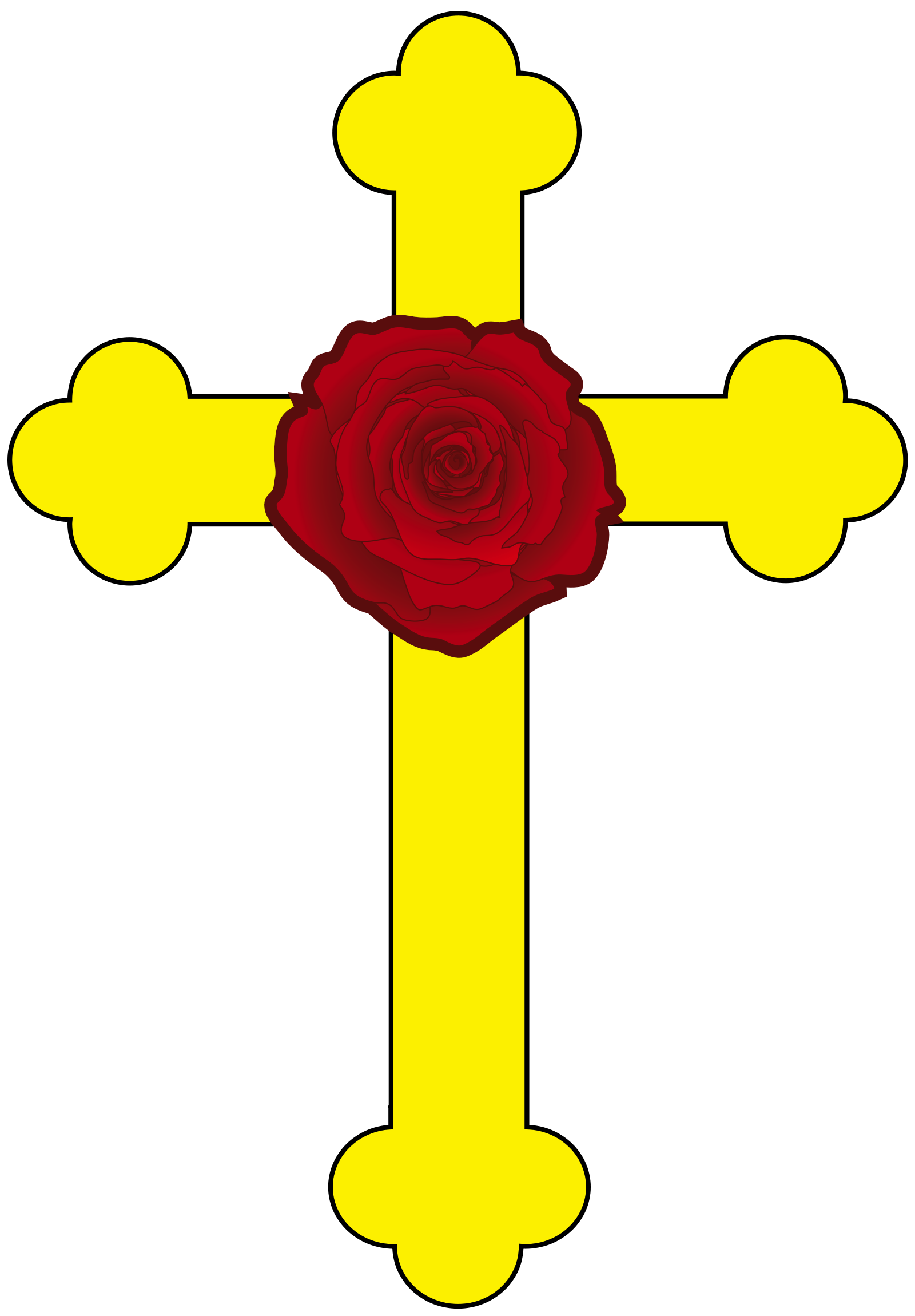
- The Rose Cross
- Abbreviation: SR
- Members: Christian Master Masons

The Societas Rosicruciana (or Rosicrucian Society) is a Rosicrucian order which limits its membership to Christian Master Masons. The order was founded in Scotland, but now exists in Scotland, England, Canada, Portugal, and the United States. While a prospective member must be a Trinitarian Christian Master Mason in good standing with a Grand Lodge that is recognized by the Grand Lodge of the jurisdiction in which the Society meets, the various Societies have no other Masonic links, ties, or official recognition. Additionally, in some jurisdictions, membership is by invitation only. As the Society offers assistance to all its members in working out problems of nature and science, it functions in some respects as a research society.

== History ==
The Societas Rosicruciana claims a link to the original Rosicrucian Brotherhood. It bases its teachings on those found in the Fama and Confessio Fraternitatis, texts published in Germany in the early 17th century, along with other similar publications from the same time.

There are a number of Societas Rosicrucianas throughout the world:

- Societas Rosicruciana in Scotia (SRIS; Scotland)
- Societas Rosicruciana in Anglia (SRIA; England)
- Societas Rosicruciana in Civitatibus Foederatis (SRICF; United States)
- Societas Rosicruciana in Canada (SRIC; Canada)
- Societas Rosicruciana in Lusitania (SRIL; Portugal)

=== Societas Rosicruciana in Scotia (SRIS) ===
The first Societas Rosicruciana was located in Scotland, known as the Societas Rosicruciana in Scotia (SRIS).

As of January 2014, there are seven Colleges in Scotland, three in Australia, one in Hong Kong, and one in Finland.

The Colleges in Scotland are the Metropolitan College (Edinburgh), the East of Scotland College (Dundee), Abraxas College (Falkirk), the West of Scotland College (Glasgow), the Muse Coila College (Stewarton, Ayrshire), the Inverness College (Inverness), and the Semper Discens College (Aberdeen).

The Colleges in Australia are the Aurora Australis College (Petersham, NSW), the Hunter Valley College (New Lambton, NSW), and the Huon Pine College (Launceston, Tasmania).

The Hong Kong College is in Hong Kong. The Aurora Borealis College is in Seinäjoki, Finland.

=== Societas Rosicruciana in Anglia (SRIA) ===
The Societas Rosicruciana in Anglia was founded in 1867 and derived from the SRIS following the admission of William James Hughan and Robert Wentworth Little into that order. The two of them were advanced quickly in Scotland and granted a warrant to form a Society in England. The formation meeting took place on June 1, 1867 in Aldermanbury, London, with Robert Wentworth Little elected Supreme Magus.

Most Colleges in Australia belong to provinces within the Societas Rosicruciana in Anglia (SRIA).

=== Societas Rosicruciana in Civitatibus Foederatis (SRICF) ===
The Societas Rosicruciana in Civitatibus Foederatis is a Rosicrucian Society based in the United States. Its history begins with the formation of a Grand High Council on April 21, 1880. Its official consecration occurred on September 21, 1880, by three Colleges chartered by the Societas Rosicruciana in Scotia. High Grade senior Christian Freemasons in the United States in search of the Classical Rosicrucian Society for Masons in the United Kingdom became interested in organizing a similar body in the United States. They did so under Scotland's authority (Societas Rosicruciana in Scotia) with the help of Most Worthy Charles Matier of the SRIS, as early as 1873. This effort died out two years later under the care of R.W. Frater George S. Blackie VIII and was then re-chartered by the SRIS in 1878. Dr. Jonathon J. French was a IX grade head of the Rosicrucian Society of the United States, and opened the Matier Royal Provincial College with a charter from Lord Inverurie, Earl of Kintore and Supreme Magus of the SRIS. The college was named after Charles Fitzgerald Matier, the first Supreme Magus of SRIS, who served in 1876. Harold Van Buren Voorhis insists that the Illinois College under Dr. French was never truly active, and it certainly was short-lived as Dr. French died an untimely death in 1879. Harold Voorhis also insisted that Frater Stodart Blackie's early charter in New York had been nothing more than an unsubstantiated rumor. It has since been established as historical fact.

In 1878, a group of senior U.S. Masons (Daniel Sutter and Charles W. Parker) led by Charles E. Meyer (1839–1908) of Pennsylvania traveled to England and on July 25, 1878 were initiated into the grade of Zelator at Yorkshire College at Sheffield. They applied for a charter, but getting no response, turned to Scotland and received a charter from the college in Edinburgh in 1879. Scotland's Society is actually the oldest, as Walter Spencer is recorded as having been initiated into the SRIS by Anthony O’Neal Haye in 1857, and there are documents in the SRIA archives that show that both Robert Wentworth Little and William J. Hughan were initiated in 1866 and 1867 by Anthony O’Neal Haye, Magus Max, Ros. Soc. Scot., with H.H.M. Bairnfathur signing as Secretary. The Societas Rosicruciana in Anglia was formed in England in 1866 by Robert Wentworth Little. The SRIA later felt the need to charter the current SRIS on October 24, 1873.

A second charter was granted by the SRIS for a college in New York, and Fratres from Philadelphia and New York met in Philadelphia on April 21, 1880 and formed a High Council, then known as the SRRCA or the Societas Rosicrucianae Reipublica Confoedera America, later changed to the Society of Rosicrucians in the USA by Most Worthy Frater Shryock in his capacity as Supreme Magus, and then properly Latinized in 1934 by and at the suggestion of Dr. William Moseley Brown under the regime of Most Worthy Frater Hamilton. Brown composed the name (Societas Rosicruciana In Civitatibus Foederatis) himself and submitted it on January 17, 1934. The SRICF has operated continuously since its formation in the 19th Century, and is thriving today with an upsurge of young Masons being invited into its ranks with great enthusiasm and demonstrated scholarship.

Membership is by invitation only and predicated on regular mainstream Masonic affiliation as well as a profession of Christian faith. Membership was initially restricted to 36 members per College, but this was changed in 1908 by MW Thomas Shryock to 72 members per college. The See of the High Council is in Washington, D.C. The SRICF is in amity with the SRIS (Scotia) and the SRIA (Anglia) as well as the SRIC (Canada) and has helped the cause of Rosicruciana by empowering High Councils in their own sovereignty around the World. They are the SRIL in Lusitania (Portugal), SRIG in Gallia (France) and the SRIR (Romania).

The society issues an annual journal known as Ad Lucem composed of academic articles on things related to Rosicrucianism and esoteric streams of Christian Mysteries. There is also an annual report, The Rosicrucian Fama. Many of the Colleges have their own individual organs which are produced quarterly as well as annually. The governing body of the Society is known since 1911 (having dropped ‘Grand’ from its title) as the High Council, which is composed of Fratres of the Third Order (IX and VIII), plus any College Celebrant not a member of the Third Order. The head of the Society is the Supreme Magus, who was elected ad vitam up until circa 1991, when the constitution of the Society was changed to provide that the Supreme Magus is elected each triennium. Unlike the SRIA in England, a Chief Adept in the SRICF does not have regional powers, but rather is in charge of an individual College. Typically there is but one College per state, exceptions having been made for both New York and California due to their size and population.

==== List of Supreme Magi of the SRICF ====
- Charles E. Meyer, 1880–1908
- Thomas J. Shryock, 1908–1918
- Eugene A. Holton, 1918–1927
- Frederick W. Hamilton, 1927–1940
- Arthur D. Prince, 1940–1950
- Harold Van Buren Voorhis, 1950–1979
- Laurence E. Eaton, 1979–1984
- Henry Emerson, 1984–1986
- William G. Peacher, 1986-1992
- Joseph S. Lewis, 1992-1995
- James M. Willson, Jr., 1995-1998
- Thurman C. Pace, Jr., 1998-2007
- William H. Koon, II, 2007–2019
- Jeffrey N. Nelson, 2019–Present

==== Notes ====
KGC~ Knight Grand Crosses are awarded to IX grade Magi for exemplary effort in the work of the Society and Rosicrucianism in general.

=== Societas Rosicruciana in Canada (S.R.I.C.) ===
The Societas Rosicruciana in Canadiensis was first mentioned in a declaration dated May 31, 1876, but it was not formally constituted (by a Col. McLeod Moore, through his acquaintance with John Yarker) until September 19 of that year. Most of the membership came from the town of Maitland, Ontario. The society constituted a High Council exactly one year later, but the Society went into abeyance at some point after 1889.

In 1936, Ontario College was created via a charter from SRICF. Manly Palmer Hall's father, E.H.D. Hall, a member of Canada's first Rosicrucian Society, was voted a charter member of the Ontario College. Due to possible jurisdictional issues, rather than procure a charter from SRIA or SRIS, a Canadian High Council was formed on June 29, 1997, and the SRIC is now an independent body.

=== Societas Rosicruciana in Lusitania (S.R.I.L.) ===
The Societas Rosicruciana in Lusitania (SRIL) was constituted on October 5, 2002 in Portugal. Its High Council was empowered by the Societas Rosicruciana in Civitatibus Foederatis (USA) and the first Supreme Magus, Pinto Coelho, was consecrated by the M.W. Supreme Magus Thurman Pace Jr (SRICF). Membership is by invitation only, and predicated on regular mainstream Masonic affiliation as well as a profession of Trinitarian Christian faith. Membership is restricted to 72 members per College, and they are called Fraters. The SRIL is in amity with all regular Rosicrucian Societas: Societas Rosicruciana in Scotia (SRIS), Societas Rosicruciana in Anglia (SRIA) and, Societas Rosicruciana in Civitas Foederatis ,(SRICF). The various Societies have no other Masonic links, ties, or official recognition. The Societas Rosicruciana in Lusitania has, through mutual help and fraternal encouragement, help to unravel the great problems of Life, to discover the Secrets of Nature, to study the system of Philosophy taught by the Fratres of the Rose-Cross since the year 1440, and to seek the meaning and symbolism of all the heritage of Wisdom, Arts and Literature of the ancient world. The governing body of the Society is the High Council which is composed of Fratres of the Third Order (IX and VIII) plus any College Celebrant not a member of the Third Order. The head of the Society is titled the Supreme Magus, and was elected ad vitam, but according to the revised constitution of 2019 the SRIL Supreme Magus is now elected for 3 years, renewable while having the support of the members of the High College Fraters. The basic structures of Rosicrucian Societies are called Colleges. At present, there are Colleges under SRIL's jurisdiction in the North and Central/South of Portugal Provinces and in the North, Central and South of Italy Provinces. There are currently petitions for the constitution of a new College in the Center of Portugal. The Supreme Magus has his own College, called the Metropolitan College. Cavaleiro Grande Cruz (CGC) — Knight Grand Cross is the SRIL's most important High Council award. It is awarded to Supreme Magi of brother jurisdictions and IX grade Magi members for outstanding services. The SRIL bi-annual publication is called Demanda.

== Structure and governance ==
The Order is subdivided into three smaller orders, each with its own governance. The various orders confer a total of nine degrees, here called grades.

=== First Order ===
Members of the 1st Order (Frater (singular) Fratres (plural)) meet in a College, which is equivalent to a Lodge. A College is empowered to confer the first four degrees of the Society, also called the Learning Grades.

- Grade I - Zelator
- Grade II - Theoricus
- Grade III - Practicus
- Grade IV - Philosophus

A minimum of six months must elapse between the receipt of each grade. The emphasis on the work of the society is learning; therefore every member is encouraged to deliver a paper of their own work on some topic of interest in open college.

=== Second Order ===
This is equivalent to a Masonic Provincial Grand Lodge, and is headed by a Chief Adept and his deputy (Suffragan) who have jurisdiction over all of the first order Colleges within the Province.

The Chief Adept is empowered to confer three further Grades at this level to deserving Fratres of Grade IV who have been members of the Society for a minimum of four years.

- Grade V - Adeptus Minor
- Grade VI - Adeptus Major
- Grade VII - Adeptus Exemptus

A minimum of one year must elapse between the receipt of grades at this level. A member can only serve as the Celebrant (Master) of a College of the First Order after receiving the Grade of Adeptus Exemptus.

=== Third Order ===
This is equivalent to a Grand Lodge, and is headed by a Supreme Magus, Senior Substitute Magus and Junior Substitute Magus.

Members of the second order who have given service to the society and been selected by the Supreme Magus for such advancement may be awarded two further Grades.

- Grade VIII - Magister
- Grade IX - Magus

== Influences ==
=== Hermetic Order of the Golden Dawn ===
In 1888, three members of SRIA, William Robert Woodman, William Wynn Westcott, and Samuel Liddell MacGregor Mathers, formed the Hermetic Order of the Golden Dawn, which removed the restriction on membership, allowing non-Christians, non-Freemasons, and women to join. A great deal of the SRIA structure survived in the new order, which went on to greatly influence the modern Western occult revival in the 20th century.

=== Societas Rosicruciana in America (SRIAm) ===
Due to the fragmentary nature of Rosicrucian orders, there are a number of historical Rosicrucian societies with similar names that either no longer have a Masonic connection, or have gone dormant: The SRIA (A for "America") was chartered by the SRIA (in England) in Philadelphia in 1878. It reformed in 1889 as Societas Rosicruciana in the United States (SRIUS), and reformed again as SRIA in 1912. In 1916 the order began admitting women, and its charter was revoked. As of 2007 it remained active but without any formal Masonic ties.

In 1879, a College was established in Philadelphia, Pa., under warrant from the High Council of Scotia (Scotland) by a number of Americans who visited England and received their degrees from York College of the Societas Rosicruciana in Anglia. Colleges were established soon after 1879 in New York, Boston, and Burlington, Vt., and were recognized in full by the S.R.I. Anglia; they organized their own High Council, and the body thus constituted became known as the Societatis Rosicrucianae in the United States, admitting only 32nd degree Masons.

== See also ==
- Societas Rosicruciana in Civitatibus Fœderatis - USA
- Ancient Mystical Order Rosae Crucis
- Theosophy
