= Cipher Manuscripts =

Collection of 60 folios regarding magical initiation rituals

The Cipher Manuscripts are a collection of 60 folios containing the structural outline of a series of magical initiation rituals corresponding to the spiritual elements of Earth, Air, Water and Fire. The "occult" materials in the Manuscripts are a compendium of the classical magical theory and symbolism known in the Western world up until the middle of the 19th century, combined to create an encompassing model of the Western mystery tradition, and arranged into a syllabus of a graded course of instruction in magical symbolism. It was used as the structure for the Hermetic Order of the Golden Dawn, after the manuscripts came into the possession of prominent SRIA members.

== Description ==
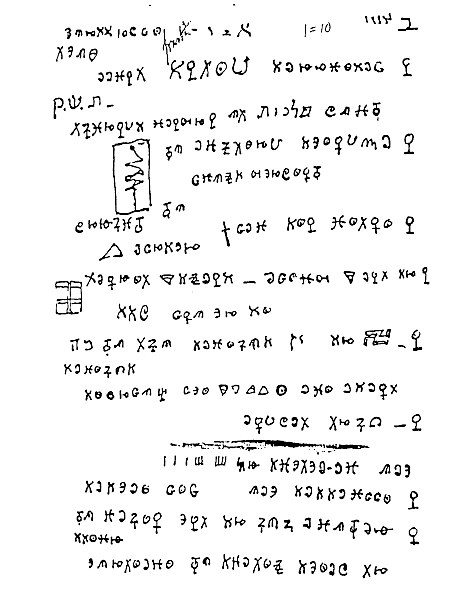
Folio 13 of the Cipher MMS.

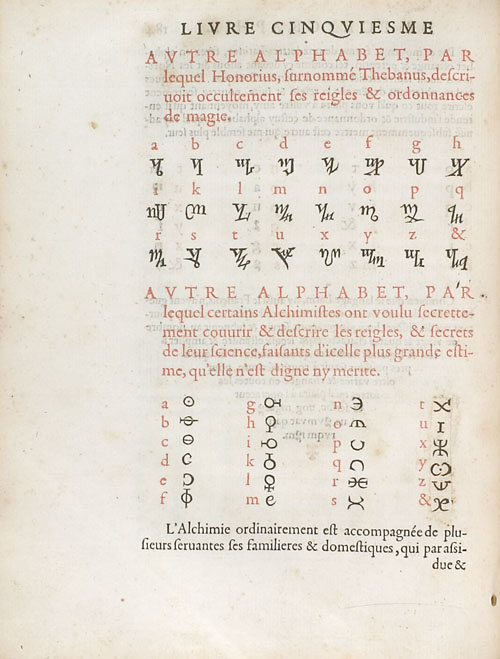
The cipher used in the manuscripts, shown in a 1561 edition of Trithemius' Polygraphia. Another cipher known as "Theban" is given above it.

The folios are drawn in black ink on cotton paper watermarked 1809. The text is plain English written from right to left in a simple substitution cryptogram. It uses the Trithemius Cipher, developed in the 16th century. Numerals are substituted by Hebrew letters – Alef=1, Bet=2, etc. Crude drawings of diagrams, magical implements and tarot cards are interspersed in the text. One final page transcribes into French and Latin.

The Ciphers contain the outlines of a series of graded rituals and the syllabus for a course of instruction in Qabalah and Hermetic magic, including Astrology, occult tarot, Geomancy and Alchemy. It also contains several diagrams and crude drawings of various ritual implements. The Cipher Manuscripts are the original source upon which the rituals and the knowledge lectures of the Hermetic Order of the Golden Dawn were based.

The actual material itself described in the Manuscript is of known origins. Hermeticism, Alchemy, Qabalah, Astrology and Tarot were certainly not unknown to 19th century scholars of the Magical arts; the Cipher is a compendium of previously known Magical traditions. The basic structure of the rituals and the names of the Grades are similar to those of the Rosicrucian orders Societas Rosicruciana in Anglia and the German 'Orden der Gold- und Rosenkreuzer'.

== Discovery ==
William Wynn Westcott, a London Deputy Coroner, member of the S.R.I.A. and one of the founders of the Golden Dawn, claimed to have received the manuscripts through Rev. A. F. A. Woodford, who was a colleague of noted Masonic scholar Kenneth R. H. Mackenzie. The papers were to have been secured by Westcott after Mackenzie's death in 1886, among the belongings of Mackenzie's mentor, the late Frederick Hockley, and by September 1887, they were decoded by Westcott.

The Manuscripts also contained an address of an aged adept named Fräulein (Miss) Anna Sprengel in Germany. According to Westcott, he wrote to Sprengel inquiring about the contents of the papers. Sprengel responded, and after accepting the requests of Westcott and his partner and fellow Mason Samuel Liddell MacGregor Mathers, issued them a Charter to operate a Lodge of the Order in England. Westcott's first Golden Dawn temple was the Isis-Urania Temple, styled "No. 3." Temple No. 1 would have been Fräulein Sprengel's lodge, and No. 2 was supposedly an abortive attempt at a lodge by some unnamed persons in London (possibly a reference to Mackenzie and other S.R.I.A. members some years earlier). According to Ronald Decker and Michael Dummett, the page of the Cipher Manuscripts mentioning Anna Sprengel was almost certainly not part of the original. They argue that Westcott invented Sprengel in order to give the Golden Dawn a more plausible connection to ancient esoteric wisdom.

== Controversy ==
Considerable controversy surrounds the origins of the Cipher Manuscripts. Westcott claimed Sprengel was a German Adept of the 'Gold- und Rosenkreuzer' Order who wrote letters to Westcott and Mathers granting them permission to establish the Order in England. Mathers later claimed that only the letters were forgeries, but it seems unlikely that Westcott or Mathers wrote the Manuscripts themselves, as some believe.

There is considerable doubt among scholars that Westcott's story is accurate. In particular, the age and contents of the documents have been the subject of much controversy. In particular, the manuscript contains a reference to the ancient Egyptian Book of the Dead which was not understood by scholars before the deciphering of the Rosetta Stone in 1822, and not published in translation until 1842.

== Possible sources ==
A variety of theories exist as to the real source of the Cipher Manuscript. Some of the more common ones include:

- Westcott and Mathers created the Manuscripts and letters themselves, and created the origin myth of "Rosicrucian Adepts" to give credibility to their new Order.
- Mason and clergyman A.F.A. Woodford found the Cipher Manuscript in a secondhand bookstall on Wellington Road in London, and gave it to his friend Westcott to be decoded.
- The Sprengel letters were a forgery by Westcott, but the Manuscripts were written by Kenneth Mackenzie and/or other scholars of the S.R.I.A. (to which Westcott, Mathers and Woodman belonged as early as 1881). Fräulein Sprengel was a legend invented by Westcott to give lineage to the newly formed order. Westcott created the mythology of the Cipher Manuscripts' origins, knowing that a more esoteric source would carry weight with occultists of the era.
- There was no German order; the first Golden Dawn temple was a project of a secret group within the S.R.I.A. called the "Society of Eight". (By the time Westcott "discovered" the Manuscripts, all the members of the Society were deceased.) Fräulein Sprengel did not really exist, but the Manuscript itself has true antiquarian origins, traceable to Johann Falk and passed through the hands of Francis Barrett, Eliphas Levi, and eventually to Mackenzie, Woodford and the S.R.I.A. (and the Society of Eight).
- There really was a German Rosicrucian order, sometimes referred to as the "Gold und Rosenkreutz", and it already had a branch in London, founded around 1810. Mackenzie was a member of this German order, into which he had been initiated by Count Apponyi of Hungary, and obtained the rituals described in the Cipher from them.
- The rituals in the Manuscripts were written by Baron Edward Bulwer-Lytton, honorary patron of the S.R.I.A. and author of an occult novel called Zanoni - A Strange Story, or by Frederick Hockley, the famous Rosicrucian seer and transcriber of occult manuscripts, and thence passed to Mackenzie.
- The Cipher Manuscript was legitimate, and the Golden Dawn is a valid offspring of an older Jewish order in Bavaria called Loge zur aufgehenden Morgenröthe, which translates to "Lodge of the Approaching Morning Light" or "Lodge of the Rising Dawn". This Order was founded to allow German Jews to conduct Masonic-style lodges since, at the time, Jews were banned from participation in Freemasonry.

In any case, no evidence has ever proven the existence of Fräulein Sprengel or her Lodge. (By Westcott's account, the other members of the German order supposedly objected to Sprengel's chartering of the Isis-Urania Lodge, and all further communications were cut off after she died.) The Isis-Urania Charter was written and signed only by Westcott, Mathers and William Robert Woodman. There are letters by Mackenzie that indicate the 'Society of Eight' existed, but nothing that describes what they actually taught or practised. The symbolism and philosophy contained in the Cipher Manuscripts are not very different from that of high-degree Freemasonry and Rosicrucianism, and Mackenzie and the members of the S.R.I.A. were capable-enough esoteric scholars, with access to works on the Qabalah, Hermeticism, and Egyptology in Masonic libraries, to have combined it all into the form followed by the Golden Dawn.

However, there is no conclusive evidence to prove any of the proposed origins of the Cipher Manuscripts. Questions about the authenticity of the Manuscripts and the authority of the Isis-Urania Charter contributed to the first great schism of the Golden Dawn Order in 1900. In 1901, with the dissensions in the Golden Dawn, the poet W. B. Yeats, a member of the Order, privately published a pamphlet titled Is the Order of R.R. et A. C. to Remain a Magical Order? The true origins of the Cipher Manuscripts remain a mystery to this day.

== See also ==
- Esotericism in Germany and Austria
