= Tarot card reading =

Using tarot cards to perform divination

Tarot card reading is a form of divination whereby practitioners use tarot cards to purportedly gain insight into the past, present or future. The process typically begins with formulation of a question, followed by drawing and interpreting cards to uncover meaning. A traditional tarot deck consists of 78 cards, which can be split into two groups, the Major Arcana and Minor Arcana. French-suited playing cards (Marseille tarot) can also be used; as can any card system with suits assigned to identifiable elements (e.g., air, earth, fire, and water).

== History ==
The first written references to tarot packs occurred between 1440 and 1450 in northern Italy, for example in Milan and Ferrara, when additional cards with allegorical illustrations were added to the common four-suit pack. These new packs were called carte da trionfi, triumph packs, and the additional cards were simply known as trionfi, which became "trumps" in English.

One of the earliest references to tarot triumphs appears around c. 1450–1470 mentioned by a Dominican preacher in a sermon condemning dice, playing cards and 'triumphs'. References to the tarot as a social plague or as exempt from the bans that affected other games continued throughout the 16th and 17th centuries, but there are no indications that the cards were used for anything but games. As philosopher and tarot historian Michael Dummett noted, "it was only in the 1780s, when the practice of fortune-telling with regular playing cards had been well established for at least two decades, that anyone began to use the tarot pack for cartomancy."

Claims by the early French occultists that tarot cards had esoteric links to ancient Egypt, the Kabbalah, Indic Tantra, or the I Ching have been frequently repeated by authors on card divination. However, scholarly research reveals that there is no evidence of any significant use of tarot cards for divination until the late 18th century as it was believed to be invented in Italy in the early 15th century. In fact, historians have described western views of the Tarot pack as "the subject of the most successful propaganda campaign ever launched... An entire false history and false interpretation of the Tarot pack was concocted by the occultists; and it is all but universally believed".

The belief in the divinatory meaning of the cards is closely associated to the notion of their occult properties, a view commonly held in early modern Europe propagated by prominent Protestant Christian clerics and Freemasons.

From its uptake as an instrument of divination in 18th-century France, the cards went on to be used in hermeneutic, magical, mystical, semiotic, and psychological practices. It was used by Romani people while telling fortunes, as a Jungian psychological apparatus for tapping into "absolute knowledge in the unconscious", a tool for archetypal analysis, and even for facilitating the Jungian process of individuation.

=== Court de Gébelin ===
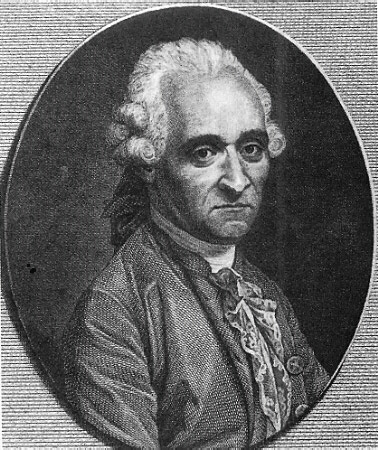
Court de Gébelin

Many involved in occult and divinatory practices attempt to trace the tarot to ancient Egypt, divine hermetic wisdom, and the mysteries of Isis.

The first was Antoine Court de Gébelin, a French clergyman, who wrote that after seeing a group of women playing cards he had the idea that tarot was not merely a game of cards but was in fact of ancient Egyptian origin, of mystical Qabalistic import, and of deep divine significance. Court de Gébelin published a dissertation on the origins of the symbolism in the tarot in volume VIII of the work Le Monde primitif in 1781. He believed that the tarot represented ancient Egyptian Theology, including Isis, Osiris, and Typhon. For example, he thought the card he knew as the Papesse and known in occult circles today as the High Priestess represented Isis. He also related four tarot cards to the four Christian Cardinal virtues: Temperance, Justice, Strength and Prudence. He related The Tower to a Greek fable about avarice.

Although the ancient Egyptian language had not yet been deciphered, Court de Gébelin asserted the name "Tarot" came from the Egyptian words Tar, 'path' or 'road', and the word Ro, Ros, or Rog, meaning 'king' or 'royal', and that the word literally translated to 'the Royal Road of Life'. Subsequent research by Egyptologists found nothing in the Egyptian language to support Court de Gébelin's etymologies. Despite this lack of any evidence, the belief that the tarot cards are linked to the Egyptian Book of Thoth continues to the present day. (Note: See, for example, Alexander and Shannon (2019), who describe as "compelling" theories linking tarot cards to ancient Egypt and the Book of Thoth.)

The actual source of the occult tarot can be traced to two articles in volume eight, one written by Court de Gébelin and one written by M. le C. de M.***, (Note: The asterisks and the abbreviations are the actual way Court de Gébelin refers to the second essay.) who has been identified as Major General Louis-Raphaël-Lucrèce de Fayolle, Comte de Mellet. This second essay is "considerably more impressive" than de Gébelin's, albeit "as full of assertions with no basis in truth", and has been even more influential than Court de Gébelin's. The author makes no acknowledgement of de Gébelin and, although he agrees with all his main conclusions, he also contradicts de Gébelin over such details as the meaning of the word "Tarot" and in how the cards spread across Europe. Moreover, he takes de Gébelin's speculations even further, agreeing with him about the mystical origins of the tarot in ancient Egypt, but making several additional, and influential, statements that continue to influence mass understanding of the occult tarot even to this day. He made the first statements proposing that the tarot was "The Book of Thoth" and made the first association of tarot with cartomancy. Meanwhile Court de Gébelin was the first to imply the existence of a connection between the Tarot and Romani people, (Note: Miscalled by him "Bohemians". At that time, Romani people were thought to have come from Egypt, until later research established their origin in India.) although this connection did not become well established in the public consciousness until other French authors such as Boiteau d'Ambly and Jean-Alexandre Vaillant began in the 1850s to promote the theory that tarot cards had been brought to Europe by the Romani. In fact, there is virtually no evidence that Romani people used any form of playing cards for telling fortunes until the 20th century. (Note: Despite this, Alexander and Shannon (2019), still claim that "Romani people may have carried the cards to Europe.")

=== Etteilla ===
Cartomancer Etteilla, the pseudonym of Jean-Baptiste Alliette, was the first to assign divinatory meanings to tarot cards. Etteilla devised a method of tarot divination in 1783, and published his cartomantic treatise comparing the cards to the Book of Thoth in 1785. Etteilla established the Société des Interprètes du Livre de Thot, the first society for tarot cartomancy, in 1788.

He promoted the Grand Etteilla deck as the first corrected tarot (supposedly fixing errors that resulted from misinterpretation and corruption through the mists of antiquity); he created the first Egyptian tarot to be used exclusively for cartomancy, and published Dictionnaire synonimique du Livre de Thot, which "systematically tabulated all the possible meanings which each card could bear, when upright and reversed." Etteilla expanded tarot lore by describing the deck as a repository of the wisdom of Hermes Trismegistus, a book of eternal medicine, an account of the creation of the world, and claimed the first copy of the tarot was imprinted on leaves of gold.

In his 1980 book, The Game of Tarot, Michael Dummett argued that Etteilla was attempting to supplant Court de Gébelin as the author of the occult tarot. (Note: Etteilla's "eagerness to establish his claim to priority over de Gébelin...") Etteilla in fact claimed to have been involved with tarot longer than Court de Gébelin. (Note: Etteilla repeatedly claimed that he had studied the Tarot pack "from 1757 to 1765...")

=== Marie Anne Lenormand ===
Mlle Marie-Anne Adelaide Lenormand outshone even Etteilla and was the first cartomancer to people in high places, through her claims to be the personal confidant of Empress Josephine, Napoleon and other notables. Lenormand used both regular playing cards, in particular the Piquet pack, as well as tarot cards likely derived from the Tarot de Marseille. Following her death in 1843, several different cartomantic decks were published in her name, including the Grand Jeu de Mlle Lenormand, based on the standard 52-card deck, first published in 1845, and the Petit Lenormand, a 36-card deck derived from the German game Das Spiel der Hoffnung, first published around 1850.

=== Éliphas Lévi ===
The concept of the cards as a mystical key was extended by Éliphas Lévi. Lévi (whose actual name was Alphonse-Louis Constant) was educated in the seminary of Saint-Sulpice, and was ordained as a deacon, but never became a priest. Michael Dummett noted that it is from Lévi's book Dogme et rituel that the "whole of the modern occultist movement stems." Lévi's magical theory was based on a concept he called the Astral Light and according to Dummett, he claimed to be the first to:

"have discovered intact and still unknown this key of all doctrines and all philosophies of the old world... without the tarot", he tells us, "the Magic of the ancients is a closed book...."

Lévi accepted Court de Gébelin's claims that the deck had an Egyptian origin, but rejected Etteilla's interpretation and rectification of the cards in favor of a reinterpretation of the Tarot de Marseille. He called it The Book of Hermes and claimed that the tarot was antique, existed before Moses, and was in fact a universal key of erudition, philosophy, and magic that could unlock Hermetic and Qabalistic concepts. According to Lévi, "An imprisoned person with no other book than the Tarot, if he knew how to use it, could in a few years acquire universal knowledge, and would be able to speak on all subjects with unequaled learning and inexhaustible eloquence."

According to Dummett, Lévi's notable contributions included the following:

- Lévi was the first to suggest that the Magus (Bagatto) was to be depicted in conjunction with the symbols of the four suits.
- Inspired by de Gébelin, Lévi associated the Hebrew alphabet with the Major Arcana (tarot trumps) and attributed an "onomantic astrology" system to the "ancient Hebrew Qabalists."
- Lévi linked the ten numbered cards in each suit to the ten sefiroth.
- He claimed the court cards represented stages of human life.
- He also claimed the four suits represented the Tetragrammaton.

=== French Tarot divination after Lévi ===
Occultists, magicians, and magi all the way down to the 21st century have cited Lévi as a defining influence. (Note: Waite (2005) made 34 references to Lévi in all, including references to five of Lévi's books in the bibliography.) Among the first to seemingly adopt Lévi's ideas was Jean-Baptiste Pitois. Pitois wrote two books under the name Paul Christian that referenced the tarot, L'Homme rouge des Tuileries (1863), and later Histoire de la magie, du monde surnaturel et de la fatalité à travers les temps et les peuples (1870). In them, Pitois repeated and extended the mythology of the tarot and changed the names for the trumps and the suits (see table below for a list of Pitois's modifications to the trumps). Batons (wands) became Scepters, Swords became Blades, and Coins became Shekels. (Note: Dummett (1980) singles out Pitois's writing as one of the worst examples of what he calls false ascription to be found in the occult literature.)

However, it was not until the late 1880s that Lévi's vision of the occult tarot truly began to bear fruit, as his ideas on the occult began to be propounded by various French and English occultists. In France, secret societies such as the French Theosophical Society (1884) and the Kabbalistic Order of the Rose-Cross (1888) served as the seeds for further developments in the occult tarot in France.

The French occultist Papus was one of the most prominent members of these societies, joining the Isis lodge of the French Theosophical Society in 1887 and becoming a founding member of the Kabbalistic Order of the Rose-Cross the next year. Among his 260 publications are two treatises on the use of tarot cards, Le Tarot des Bohémiens (1889), which attempted to formalize the method of using tarot cards in ceremonial magic first proposed by Lévi in his Clef des grands mysteries (1861), and Le Tarot divinatoire (1909), which focused on simpler divinatory uses of the cards.

Another founding member of the Kabbalistic Order of the Rose-Cross, the Marquis Stanislas de Guaita, met the amateur artist Oswald Wirth in 1887 and subsequently sponsored a production of Lévi's intended deck. Guided entirely by de Guaita, Wirth designed the first neo-occultist cartomantic deck (and first cartomantic deck not derived from Etteilla's Egyptian deck). Released in 1889 as Les 22 Arcanes du Tarot kabbalistique, it consisted of only the twenty-two major arcana and was revised under the title of Le Tarot des imagers du moyen âge in 1926. Wirth also released a book about his revised cards, which contained his own theories of the occult tarot under the same title in the year following.

Outside of the Kabbalistic Order, in 1888, French magus Ély Star published Les mystères de l'horoscope which mostly repeats Christian's modifications. Its primary contribution was the introduction of the terms 'Major Arcana' and 'Minor Arcana', and the numbering of the Crocodile (the Fool) XXII instead of 0.

=== The Hermetic Order of the Golden Dawn and its heirs ===
The late 1880s not only saw the spread of the occult tarot in France, but also its initial adoption in the English-speaking world. In 1886, Arthur Edward Waite published The Mysteries of Magic, a selection of Lévi's writings translated by Waite and the first significant treatment of the occult tarot to be published in England. However, it was only through the establishment of the Hermetic Order of the Golden Dawn in 1888 that the occult tarot was to become established as a tool in the English-speaking world.

Of the three founding members of the Golden Dawn, two, Samuel Liddell Mathers and William Wynn Westcott, published texts relating to the occult tarot prior to the founding of the order. Westcott is known to have made ink sketches of tarot trumps in or around 1886 and discussed the tarot in his treatise Tabula Bembina, sive Mensa Isiaca, published in 1887, while Mathers had published the first British work primarily focused on the tarot in his 1888 booklet entitled The Tarot: Its Occult Signification, Use in Fortune-Telling and Method of Play.

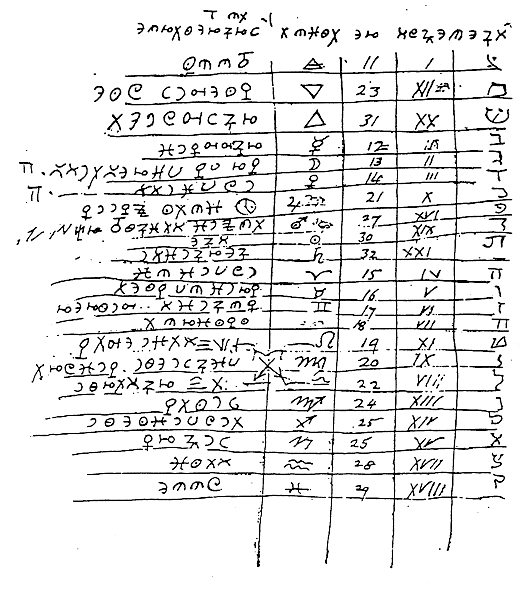
Folio 32 of the Cipher Manuscripts, which gives the correspondences for the Major Arcana

The tarot was also mentioned explicitly in the Cipher Manuscripts that served as the founding document of the Hermetic Order, both implicitly and in the form of a separate essay accompanying the manuscript. This essay was to serve as the basis for most of tarot interpretations by the Golden Dawn and its immediate successors, including such features as:

- placing The Fool before the other 21 trumps when determining the Qabalistic correspondence of the Major Arcana to the Hebrew alphabet
- attributing the Hebrew alphabet correspondences to pathways in the Tree of Life
- swapping the positions of the eighth and eleventh arcana (Justice and Strength), and
- reassigning Qabalistic planetary associations to accord with the re-ordered trumps.

The Golden Dawn also:

- renamed the suits of Batons and Coins to Wands and Pentacles
- swapped the order of the King and the Knight among the court cards, renaming them the Prince and the King, respectively
- changed the Page to become the Princess
- assigned each of the court cards to the letters of the Tetragrammaton, thus associating both the court cards and suits to the four classical elements, and
- associated each of the 36 cards ranked from 2 to 10, inclusive, with one of the 36 astrological decans.

The Hermetic Order never released its own tarot deck for public use, preferring instead for members to create their own copies of a deck designed by Mathers with art by his wife, Moina Mathers. (Note: No complete copies of this deck are known to exist, but copies of three trumps, one court card, and the entire set of minor arcana painted by Moina Mathers were preserved by the Whare Ra Temple of New Zealand, and a set of court cards believed to be those of W. W. Westcott were also preserved. Israel Regardie's later recreations of the deck were based on color photocopies of his personal deck for which the originals had been stolen.) However, many of these innovations would make their first public appearance in two influential tarot decks designed by members of the order: the Rider–Waite–Smith deck and the Thoth deck. In addition, occultist Israel Regardie involved himself in two separate recreations of the original Golden Dawn deck, the Golden Dawn Tarot of 1978 with art by Robert Wang, and the New Golden Dawn Ritual Tarot (Note: Rereleased as the Golden Dawn Magical Tarot in 2000 and 2010.) by Chic and Sandra Cicero, released, after Regardie's death, in 1991. The central document containing the Golden Dawn's Tarot interpretations, "Book T", was first published openly, if not under that title, by Aleister Crowley in his occult periodical The Equinox in 1912. The volume was later republished independently in 1967.

Golden Dawn correspondences of the Major Arcana
Tarot card	Hebrew letter	Element/planet/sign
0 The Fool	א Aleph	🜁 Air
I The Magician	ב Bet	☿ Mercury
II The High Priestess	ג Gimel	☾ Moon
III The Empress	ד Dalet	♀ Venus
IV The Emperor	ה He	♈︎ Aries
V The Hierophant	ו Vau	♉︎ Taurus
VI The Lovers	ז Zayin	♊︎ Gemini
VII The Chariot	ח Heth	♋︎ Cancer
VIII Strength	ט Teth	♌︎ Leo
IX The Hermit	י Yod	♍︎ Virgo
X Wheel of Fortune	כ Kaph	♃ Jupiter
XI Justice	ל Lamed	♎︎ Libra
XII The Hanged Man	מ Mem	🜄 Water
XIII Death	נ Nun	♏︎ Scorpio
XIV Temperance	ס Samekh	♐︎ Sagittarius
XV The Devil	ע Ayin	♑︎ Capricorn
XVI The Tower	פ Pe	♂ Mars
XVII The Star	צ Tsade	♒︎ Aquarius
XVIII The Moon	ק Qoph	♓︎ Pisces
XIX The Sun	ר Resh	☉ Sun
XX Judgement	ש Shin	🜂 Fire
XXI The World	ת Taw	♄ Saturn

=== Waite and Crowley ===
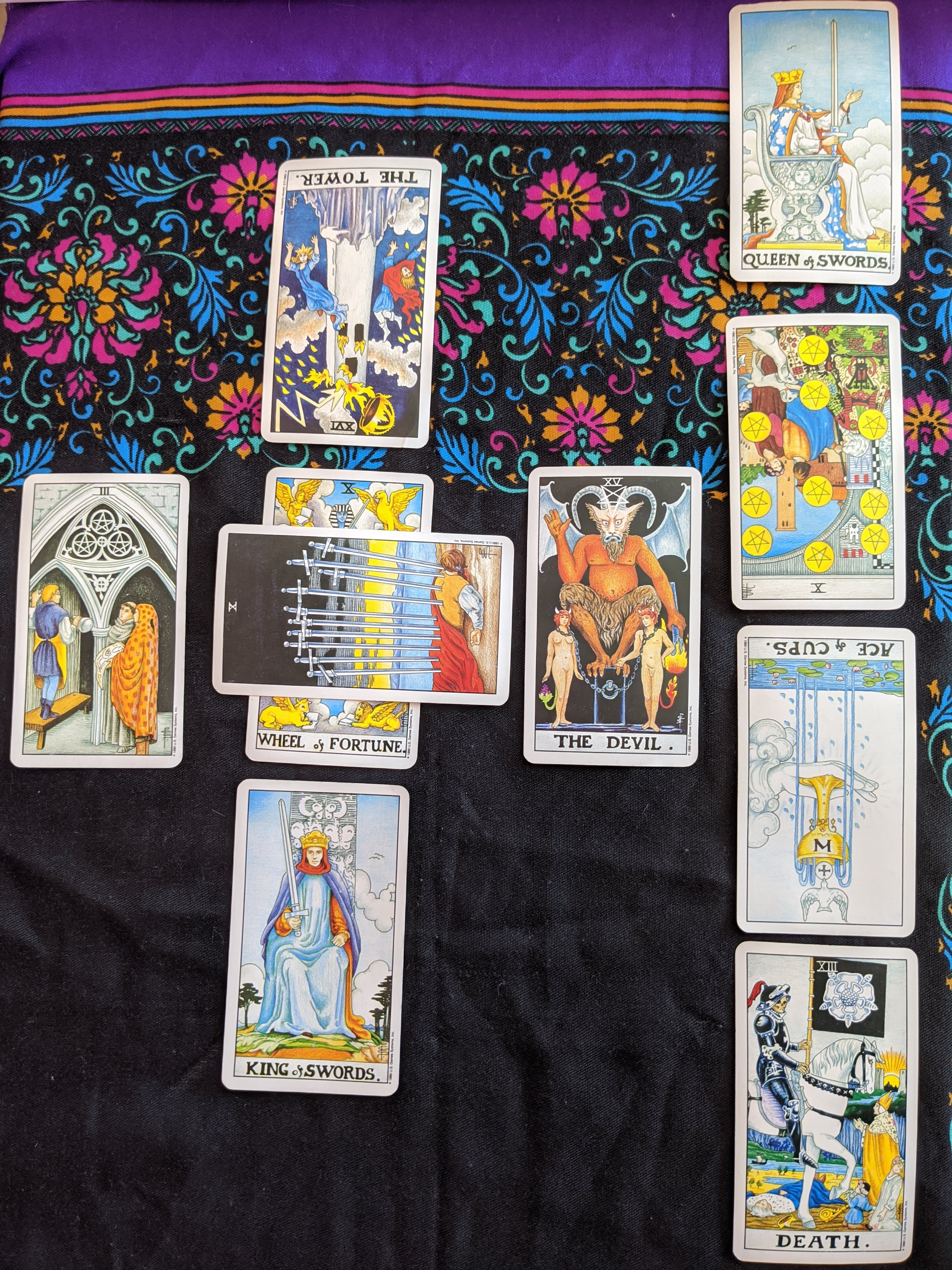
The Celtic Cross spread using the Universal Waite deck, a recolored variation of the original Rider–Waite deck

The Rider–Waite–Smith deck, (Note: Alternately named the Rider–Waite Tarot or Waite–Smith Tarot) released in 1909, was the first complete cartomantic tarot deck other than those derived from Etteilla's Egyptian tarot. (Oswald Wirth's 1889 deck had only depicted the major arcana.) The deck, designed by Arthur Edward Waite, was executed by Pamela Colman Smith, a fellow Golden Dawn member, and was the first tarot deck to feature complete scenes for each of the 36 suit cards between 2 and 10 since the Sola Busca tarot of the 15th century, with certain designs likely based in part on a number of photographs of them held by the British Museum. The deck followed the Golden Dawn in its choice of suit names and in swapping the order of the trumps of Justice and Strength, but essentially preserved the traditional designations of the court cards. The deck was followed by the release of The Key to the Tarot, also by Waite, in 1910. (Note: Re-released with black-and-white versions of Smith's artwork as The Pictorial Key to the Tarot, in 1911.)

The Thoth deck, first released as part of Aleister Crowley's The Book of Thoth in 1944, represent a somewhat different evolution of the original Golden Dawn designs. The deck, executed by Lady Frieda Harris as a series of paintings between 1938 and 1942, owes much to Crowley's development of Thelema in the years following the dissolution of the Hermetic Order. While the deck follows Golden Dawn teachings with respect to the zodiacal associations of the major arcana and the associations of the minor arcana with the various astrological decans, it also:

- reverted to the traditional Marseille numbering of Justice and Strength as arcana 8 and 11, respectively (though it retained the swapped associations with respect to the Hebrew alphabet)
- swapped the Hebrew alphabet associations of the fourth and seventeenth arcana (The Emperor and The Star, respectively), in accordance with Crowley's Liber Legis of 1913
- renamed several of the major arcana
- renamed the suits of Batons and Coins to Wands and Disks (the latter instead of the Golden Dawn's "Pentacles"), and
- adopted the Golden Dawn's court cards, except that the Knight was not renamed.

While Crowley managed to print a partial test run of the standalone deck using seven color plates included in The Book of Thoth, it was not until the 1960s, after Crowley and Harris's deaths, that the deck was first printed in its entirety.

=== Tarot divination in the United States ===
Two of the earliest publications on tarot in the English language were published in the United States, including a book by Madame Camille Le Normand entitled Fortune-Telling by Cards; or, Cartomancy Made Easy, published in 1872, and an anonymous American essay on the tarot published in The Platonist in 1885 entitled "The Taro". The latter essay is implied by Decker and Dummett to have been written by an individual with a connection to the occult order known as the Hermetic Brotherhood of Luxor. While it is not clear to what extent the Hermetic Brotherhood used tarot cards in its practices, it influenced later occult societies such as Elbert Benjamine's Church of Light, which had tarot practices (and an accompanying deck) of its own.

Adoption of the esoteric tarot practices of the Golden Dawn in the United States was driven in part by the American occultist Paul Foster Case, whose 1920 book An Introduction to the Study of the Tarot made use of the Rider–Waite–Smith deck and assorted esoteric associations first adopted by the Golden Dawn. By the 1930s, however, Case had formed his own occult order, the Builders of the Adytum, and began to promote the Revised New Art Tarot, (Note: Also known as the Knapp Tarot or Knapp-Hall Tarot) by Manly P. Hall with art by J. Augustus Knapp, as well as Case's own deck. Executed by Jessie Burns Parke, the artwork of Case's deck, the B.O.T.A. Tarot, generally resembles that of the Rider–Waite–Smith deck, but the deck also shows influences from Oswald Wirth and the original design of the Hermetic Order of the Golden Dawn tarot. Case promoted the deck in his 1947 book The Tarot: A Key to the Wisdom of the Ages, which also marked one of the first references to the work of Carl Jung by a tarotist.

Esoteric use of the Rider–Waite–Smith Tarot was also promoted in the works of Eden Gray, whose three books on the tarot made extensive use of the deck. Gray's books were adopted by members of the 1960s counter-culture as standard reference works on divinatory use of tarot cards, and her 1970 book A Complete Guide to the Tarot was the first work to use the metaphor of the "Fool's Journey" to explain the meanings of the major arcana.

=== Tarot divination since 1970 ===
The work of Eden Gray and others in the 1960s led to an explosion of popularity in tarot card reading beginning in 1969. Stuart R. Kaplan's U.S. Games Systems, which had been founded in 1968 to import copies of the Swiss 1JJ Tarot, was well positioned to take advantage of this explosion and reissued the then out-of-print Rider–Waite–Smith Tarot in 1970, which has not gone out of print since. Tarot card reading quickly became associated with New Age thought, signaled in part by the popularity of David Palladini's Rider–Waite–Smith-inspired Aquarian Tarot, first issued in 1968. Artists soon began to create their own interpretations of the tarot for artistic purposes rather than purely esoteric ones, such as the Mountain Dream Tarot of Bea Nettles, the first photographic tarot deck, released in 1975.

The 1980s and 1990s saw the rise of a new generation of tarotists, influenced by the writings of Eden Gray and the work of Carl Jung and Joseph Campbell on psychological archetypes. These tarotists sought to apply tarot card reading to personal introspection and growth, and included Mary K. Greer, the author of Tarot for Your Self: A Workbook for the Inward Journey (1984), and Rachel Pollack, the author of Seventy-Eight Degrees of Wisdom (1980/1983). Tarot cards also began to gain popularity as a divinatory tool in countries like Japan, where hundreds of new decks have been designed in recent years. The democratization of digital publishing in the 2000s and 2010s led to a new explosion of tarot decks as artists became increasingly able to self-publish their own.

== Use ==
Tarot is often used in conjunction with the study of the Hermetic Qabalah. In these decks all the cards are illustrated in accordance with Qabalistic principles, most being influenced by the Rider–Waite deck. Its images were drawn by artist Pamela Colman Smith, to the instructions of Christian mystic and occultist Arthur Edward Waite, and published in 1911.

A difference from Marseilles-style decks is that Waite and Smith use scenes with esoteric meanings on the suit cards. These esoteric, or divinatory meanings were derived in great part from the writings of the Hermetic Order of the Golden Dawn group, of which Waite had been a member. The meanings and many of the illustrations showed the influence of astrology as well as Qabalistic principles.

=== Trumps ===
The following is a comparison of the order and names of the Major Trumps up to and including the Rider–Waite–Smith and Crowley (Thoth) decks:

Tarot de Marseille	Court de Gébelin	Etteilla	Paul Christian	Oswald Wirth	Golden Dawn	Rider–Waite–Smith	Book of Thoth (Crowley)
I. The Juggler	I. The Thimblerig / Bateleur	15. Illness	I. The Magus	1. The Magician	I. The Magician	I. The Magician	I. The Magus
II. The Popess	II. The High Priestess	8. Female Questioner	II. The Gate of the Sanctuary	2. The Priestess	II. The High Priestess	II. The High Priestess	II. The Priestess
III. The Empress	III. The Queen	6. Night / Day	III. Isis–Urania	3. The Empress	III. The Empress	III. The Empress	III. The Empress
IV. The Emperor	IV. The King	7. Protection	IV. The Cubic Stone	4. The Emperor	IV. The Emperor	IV. The Emperor	IV. The Emperor
V. The Pope	V. The High Priest	13. Marriage / Union	V. The Master of the Mysteries	5. The Hierophant	V. The Hierophant	V. The Hierophant	V. The Hierophant
VI. The Lovers	VI. The Marriage	—	VI. The Two Roads	6. The Lover	VI. The Lovers	VI. The Lovers	VI. The Lovers
VII. The Chariot	VII. Osiris Triumphant	21. Dissension	VII. The Chariot of Osiris	7. The Chariot	VII. The Chariot	VII. The Chariot	VII. The Chariot
VIII. Justice	VIII. Justice	9. Justice / Jurist	VIII. Themis	8. Justice	XI. Justice	XI. Justice	VIII. Adjustment
IX. The Hermit	IX. The Sage	18. Traitor	IX. The Veiled Lamp	9. The Hermit	IX. The Hermit	IX. The Hermit	IX. The Hermit
X. The Wheel of Fortune	X. The Wheel of Fortune	20. Fortune / Increase	X. The Sphinx	10. The Wheel of Fortune	X. The Wheel of Fortune	X. Wheel of Fortune	X. Fortune
XI. Strength	XI. Strength	11. Strength / Sovereign	XI. The Tamed Lion	11. Strength	VIII. Strength	VIII. Strength	XI. Lust
XII. The Hanged Man	XII. Prudence	12. Prudence / The People	XII. The Sacrifice	12. The Hanged Man	XII. The Hanged Man	XII. The Hanged Man	XII. The Hanged Man
XIII. Death	XIII. Death	17. Mortality / Nothingness	XIII. The Skeleton Reaper	13. Death	XIII. Death	XIII. Death	XIII. Death
XIV. Temperance	XIV. Temperance	10. Temperance / Priest	XIV. The Two Urns	14. Temperance	XIV. Temperance	XIV. Temperance	XIV. Art
XV. The Devil	XV. Typhon	14. Great Force	XV. Typhon	15. The Devil	XV. The Devil	XV. The Devil	XV. The Devil
XVI. The Tower	XVI. Castle of Plutus	19. Misery / Prison	XVI. The Lightning-Struck Tower	16. The Tower	XVI. The Blasted Tower	XVI. The Tower	XVI. The Tower
XVII. The Star	XVII. The Dog Star	4. Desolation / Air	XVII. The Star of the Magi	17. The Star	XVII. The Star	XVII. The Star	XVII. The Star
XVIII. The Moon	XVIII. The Moon	3. Water / Comments	XVIII. The Twilight	18. The Moon	XVIII. The Moon	XVIII. The Moon	XVIII. The Moon
XIX. The Sun	XIX. The Sun	2. Enlightenment / Fire	XIX. The Blazing Light	19. The Sun	XIX. The Sun	XIX. The Sun	XIX. The Sun
XX. Judgement	XX. The Last Judgment	16. Judgment	XX. The Awakening of the Dead	20. Judgement	XX. Judgement	XX. Judgement	XX. The Aeon
XXI. The World	XXI. Time	5. Voyage / Earth	XXI. The Crown of the Magi	21. The World	XXI. The Universe	XXI. The World	XXI. The Universe
0. The Fool	0. The Fool	78 (or 0). Folly	0. The Crocodile	0. The Fool	0. The Fool	0. The Fool	0. The Fool

=== Personal use ===
Next to the usage of tarot cards to divine for others by professional cartomancers, tarot is also used widely as a device for seeking personal guidance and spiritual growth. Practitioners often believe tarot cards can help the individual explore one's spiritual path. A 2025 Pew Research Center survey found that 11% of U.S. adults consult tarot cards at least once a year, with most saying they do so primarily for fun rather than for guidance.

People who use the tarot for personal divination may seek insight on topics ranging widely from health or economic issues to what they believe would be best for them spiritually. Thus, the way practitioners use the cards in regard to such personal inquiries is subject to a variety of personal beliefs. For example, some tarot users may believe the cards themselves are magically providing answers, while others may believe a supernatural force or a mystical energy is guiding the cards into a layout.

Alternatively, some practitioners believe tarot cards may be utilized as a psychology tool based on their archetypal imagery, an idea often attributed to Carl Jung. Jung wrote, "It also seems as if the set of pictures in the Tarot cards were distantly descended from the archetypes of transformation, a view that has been confirmed for me in a very enlightening lecture by Professor Bernoulli." During a 1933 seminar on active imagination, Jung described the symbolism he saw in the imagery:

The original cards of the Tarot consist of the ordinary cards, the king, the queen, the knight, the ace, etc., only the figures are somewhat different, and besides, there are twenty-one [additional] cards upon which are symbols, or pictures of symbolical situations. For example, the symbol of the sun, or the symbol of the man hung up by the feet, or the tower struck by lightning, or the wheel of fortune, and so on. Those are sort of archetypal ideas, of a differentiated nature, which mingle with the ordinary constituents of the flow of the unconscious, and therefore it is applicable for an intuitive method that has the purpose of understanding the flow of life, possibly even predicting future events, at all events lending itself to the reading of the conditions of the present moment.

== Criticism ==
Skeptic James Randi once said that:

For use as a divinatory device, the tarot deck is dealt out in various patterns and interpreted by a gifted "reader." The fact that the deck is not dealt out into the same pattern fifteen minutes later is rationalized by the occultists by claiming that in that short span of time, a person's fortune can change, too. That would seem to call for rather frequent readings if the system is to be of any use whatsoever.

Tarot historian Michael Dummett similarly critiqued occultist uses throughout his various works, remarking that "the history of the esoteric use of Tarot cards is an oscillation between the two poles of vulgar fortune telling and high magic; though the fence between them may have collapsed in places, the story cannot be understood if we fail to discern the difference between the regions it demarcates." As a historian, Dummett held particular disdain for what he called "the most successful propaganda campaign ever launched", noting that "an entire false history, and false interpretation, of the Tarot pack was concocted by the occultists; and it is all but universally believed."

Today, Tarot card reading is commonly used as a spiritual and reflective tool rather than a form of fortune-telling. Many practitioners emphasize intuition, symbolism, and mindfulness.

Many Christian writers discourage divination, including tarot card reading, as deceptive and "spiritually dangerous", citing, for example, Leviticus 19:26 and Deuteronomy 18:9–12 as proof texts.

== See also ==
- Psychic reading
- Parrot astrology

== Bibliography ==
- Alexander, Skye and Mary Shannon (2019). The Only Tarot Book You'll Ever Need. Avon, MASS: Simon & Schuster.
- Berti, Giordano (2025), The History of Tarot. Truth and Legends behind the World's most Enigmatic Cards, Rinascimento Italian Style Art, Turin, ISBN 9798275213072
- Case, Paul Foster (August 2012) [first published 1920]. An Introduction to the Study of the Tarot. Ancient Wisdom Publications. ISBN 9781936690831.
- Case, Paul Foster (1947). The Tarot: A Key to the Wisdom of the Ages. New York: Macoy Publishing Company.
- Jasmine Jazz (2025-03-06). "The Cosmic River – Tarot Card Reading". The Cosmic River. The Cosmic River Global.
- Christian, Paul (1870). Histoire de la magie, du monde surnaturel et de la fatalité à travers les temps et les peuples. Paris: Furne, Jouvet et Cte.
- Court de Gébelin, Antoine (1781). Le monde primitif. Vol. VIII. Paris: Chez Court de Gébelin, Valleyre, & Sorin.
- Crowley, Aleister (1974) [first published 1944]. The Book of Thoth (Egyptian Tarot). New York: Samuel Weiser, Inc. ISBN 0877282684.
- Decker, Ronald; Depaulis, Thierry; Dummett, Michael (1996). A Wicked Pack of Cards: The Origins of the Occult Tarot. New York: St. Martin’s Press.
- Decker, Ronald; Dummett, Michael (2002). A History of the Occult Tarot: 1870–1970. London: Duckworth. ISBN 0715631225.
- Dummett, Michael (1980). The Game of Tarot. London: Duckworth. ISBN 0715631225.
- Frater S.M.R.D.; et al. (1967). The Secret Workings of the Golden Dawn: Book "T": The Tarot. Gloucester, England: Helios Book Service Ltd.
- Gray, Eden (1970). A Complete Guide to the Tarot. New York: Crown Publishers, Inc.
- Greer, Mary K. (September 2019) [first published 1984]. Tarot for Your Self: A Workbook for the Inward Journey (35th anniversary ed.). Newburyport, MA: Weiser Books. ISBN 9781578636792.
- Le Normand, Camille (1872). Fortune-Telling by Cards; or, Cartomancy Made Easy. New York: Robert M. De Witt.
- Lévi, Éliphas (1861). Dogme et rituel de la haute magie. Paris: Germer Baillière.
- Lévi, Éliphas (1861). La clef des grands mystères. Paris: Germer Baillière.
- Lévi, Éliphas (1886). The Mysteries of Magic.
- Lévi, Éliphas (1896). Transcendental Magic: Its Doctrine and Ritual. Translated by Waite, Arthur Edward. London: George Redway.
- Lévi, Éliphas (2002) [1959]. The Key of the Mysteries. Translated by Crowley, Aleister. Boston, MA: Red Wheel/Weiser. ISBN 0877280789.
- Mathers, S.L. MacGregor (1888). The Tarot: Its Occult Signification, Use in Fortune-Telling and Method of Play.
- Papus (1889). Le tarot des Bohémiens. Paris: Ernest Flammarion.
- Papus (2006) [first published 1909]. Le tarot divinatoire. Elibron Classics. ISBN 054378603X.
- Place, Robert (2005). The Tarot: History, Symbolism, and Divination. New York: Jeremy P. Tarcher/Penguin. ISBN 9781585423491.
- Pollack, Rachel (2019) [first published in two parts in 1980/1983]. Seventy-Eight Degrees of Wisdom: A Tarot Journey to Self-Awareness. Newburyport, MA: Weiser Books. ISBN 9781578636655.
- Star, Ély (1888). Les mystères de l'horoscope. Paris: E. Dentu.
- Waite, Arthur Edward (2005) [first published 1911]. The Pictorial Key to the Tarot. Mineola, NY: Dover Publications Inc. ISBN 9780486442556.
- Waite, Arthur Edward (1886). The Mysteries of Magic: A Digest of the Writings of Éliphas Lévi. London: George Redway.
- Westcott, W. Wynn (1887). Tabula Bembina, sive Mensa Isiaca: The Isiac Tablet of Cardinal Bembo: Its History and Occult Significance. Bath: Robt. H. Fryar.
- Wirth, Oswald (1966) [first published 1927]. Le tarot des imagiers du moyen âge. Claude Tchou.
