= Mathers table =

Display of the letters of the Hebrew alphabet

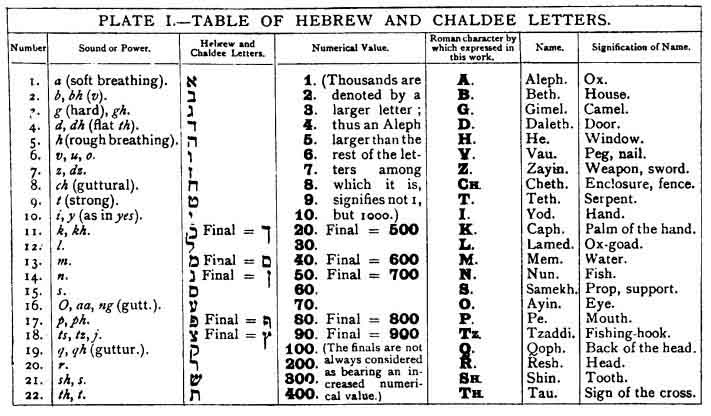
Mathers Table from the 1912 edition of The Kabbalah Unveiled.

The Mathers table of Hebrew and "Chaldee" (Aramaic) letters is a tabular display of the pronunciation, appearance, numerical values, transliteration, names, and symbolism of the twenty-two letters of the Hebrew alphabet appearing in The Kabbalah Unveiled, a late 19th century English translation of Kabbala Denudata by S.L. MacGregor Mathers, itself a Latin translation by Christian Knorr von Rosenroth of the Zohar, a primary Kabbalistic text.

== Overview ==
This table has been used as a primary reference for a basic understanding of the Hebrew alphabet as it applies to the Kabbalah, generally outside of traditional Jewish mysticism, by many modern Hermeticists and students of the occult, including members of the Hermetic Order of the Golden Dawn and other magical organizations deriving from it. It has been reproduced and adapted in many books published from the early 20th century to the present. (Note: A non-exhaustive list of books that reproduce the Mathers table either substantially or exactly: Bernstein, Henrietta (April 1984). Cabalah Primer: Introduction to the English/Hebrew Cabalah. Camarillo, CA: Devorss. ISBN 0-87516-526-5.; Bonner, John (March 2002). Qabalah: A Magical Primer. Boston: Red Wheel/Weiser. ISBN 1-57863-211-0.; Jones, Charles Stansfeld (Frater Achad) (April 2005). Q.B.L. or The Bride's Reception: Being A Qabalistic Treatise on the Nature and Use of the Tree of Life. York Beach, ME: Red Wheel/Weiser. ISBN 1-57863-331-1.; Mathers, S.L. MacGregor (2005). The Kabbalah: The Essential Texts From The Zohar. New York: Barnes & Noble Books. ISBN 0-7607-6977-X.; Regardie, Israel (1989). The Golden Dawn: A Complete Course in Practical Ceremonial Magic (Sixth ed.). St. Paul: Llewellyn Publications. ISBN 0-87542-663-8.; Zalewski, Pat (1993). The Kabbalah of the Golden Dawn (First ed.). St. Paul: Llewellyn Publications. ISBN 0-87542-873-8.)

== The Table ==
Table of Hebrew and Chaldee Letters
Number	Sound or Power	Hebrew and Chaldee Letter		Numerical Value		Roman Character Expressed	Name	Signification of Names
Number	Sound or Power	Non-final	Final	Non-final	Final	Roman Character Expressed	Name	Signification of Names
1.	a (soft breathing)	א		1 (Note: Thousands are denoted by a larger letter; thus an Aleph that is larger than the surrounding letters represents 1,000, not 1.)		A	Aleph	Ox
2.	b, bh (v)	ב		2		B	Beth	House
3.	g (hard), gh	ג		3		G	Gimel	Camel
4.	d, dh (flat th)	ד		4		D	Daleth	Door
5.	h (rough breathing)	ה		5		H	He	Window
6.	v, u, o	ו		6		V	Vau	Peg, nail
7.	z, dz	ז		7		Z	Zayin	Weapon, sword
8.	ch (guttural)	ח		8		Ch	Cheth	Enclosure, fence
9.	t (strong)	ט		9		T	Teth	Serpent
10.	i, y (as in yes)	י		10		I	Yod	Hand
11.	k, kh	כ	ך	20	500	K	Caph	Palm of the hand
12.	l	ל		30		L	Lamed	Ox-goad
13.	m	מ	ם	40	600	M	Mem	Water
14.	n	נ	ן	50	700	N	Nun	Fish
15.	s	ס		60		S	Samekh	Prop, support
16.	o, aa, ng (gutt.)	ע		70		O	Ayin	Eye
17.	p, ph	פ	ף	80	800	P	Pe	Mouth
18.	ts, tz, j	צ	ץ	90	900	Tz	Tzaddi	Fishing-hook
19.	q, qh (guttur.)	ק		100 (Note: The finals are not always considered as bearing an n-creased numerical value.)		Q	Qoph	Back of the head
20.	r	ר		200		R	Resh	Head
21.	sh, s	ש		300		Sh	Shin	Tooth
22.	th, t	ת		400		Th	Tau	Sign of the cross

== See also ==
- Gematria
- Kabbalah
- Mysticism
- Notaricon
