= Emily Katharine Bates =

English spiritualist and writer (1846–1922)

- Born: 1846; Dover, England
- Died: 13 February 1922 (aged 75); Bournemouth, England
- Occupations: Spiritualist; travel writer; novelist

Emily Katharine Bates (1846 – 13 February 1922) was an English spiritualist author, travel writer, and novelist.

== Biography ==
Emily Katharine Bates was born in 1846 in Dover, England, the youngest child of the Anglican Reverend John Ellison Bates and Ellen-Susan Carleton. She was orphaned at age nine. Her brother Charles Ellison Bates was injured in the Second Anglo-Afghan War in 1878 and she took charge of his care.

In 1885 and 1886, Bates travelled through the United States and Canada, resulting in the book A Year in the Great Republic (1887). In her book, she wrote about the difficulties of railroad and stagecoach travel: delays, poor food and lodging, train and stage accidents, labour conditions, and injuries and deaths of tourists.

In the United States, she attended her first séance. She grew more active in spiritualism and while she continued to write travel books, her writing increasingly focused on spiritualism. She joined the Hermetic Order of the Golden Dawn in 1891.

Bates died in Bournemouth, on 13 February 1922, aged 75.

== Bibliography ==
- Egyptian Bonds: A Novel. 2 vol. London: Bentley, 1879.
- A Year in the Great Republic. 1887.
- Kaleidoscope: Shifting Scenes from East to West. 1889.
- George Vyvian: A Novel. 2 vol. London: Hurst and Blackett, 1890.
- Seen and Unseen: Record of Physic Experiences. 1907.
- Do the Dead Depart? And Other Questions. 1908.
- Psychical Science and Christianity: A Problem of the Twentieth Century. 1909.
- The Coping Stone. 1912.
- Psychic Hints of a Former Life. 1912.
- The Boomerang: A Novel. 1914.
- Our Living Dead: Some Talks with Unknown Friends. 1917.
- Children of the Dawn. 1920.
