= Grimoire of Armadel =

17th century French Christian book

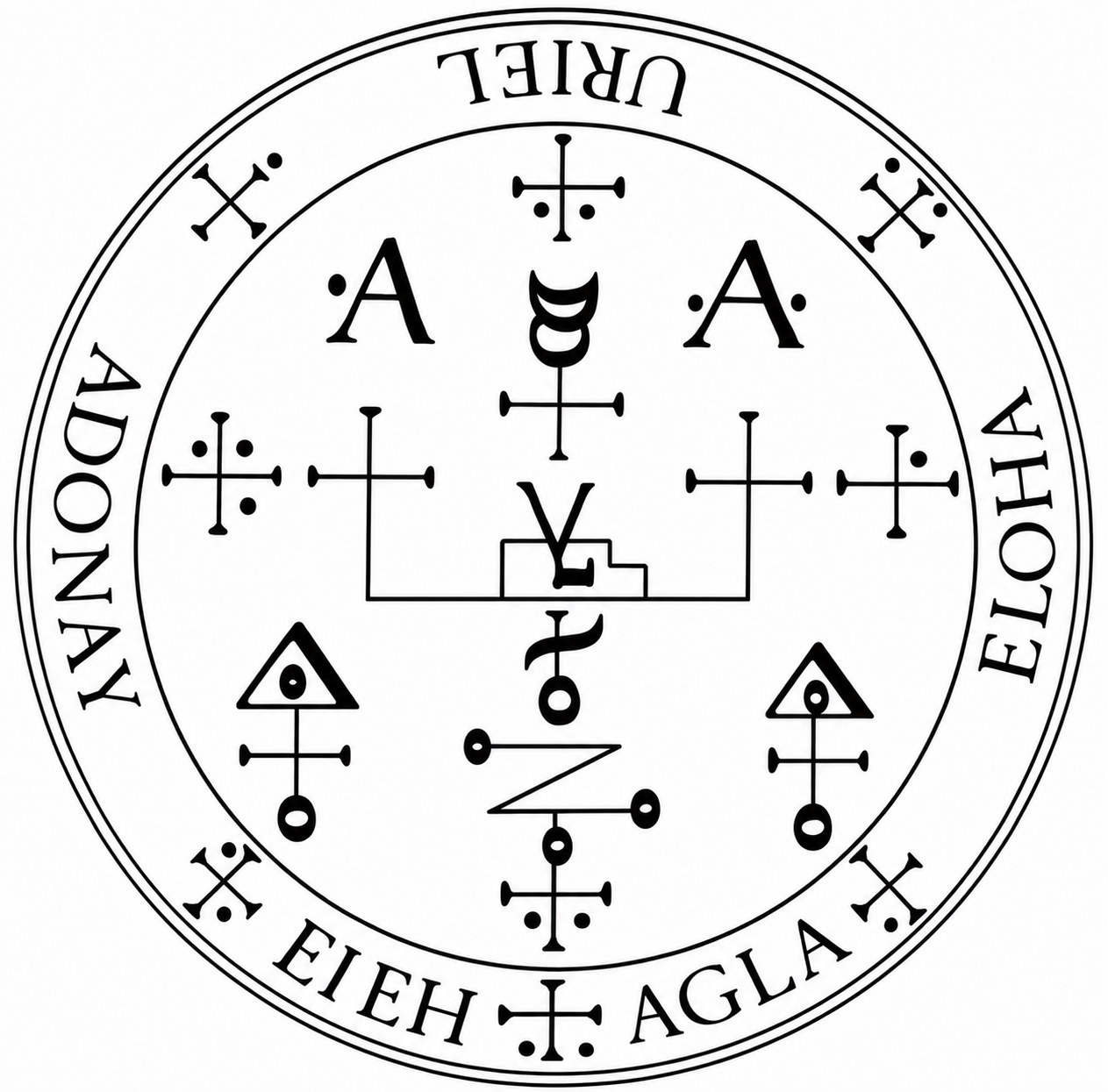
Sigil of Archangel Uriel (according to the Rabbinic tradition), one of multiple sigils of archangels presented in the grimoire

The Grimoire of Armadel (original title: Liber Armadel seu totius cabalae perfectissima brevissima et infallabilis scientia tam speculativa quam practiqua) is a minor 17th-century French Christian grimoire kept in the Bibliothèque de l'Arsenal in Paris. It was translated into English by S. L. MacGregor Mathers, and first published in 1980 after his death.

It should not be confused with British Library manuscript Lansdowne MS 1202, Les Vrais Clavicules du Roi Salomon, Par Armadel. Livre Quatrieme. Des Esprits qui gouvernent sous les Ordres du Souverain Createur (in English: The Key of King Solomon by Armadel. Book 4. The Spirits which govern under the Orders of the Sovereign Creator).
