= William Robert Woodman =

Co-founder of the Hermetic Order of the Golden Dawn

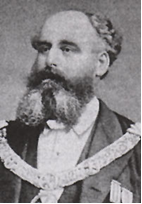
William Robert Woodman

William Robert Woodman (1828 – 20 December 1891) was an English medical doctor, horticultural expert and occultist who was Supreme Magus of the SRIA and one of three co-founders of the Hermetic Order of the Golden Dawn. He was also a member of several metaphysical orders in England.

== Early years ==
Woodman was born in England in 1828. He studied medicine and was licensed in 1851 and volunteered as a surgeon during Napoleon III's coup d'état.

== Career ==
Afterwards, he set up his own medical practice at Stoke Newington where he also served as police surgeon. He had a love for gardening and was a prominent horticulturalist and flower exhibitor. Inheritance left him with some property in Exeter. He retired there in 1871 to pursue his gardening aspirations, but moved back to London in 1887. The Royal Horticultural Society erected a memorial for his grave in Willesden.

== Esoteric orders ==
He was appointed Grand Sword Bearer of the United Grand Lodge of England, and he held high rank in many esoteric orders, including the Red Cross of Constantine.

=== The Societas Rosicruciana in Anglia ===
Woodman was admitted into the Societas Rosicruciana in Anglia on 31 October 1867 and appointed to the office of Secretary General in February 1868. He was co-editor for the society's journal, The Rosicrucian. In 1876, he was appointed Junior Substitute Magus, and in 1877 he was appointed Senior Substitute Magus. When Robert Little died in April 1878, Woodman became Supreme Magus. Under Woodman, the order expanded from London to the rest of England and was extending its influence to Australia and America.

=== Hermetic Order of the Golden Dawn ===
In 1887 he was given the honorary grade of Exempt Adept, of the Isis-Urania Temple of the Golden Dawn, founded in 1888, in which he held the office of Imperator. His mottos in the order were Magna est Veritas et Praelavebit (5=6, "Great is the Truth and it shall Prevail") and Vincit Omnia Veritas (7=4, "Truth Rules All").

Woodman is the least known among the three founders of the Golden Dawn because he died before the creation of the Golden Dawn's second order In the Golden Dawn, no one was appointed to take his place in the Triad of Chiefs: Westcott became Praemonstrator and Mathers, Imperator.

== Death ==
Woodman died suddenly on 20 December 1891 in London after a brief illness. He was 63. He left behind a letter naming William Wynn Westcott as his successor to the SRIA and donating a portion of his library to the society.

== See also ==
- Cipher Manuscripts
- Secret Chiefs
