= Adept =

One who has attained skill, knowledge or aptitude

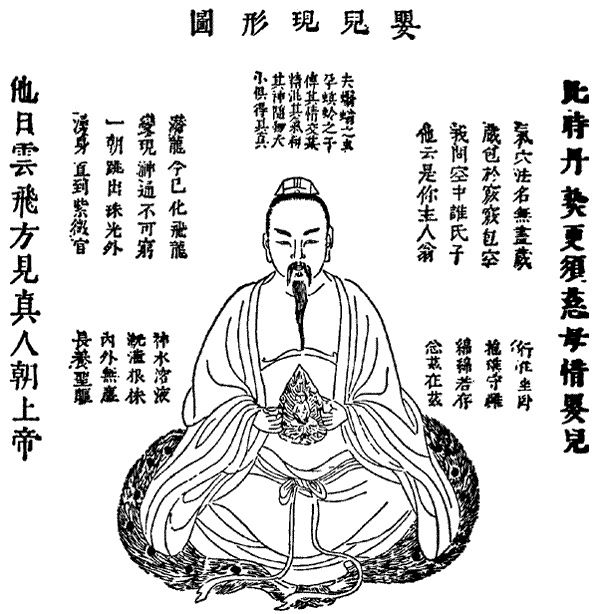
The Immortal Soul of the Taoist Adept

An adept is an individual identified as having attained a specific level of knowledge, skill, or aptitude in doctrines relevant to a particular occult discipline, such as alchemy or magic.

According to magical tradition, adepts stand out from others due to their enhanced abilities. All human qualities are developed in them, including intelligence and spirituality. According to Theosophist Charles Webster Leadbeater, anyone can become an adept through spiritual development and self-improvement, though others insist that initiation or esoteric transmission into a magical organization or tradition is a necessary preliminary.

== Etymology ==
The word "adept" is derived from Latin adeptus 'one who has attained' (the secret of transmuting metals). A. E. Waite recounts the use of the term in alchemy in his 1926 book, The Secret Tradition of Alchemy.

== Theosophy ==
=== H. P. Blavatsky ===
Madame Blavatsky makes liberal use of the term adept in her works to refer to their additional function as caretaker of ancient occult knowledge. She also mentions their great compassionate desire to help humanity and also documents other powers of the adept such as being able to take active control of elemental spirits as well as the physical and astral conditions of non-adepts.

=== Alice Bailey ===
In Alice Bailey's body of writing she outlines a hierarchy of spiritual evolution and an initiatory path along which an individual may choose to advance. In her works an Adept is defined as a being who has taken five of the seven initiations.

== Western esotericism ==
Those who practice esoteric arts such as theurgy and Kabbalah are familiar with the word 'adept.' In the traditions of esoteric Christianity and ceremonial magic, an adept is one who is skilled or profound, but not a master in these arts. Various magical organizations have steps in which an initiate may ascend in their own system. Some call these steps degrees or grades.

=== Hermetic Order of the Golden Dawn ===
In the initiatory system of the Hermetic Order of the Golden Dawn, an adept is one who has taken the oath of the 5–6 grade and has been granted the title Adeptus Minor (this grade system was taken from the Societas Rosicruciana in Anglia). Symbolically this degree represents a spiritual aspirant who, having mastered the union of the four elements under an upright and balanced spirit, is allowed passage from the Portal of the Vault of the Adepti into the tomb of Christian Rosenkreutz in the center of the Rosicrucian Mountain of Initiation, Abiegnus, at the center of the universe. The grade of Adeptus Minor and subsequent grades, Adeptus Major, and Adeptus Exemptus form the Second Order of the Golden Dawn, also called the Rosæ Rubeæ et Aureæ Crucis (The Ruby Rose and Golden Cross). These grades correspond to the kabbalistic sephirah of Tiphereth, Geburah, and Chesed respectively.

The oath of the Adeptus Minor includes a provision to "unite myself with my higher and Divine Genius", a process which is sometimes equated with "Knowledge and Conversation of the Holy Guardian Angel." To undertake this process the Adeptus Minor must reconfirm the work of earlier grades (Zelator through Philosophus) with their newfound knowledge before passing to the Adeptus Major degree, as a full-fledged adept.

=== A∴A∴ ===
Aleister Crowley, who formed the A∴A∴, restructured the Golden Dawn system. This system still holds to three forms of adept.

- Student
- The Order of the Golden Dawn
  - Probationer
  - Neophyte
  - Zelator
  - Practicus
  - Philosophus
- The Order of the R. C. (Rose Cross)
  - Dominus Liminis
  - Adeptus Minor
  - Adeptus Major
  - Adeptus Exemptus
- The Order of the S. S. (Silver Star)
  - Babe of the Abyss
  - Magister Templi
  - Magus
  - Ipsissimus

== See also ==
- Siddha
