= Secret Chiefs =

Beings in various occult movements

In various occultist movements, Secret Chiefs are said to be transcendent cosmic authorities, a spiritual hierarchy responsible for the operation and moral calibre of the cosmos, or for overseeing the operations of an esoteric organization that manifests outwardly in the form of a magical order or lodge system. Their names and descriptions have varied through time, differing among those who have claimed experience of contact with them. They are variously held to exist on higher planes of being or to be incarnate; if incarnate, they may be described as being gathered at some special location, such as Shambhala, or scattered through the world working anonymously.

== History ==
One early and influential source on these entities is Karl von Eckartshausen, whose The Cloud upon the Sanctuary, published in 1793, explained in some detail their character and motivations. Several 19th and 20th century occultists claimed to belong to or to have contacted these Secret Chiefs and made these communications known to others: Aleister Crowley (who used the term to refer to members of the upper three grades of his order, A∴A∴), Dion Fortune (who called them the "esoteric order"), and Max Heindel (who called them the "Elder Brothers").

=== Golden Dawn ===
The Hermetic Order of the Golden Dawn was founded by persons claiming to be in communication with the Secret Chiefs. One of these Secret Chiefs (or a person in contact with them) was supposedly the (probably fictional) Anna Sprengel, whose name and address were allegedly decoded from the Cipher Manuscripts by William Wynn Westcott.

In 1892, S. MacGregor Mathers (another founder) claimed that he had contacted these Secret Chiefs independently of Sprengel, and that this confirmed his position as head of the Golden Dawn. He declared this in a manifesto four years later saying that they were human and living on Earth, yet possessed terrible superhuman powers. He used this status to found the Second Order within the Golden Dawn, and to introduce the Adeptus Minor ritual.

=== Aleister Crowley ===
While in Algeria in 1909, Aleister Crowley, along with Victor Neuburg, recited numerous Enochian Calls or Aires. After the fifteenth Aire, he declared that he had attained the grade of Magister Templi (Master of the Temple), which meant that he was now on the level of these Secret Chiefs, although this declaration caused many occultists to stop taking him seriously if they had not done so already. He also described this attainment as a possible and in fact a necessary step for all who truly followed his path. (Note: Crowley (1935), in his One Star in Sight, says the order in question "is composed of those who have crossed the Abyss...the two crises — the Angel and the Abyss — are necessary features in every career.")

== See also ==
- Ascended master
- Church invisible
- Communion of the saints
- Great White Brotherhood
- Illuminati
- Twenty-Four Elders
- Tzadikim Nistarim ("36 righteous ones")
- Wali ("master", "authority", "custodian", or "protector")
