= Hermetic Order of the Golden Dawn =

British magical order (1887–1903)

- Rose Cross of the Golden Dawn
- Successor: Alpha et Omega; Stella Matutina; Isis-Urania Temple; Builders of the Adytum; A∴A∴
- Formation: 1887; 139 years ago
- Dissolved: 1903; 123 years ago
- Type: Magical organization
- Headquarters: London
- Location: United Kingdom
- Chiefs of the Second Order: William Wynn Westcott (1848–1925); Samuel Liddell MacGregor Mathers (1854–1918); William Robert Woodman (1828–1891)

The Hermetic Order of the Golden Dawn (Latin: Ordo Hermeticus Aurorae Aureae), more commonly the Golden Dawn (Aurora Aurea), was a secret society from the Western esoteric tradition that was heavily based on Rosicrucianism and inspired by Freemasonry, chiefly devoted to the study and practice of occult Hermeticism and metaphysics during the late 19th and early 20th centuries. Known as a magical order, the Hermetic Order of the Golden Dawn was active in Great Britain and focused its practices on theurgy and spiritual development. Many present-day concepts of ritual and magic that are at the centre of contemporary traditions, such as Wicca and Thelema, were inspired by the Golden Dawn, which became one of the largest single influences on 20th-century Western occultism. (Note: Jenkins 2000, p. 74: "Also in the 1880s, the tradition of ritual magic was revived in London by a group of Masonic adepts, who formed the Order of the Golden Dawn, which would prove an incalculable influence on the whole subsequent history of occultism.") (Note: Smoley 1999, pp. 102–103: "Founded in 1888, the Golden Dawn lasted a mere twelve years before it was shattered by personal conflicts. At its height, it probably had no more than a hundred members. Yet its influence on magic and esoteric thought in the English-speaking world would be hard to overestimate.")

The three founders, William Robert Woodman, William Wynn Westcott, and Samuel Liddell Mathers, were Freemasons and members of the Societas Rosicruciana in Anglia. Westcott appears to have been the initial driving force behind the establishment of the Golden Dawn. Hence the Golden Dawn system was based on hierarchy and initiation, similar to Masonic lodges. While the grade structure was based on the SRIA, women were admitted on an equal basis with men.

The "Golden Dawn" was the first of three Orders, although all three are often collectively referred to as the "Golden Dawn". The First Order taught esoteric philosophy based on the Hermetic Qabalah and personal development through study and awareness of the four classical elements, as well as the basics of astrology, tarot divination, and geomancy. The Second or Inner Order, the Rosae Rubeae et Aureae Crucis, taught magic, including scrying, astral travel, and alchemy. The Third Order was that of the Secret Chiefs, who were said to be highly skilled; they supposedly directed the activities of the lower two orders by spirit communication with the Chiefs of the Second Order.

== History ==
=== Cipher Manuscripts ===
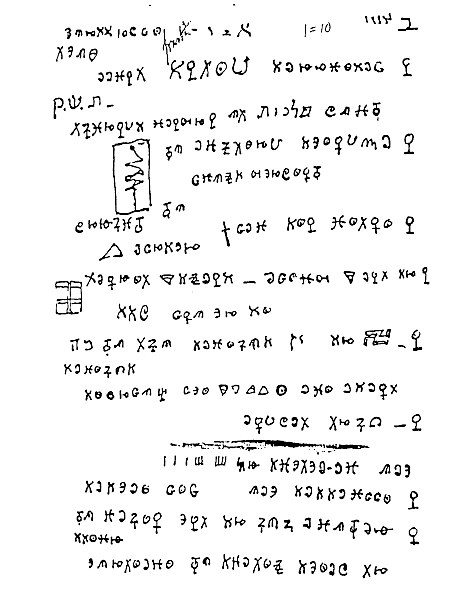
Folio 13 of the Cipher Manuscripts

The foundational documents of the original Order of the Golden Dawn, known as the Cipher Manuscripts, are written in English using the Trithemius cipher. The manuscripts give the specific outlines of the Grade Rituals of the Order and prescribe a curriculum of graduated teachings that encompass the Hermetic Qabalah, astrology, occult tarot, geomancy, and alchemy.

According to the records of the Order, the manuscripts passed from Kenneth R. H. Mackenzie, a Masonic scholar, to the Rev. A. F. A. Woodford, whom British occult writer Francis King describes as the fourth founder, although Woodford died shortly after the Order was founded. The documents did not excite Woodford, and in February 1886 he passed them on to Freemason William Wynn Westcott, who managed to decode them in 1887.

Westcott, pleased with his discovery, called on fellow Freemason Samuel Liddell MacGregor Mathers for a second opinion. Westcott asked for Mathers's help to turn the manuscripts into a coherent system for lodge work. Mathers asked fellow Freemason William Robert Woodman to assist the two, and he accepted.

Mathers and Westcott have been credited with developing the ritual outlines in the Cipher Manuscripts into a workable format. (Note: Golden Dawn researcher R. A. Gilbert has found evidence which suggests that Westcott was instrumental in developing the Order's rituals from the Cipher Manuscripts. See Gilbert's article, "From Cipher to Enigma: The Role of William Wynn Westcott in the Creation of the Hermetic Order of the Golden Dawn" in Runyon 1997.) Mathers is generally credited with the design of the curriculum and rituals of the Second Order, which he called the Rosae Rubae et Aureae Crucis ("Ruby Rose and Golden Cross" or the RR et AC).

=== Founding of the First Temple ===
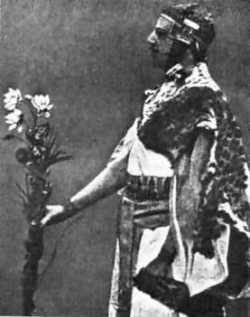
Samuel Liddell MacGregor Mathers in Egyptian costume performing a ritual in the Hermetic Order of the Golden Dawn

In October 1887, Westcott claimed to have written to a German countess and prominent Rosicrucian named Anna Sprengel, whose address was said to have been found in the decoded Cipher Manuscripts. According to Westcott, Sprengel claimed the ability to contact certain supernatural entities, known as the Secret Chiefs, that were considered the authorities over any magical order or esoteric organization. Westcott purportedly received a reply from Sprengel granting permission to establish a Golden Dawn temple and conferring honorary grades of Adeptus Exemptus on Westcott, Mathers, and Woodman. The temple was to consist of the five grades outlined in the manuscripts.

Kenneth Mackenzie claims to have been initiated as a Rosicrucian while living with Count Apponyi in Austria in his youth. He brought a legitimate Rosicrucian affiliation with him to England.

After his initiation, Mackenzie started a group called the Society of Eight, which was the first phase of the Golden Dawn.

The first temple, Temple Number 1, was the one founded by Mackenzie.

Temple Number 2 was founded by a man named F.G. Irwin in Bristol.

Anyone who has heard the story of the Hermetic Order of the Golden Dawn knows that Temple No. 3 of Isis-Urania was founded by Woodman, Wescott, and S.L. MacGregor Mathers, three high-degree Freemasons.

Why was this temple, which people consider the first of the Golden Dawn, actually Temple No. 3?

This is why the lineage of the Hermetic Order of the Golden Dawn is linked to Kenneth Mackenzie, who ruled Temple No. 1, and F.G. Irwin, who ruled Temple No. 2.

Woodman, Wescott, and Mathers were all high-degree Freemasons and members of a Rosicrucian Masonic society called SRIA, Societas Rosicruciana in Anglia.

There is a lot of misinformation these days, and one of them is that the Hermetic Order of the Golden Dawn originated from SRIA.

It turns out that the three founders of the Golden Dawn were also members of the SRIA.

And indeed, Kenneth Mackenzie was very skeptical of the SRIA members. He disliked Wescott and always kept him out of the Society of Eight.

This is the true story of the cipher manuscripts. There are many other fantastic stories, but what happened was that Mackenzie passed away.

And now that Mackenzie was out of the way, Wescott went to Mackenzie's widow to see if he could buy some documents from the Society of Eight.

And that's how Wescott got hold of the cipher manuscripts, which were the founding documents of the Hermetic Order of the Golden Dawn. This is how the Isis-Urania Temple was founded in London in 1888.

In contrast to the SRIA and Masonry, women were allowed and welcome to participate in the Order in "perfect equality" with men. The Order was more of a philosophical and metaphysical teaching order in its early years. Other than certain rituals and meditations found in the Cipher manuscripts and developed further, "magical practices" were generally not taught at the first temple.

For the first four years, the Golden Dawn was one cohesive group later known as the "First Order" or "Outer Order". A "Second Order" or "Inner Order" was established and became active in 1892. The Second Order consisted of members known as "adepts," who had completed the entire course of study for the First Order. The Second Order was formally established under the name Ordo Rosae Rubeae et Aureae Crucis. (the Order of the Red Rose and the Golden Cross)

Eventually, the Osiris temple in Weston-super-Mare, the Horus temple in Bradford (both in 1888), and the Amen-Ra temple in Edinburgh (1893) were founded. In 1893, Mathers founded the Ahathoor temple in Paris.

Golden Dawn Pentagram

=== The Secret Chiefs ===
In 1890, Westcott's alleged correspondence with Anna Sprengel suddenly ceased. He claimed to have received word from Germany that she was dead and that her companions did not approve of the founding of the Order, and no further contact was to be made. If the founders were to contact the Secret Chiefs, apparently, it had to be done on their own.

In 1892, Mathers professed that a link to the Secret Chiefs had been established. Subsequently, he supplied rituals for the Second Order. The rituals were based on the tradition of the tomb of Christian Rosenkreuz, and a Vault of Adepts became the controlling force behind the Outer Order. Later in 1916, Westcott claimed that Mathers also constructed these rituals from materials he received from Frater Lux ex Tenebris, a purported Continental Adept.

Some followers of the Golden Dawn tradition believe that the Secret Chiefs were not human or supernatural beings, but rather symbolic representations of actual or legendary sources of spiritual esotericism. The term came to stand for a great leader or teacher of a spiritual path or practice that found its way into the teachings of the Order.

=== Golden Age ===
By the mid-1890s, the Golden Dawn was well established in Great Britain, with over one hundred members from every class of Victorian society. Many celebrities belonged to the Golden Dawn, such as the actress Florence Farr, the Irish revolutionary Maud Gonne, the Irish poet William Butler Yeats, the Welsh author Arthur Machen, and the English authors Evelyn Underhill and Aleister Crowley.

In 1896 or 1897, Westcott broke all ties to the Golden Dawn, leaving Mathers in control. It has been speculated that his departure was due to his having lost a number of occult-related papers in a hansom cab. Apparently, when the papers were found, Westcott's connection to the Golden Dawn was discovered and brought to the attention of his employers. He may have been told to either resign from the Order or to give up his occupation as coroner. After Westcott's departure, Mathers appointed Florence Farr to be Chief Adept in Anglia. Dr. Henry B. Pullen Burry succeeded Westcott as Cancellarius—one of the three Chiefs of the Order.

Mathers was the only active founding member after Westcott's departure. Due to personality clashes with other members and frequent absences from the center of Lodge activity in Great Britain, however, challenges to Mathers's authority as leader developed among the members of the Second Order.

=== Revolt ===
Towards the end of 1899, the Adepts of the Isis-Urania and Amen-Ra temples had become dissatisfied with Mathers's leadership, as well as his growing friendship with Aleister Crowley. They had also become anxious to make contact with the Secret Chiefs themselves, instead of relying on Mathers as an intermediary. Within the Isis-Urania temple, disputes were arising between Farr's The Sphere, a secret society within the Isis-Urania, and the rest of the Adepti Minores.

Crowley was refused initiation into the Adeptus Minor grade by the London officials. Mathers overrode their decision and quickly initiated him at the Ahathoor temple in Paris on 16 January 1900. Upon his return to the London temple, Crowley requested from Miss Cracknell, the acting secretary, the papers acknowledging his grade, to which he was now entitled.

To the London Adepts, this was the final straw. Farr, already of the opinion that the London temple should be closed, wrote to Mathers expressing her wish to resign as his representative, although she was willing to carry on until a successor was found. Mathers believed Westcott was behind this turn of events, and replied on 16 February.

On 3 March a committee of seven Adepts was elected in London and requested a full investigation of the matter. Mathers sent an immediate reply, declining to provide proof, refusing to acknowledge the London temple, and dismissing Farr as his representative on 23 March. In response, a general meeting was called on 29 March in London to remove Mathers as chief and expel him from the Order.

==== Splinters ====
In 1901, W. B. Yeats privately published a pamphlet titled Is the Order of R. R. & A. C. to Remain a Magical Order? After the Isis-Urania temple claimed its independence, there were even more disputes, leading to Yeats resigning. A committee of three was to temporarily govern, which included P. W. Bullock, M. W. Blackden and J. W. Brodie-Innes. After a short time, Bullock resigned, and Dr. Robert Felkin took his place.

In 1903, A. E. Waite and Blackden joined forces to retain the name Isis-Urania, while Felkin and other London members formed the Stella Matutina. Yeats remained in the Stella Matutina until 1921, while Brodie-Innes continued his Amen-Ra membership in Edinburgh.

=== Reconstruction ===
Once Mathers realised that reconciliation was impossible, he made efforts to reestablish himself in London. The Bradford and Weston-super-Mare temples remained loyal to him, but their numbers were few. He then appointed Edward Berridge as his representative. According to Francis King, historical evidence shows that there were "twenty three members of a flourishing Second Order under Berridge-Mathers in 1913."

J.W. Brodie-Innes continued leading the Amen-Ra temple, deciding that the revolt was unjustified. By 1908, Mathers and Brodie-Innes were in complete accord. According to sources that differ regarding the actual date, sometime between 1901 and 1913 Mathers renamed the branch of the Golden Dawn remaining loyal to his leadership, to Alpha et Omega. (Note: Anon 2001: "The Golden Dawn ceased to exist by that name after October 1901, replaced by Mathers's Alpha et Omega and the London group’s Order of the Morgan Rothe. No longer associated with the SRIA after 1902, Mathers continued to oversee a few temples until his death, when his wife, Moina, assumed supervision.")

Brodie-Innes assumed command of the English and Scottish temples, while Mathers concentrated on building up his Ahathoor temple and extending his American connections. According to occultist Israel Regardie, the Golden Dawn had spread to the United States of America before 1900 and a Thoth-Hermes temple had been founded in Chicago. By the beginning of the First World War in 1914, Mathers had established two to three American temples.

Most temples of the Alpha et Omega and Stella Matutina closed or went into abeyance by the end of the 1930s, with the exceptions of two Stella Matutina temples: Hermes Temple in Bristol, which operated sporadically until 1970, and the Smaragdum Thallasses Temple, commonly referred to as Whare Ra, in Havelock North, New Zealand, which operated regularly until its closure in 1978.

== Structure and grades ==
Much of the hierarchical structure for the Golden Dawn came from the Societas Rosicruciana in Anglia, which was itself derived from the Order of the Golden and Rosy Cross.

First Order

- Neophyte 0=0
- Zelator 1=10
- Theoricus 2=9
- Practicus 3=8
- Philosophus 4=7

Second Order

- Adeptus Minor 5=6
- Adeptus Major 6=5
- Adeptus Exemptus 7=4

Third Order

- Magister Templi 8=3
- Magus 9=2
- Ipsissimus 10=1

The paired numbers attached to the Grades relate to positions on the Tree of Life. The Neophyte Grade of "0=0" indicates no position on the Tree. In the other pairs, the first numeral is the number of steps up from the bottom (Malkuth), and the second numeral is the number of steps down from the top (Kether).

The First Order Grades were related to the four elements of Earth, Air, Water, and Fire, respectively. The Aspirant to a Grade received instruction on the metaphysical meaning of each of these Elements and had to pass a written examination and demonstrate certain skills to receive admission to that Grade.

== Membership ==
=== Selected known members ===
- Pamela Colman Smith (1878-1951), British artist, illustrator, publisher, and writer
- Emily Katharine Bates (1846–1922), British spiritualist author, travel writer, and novelist
- Charles Henry Allan Bennett (1872–1923), best known for introducing Buddhism to the West
- Arnold Bennett (1867–1931), British novelist
- Edward W. Berridge (ca. 1843–1923), British homeopathic physician
- Algernon Blackwood (1869–1951), British writer and radio broadcaster of supernatural stories
- Gabrielle Borthwick (1866–1952), British pioneering motorist, mechanic, garage owner, and driving teacher
- Anna de Brémont (1849–1922), American singer and writer
- Aleister Crowley (1875–1947), occultist, writer and mountaineer, founder of his own magical society
- Florence Farr (1860–1917), London stage actress and musician
- Robert Felkin (1853–1926), medical missionary, explorer and anthropologist in Central Africa, author, founder of the New Zealand branch of the Golden Dawn and the Smaragdum Thalasses / Whare Ra temple
- Frederick Leigh Gardner (1857–1930), British stockbroker and occultist; published three-volume bibliography Catalogue Raisonné of Works on the Occult Sciences (1912)
- Annie Horniman (1860–1937), British repertory theatre producer and pioneer; member of the wealthy Horniman family of tea-traders
- Arthur Machen (1863–1947), leading London writer of the 1890s, author of acclaimed works of imaginative and occult fiction, such as "The Great God Pan", "The White People" and "The Hill of Dreams". Welsh by birth and upbringing
- Moina Mathers (1865–1928), London trained artist, wife of S. L. MacGregor-Mathers and sister of philosopher Henri Bergson
- Samuel Liddell MacGregor-Mathers (1854–1918), British Freemason, one of the three founders of the Golden Dawn, prolific writer, occultist, and researcher
- Alfred John Pearce (1840–1923), medic, writer, pioneering weather forecaster and celebrated astrologer known as "Zadkiel"
- Sax Rohmer (1883–1959), novelist, creator of the Fu Manchu character
- William Sharp (1855–1905), poet and author; alias Fiona MacLeod
- Violet Tweedale (1862–1936), Scottish writer and spiritualist
- Arthur Edward Waite (1857–1942), British writer, Freemason and co-creator of the Rider–Waite tarot deck
- William Wynn Westcott (1848–1925), founder of the Golden Dawn, doctor, London coroner, prolific writer, British Freemason, former Supreme Magus of the Societas Rosicruciana in Anglia (SRIA)
- Constance Wilde (1858-1898), writer and wife of Oscar Wilde. (http://www.wrightanddavis.co.uk/GD/WILDE.htm)
- William Robert Woodman (1828–1891), doctor, British Freemason, former Supreme Magus of the Societas Rosicruciana in Anglia, one of the three founders of the Golden Dawn
- W. B. Yeats (1865–1939), Irish poet, dramatist and writer.

=== Alleged members ===
- E. Nesbit (1858–1924), English author and political activist. According to biographer Eleanor Fitzsimons: "Edith's reputed membership in the Hermetic Order of the Golden Dawn, the foremost occult organization of the day, is intriguing. … Most biographical accounts suggest that Edith was a member of the Golden Dawn, but evidence to support this is rarely cited. The organization was of course secretive by nature, but eyewitness accounts never mentioned her as they did others, and her name does not appear on the rolls."

== Other Golden Dawn orders ==
While no temples in the original chartered lineage of the Golden Dawn survived past the 1970s, several organizations have since carried on, revived or expanded upon the Order's teachings and rituals, including:

- The Hermetic Order of the Golden Dawn, Inc. (founded 1977)
- Thelemic Order of the Golden Dawn (founded 1990)
- Open Source Order of the Golden Dawn (2002–2019)

== Israel Regardie's Publication of the Teachings ==
The Golden Dawn: The Original Account of the Teachings, Rites and Ceremonies of the Hermetic Order, by Israel Regardie, was published in four volumes between 1937 and 1940. It was divided into several sections by topic. First are the knowledge lectures, which describe the basic teaching of the Qabalah, symbolism, meditation, geomancy, etc. This is followed by the rituals of the Outer Order, consisting of five initiation rituals into the degrees of the Golden Dawn. The next section covers the rituals of the Inner Order including two initiation rituals and equinox ceremonies.

Regardie's work, later collected into a single volume, has gone through hardback and paperback editions and remains in print as of 2026.

== See also ==
- A∴A∴ § The Order of the G∴D∴ (Golden Dawn)
- Magical organization – Organization for the practice of occult magic
- Tattva vision – Subject related to ESP
