= Robert Wentworth Little =

British freemason leader (1840–1878)

Robert Wentworth Little (1840 – April 11, 1878) was a clerk and cashier of the secretary's office at the United Grand Lodge of England and later secretary of the Royal Institution for Girls. He was a well-known founder of Masonic orders in the 1860s and 70s, being responsible for four: the Societas Rosicruciana in Anglia (1867), the Red Cross of Constantine (1862), the Ancient Archeological Order of Druids (1874) and the Rite of Memphis-Misraim (1870). He is credited with the structural design of the S.R.I.A. with the rituals acquired from the store room of Freemasons Hall. He was also a founder of the Ancient and Primitive Rite of Misraim in England.

Various controversy around the origins of the S.R.I.A. seem to be resolved in a paper given at the General Assembly of the S.R.I.A. at Perth, 3 May 1947 and thereafter at the Metropolitan Study Group, S.R.I.A. on May 10, 1947 by the author, R.W. Frater H.C. Bruce Wilson, VIII°, 9°, and printed in Proceedings of General Assembly held at Perth, 3 and 4 May 1947. It was printed for Private Circulation by the S.R.I.S. at Edinburgh, 1947 on pages 10–24.

The paper concludes that especially the opening and closing S.R.I.A. (founded 1867) rituals were adopted from a body of the S.R.I.S. (Societas Rosicruciana in Scotia), which was in operation in 1830. The other parts of the ritual were adopted with changes, for instance to the number of Ancients. It also concludes that the lineage of the S.R.I.A. is derived from the German Golden Rosy Cross of 1776.

Robert Wentworth Little's grave was rediscovered at the Camberwell Old Cemetery on common ground and restored.

== See also ==
- John Fletcher Little

== Sources ==
- Complete History of the Rosicrucian Order by H. Spencer Lewis
- The Origin of the Rosicrucian Society
