= Samuel Liddell MacGregor Mathers =

British occultist (1854–1918)

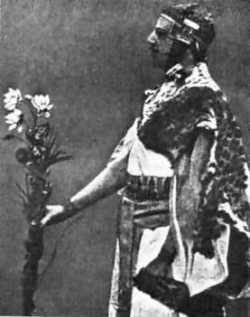
- Mathers, in Egyptian costume, performs a ritual of Isis in the rites of the Golden Dawn
- Born: 8 January 1854; Hackney, London, England
- Died: 5 or 20 November 1918 (aged 64); Paris, France
- Education: Bedford School
- Occupation: Occultist
- Known for: Hermetic Order of the Golden Dawn
- Spouse: Moina Mathers
- Parent: William M. Mathers

Samuel Liddell (or Liddel) MacGregor Mathers (8 January 1854 – 5 or 20 November 1918), born Samuel Liddell Mathers, was a British occultist and member of the S.R.I.A. He is primarily known as one of the three founders of the Hermetic Order of the Golden Dawn, a ceremonial magic order of which offshoots still exist. He became so synonymous with the order that Golden Dawn scholar Israel Regardie observed in retrospect that "the Golden Dawn was MacGregor Mathers."

== Early life ==
Mathers was born on 8 January 1854 in Hackney, London, England. His father, William M. Mathers, a commercial clerk, died while he was still a boy. He lived with his widowed mother (whose maiden name was Collins) in Bournemouth, until her death in 1885. Mathers attended Bedford Grammar School and subsequently worked as a clerk, before moving to King's Cross in London, following the death of his mother.

Mathers met Mina Bergson, sister of philosopher Henri Bergson, in the British Museum Reading Room where he spent much of his time. The two had an immediate rapport and were married on 16 June 1890, despite the opposition of Mina's family. The couple lived in Forest Hill until they had to move to central London due to poverty. There, they were financially supported by Annie Horniman, a wealthy tea heiress who helped Mathers get a job at her family museum and eventually joined the Order of the Golden Dawn. Horniman continued supporting the couple until 1896.

Mathers was fascinated by Celtic Symbology and his purported Highland Scottish ancestry from an early age. According to his wife, he was related to Ian MacGregor of Glenstrae, an ardent Jacobite who went to France after the 1745 uprising and fought at the Battle of Pondicherry, under Thomas Arthur, comte de Lally. Louis XV made him Comte de Glenstrae for his services. Mathers adopted the "MacGregor" prefix to honour his ancestor.

As a young man, Mathers became acquainted with Kenneth R. H. Mackenzie, a noted Freemason and occultist, who was friends with Edward Bulwer-Lytton. It was through Bulwer-Lytton and Anna Kingsford that Mathers got introduced to Helena P. Blavatsky in 1887. Blavatsky invited Mathers to collaborate with her in the formation of what later became known as the Theosophical Society, but, notwithstanding his admiration for Blavatsky, Mathers declined her invitation as there were some important differences between her philosophy and his.

According to the records of the Hermetic Order of the Golden Dawn, the organization's foundational documents, called the Cipher Manuscripts, were passed from Mackenzie to the Rev. A. F. A. Woodford. In turn, Woodford passed them on to Freemason William Wynn Westcott in 1886, who managed to decode them a year later, and upon doing so, called on Mathers for a second opinion. Mathers is credited with the design of the curriculum and rituals of the Order, and together with Woodford and Westcott, he is considered as one of the three founders.

== Lifestyle ==
Mathers was a practicing vegetarian, or (according to some accounts) vegan, an outspoken anti-vivisectionist, and a non-smoker. He was also a supporter of women's rights and he had little interest in money. It is known that his main interests were magic, military tactics and warfare, his first book being a translation of a French military manual, Practical Instruction in Infantry Campaigning Exercise (1884). He was also a keen student of boxing and fencing.

Mathers became increasingly eccentric in his later years as was noted by W. B. Yeats.

=== Freemasonry ===
Mathers was introduced to Freemasonry by a neighbour, alchemist Frederick Holland, and was initiated into Hengist Lodge No.195 on 4 October 1877. He was raised as a Master Mason on 30 January 1878. In 1882 he was admitted to the Metropolitan College of the Societas Rosicruciana in Anglia as well as a number of fringe Masonic degrees. Working hard both for and in the SRIA he was awarded an honorary 8th Degree in 1886, and in the same year he lectured on the Kabbalah to the Theosophical Society. He became Celebrant of Metropolitan College in 1891 and was appointed as Junior Substitute Magus of the SRIA in 1892, in which capacity he served until 1900. He left the order in 1903, having failed to repay money which he had borrowed.

In 1891, Mathers assumed leadership of the Hermetic Order of the Golden Dawn upon the death of William Robert Woodman. He moved with his wife to Paris on 21 May 1892. After his expulsion from the Golden Dawn in April 1900, Mathers formed a group in Paris in 1903 called Alpha et Omega (its headquarters, the Ahathoor Temple). Mathers chose the title "Archon Basileus".

=== Translations ===
Mathers was a polyglot; among the languages he had studied were English, French, Latin, Greek, Hebrew, Gaelic and Coptic, though he had a greater command of some languages than of others. His translations of such books as The Book of Abramelin (14th century), Christian Knorr von Rosenroth's The Kabbalah Unveiled (1684), Key of Solomon (anonymous, 14th century), The Lesser Key of Solomon (anonymous, 17th century), and the Grimoire of Armadel (17th century), while probably justly criticised with respect to quality, were responsible for making what had been obscure and inaccessible material widely available to the non-academic English-speaking world. They have had considerable influence on the development of occult and esoteric thought since their publication, as have his consolidation of the Enochian magical system of John Dee and Edward Kelley, and his studies in Egyptology.

== Criticism ==
In addition to many supporters, he had many enemies and critics. One of his most notable enemies was one-time friend and pupil Aleister Crowley, who portrayed Mathers as a villain named SRMD in his 1917 novel Moonchild.

Earlier, Crowley wrote in his Confessions that: "As far as I was concerned, Mathers was my only link with the Secret Chiefs to whom I was pledged. I wrote to him offering to place myself and my fortune unreservedly at his disposal; if that meant giving up the Abra-Melin Operation for the present, all right."

In The Doctrine and Literature of the Kabalah (1902), A. E. Waite criticises Mathers' previously published work on the subject, in the following terms: "the Kabbalah Unveiled [1887] of Mr. S. L. MacGregor Mathers, which is largely translation and commentary, and, in addition to other limitations, embraces therefore only a small portion of an extensive literature."

== Decline and death ==
Mathers died on 5 or 20 November 1918 in Paris, during the Spanish influenza pandemic. His death certificate (now lost) listed no cause of death and for many years his burial site remained unknown, leading some to claim he did not die and had achieved immortality. The grave has since been found in Paris. Aleister Crowley, in his Confessions, wrote of the decline of the Hermetic Order of the Golden Dawn, as well as that of MacGregor Mathers. He lamented what he saw as the irredeemable changes by Waite in his order and MacGregor Mathers's legacy of well-meaning but low-quality leadership in his last years. (Note: Crowley (1979), p. 196: "They [the remaining members of the Golden Dawn] went on squabbling amongst themselves for a few months and then had the sense to give up playing at Magick. Their only survivor is Arthur Edward Waite, who still pretends to carry on the business, though he has substituted a pompous, turgid rigmarole of bombastic platitudes for the neophyte ritual, so that the last spark of interest is extinct for ever. Mathers, of course, carried on; but he had fallen. The Secret Chiefs cast him off; he fell into deplorable abjection; even his scholarship deserted him. He published nothing new and lived in sodden intoxication till death put an end to his long misery.")

== Published works ==
- Mathers, S. L. MacGregor (1887). The Kabbalah Unveiled. London: Kegan Paul, Trench, Trubner & Co.
- Mathers, S. L. MacGregor (1888). The Tarot (pamphlet).
- Mathers, S. L. MacGregor (1889). The Key of Solomon The King. London: George Redway.
- von Worms, Abraham (1900). The Book of the Sacred Magic of Abramelin the Mage. Translated by S. L. MacGregor Mathers. London: John M. Watkins.
- Mathers, S. L. MacGregor (1904). Crowley, Aleister (ed.). The Lesser Key of Solomon: Goetia. Foyers, Inverness: Society for the Propagation of Religious Truth.

== See also ==
- List of occultists
- List of unsolved deaths
- Mathers table
