= Societas Rosicruciana in Anglia =

Rosicrucian esoteric Christian order

- The jewel of the Societas Rosicruciana In Anglia features a red cross containing a pentagram at its centre.
- Formation: 1865
- Type: Freemasonry; Rosicrucianism
- Headquarters: Yorkshire, England
- Location(s): England Wales The Netherlands France Germany Hungary Australia New Zealand Canada Slovenia (Georgia (country)) Georgia
- Supreme Magus: First: Robert Wentworth Little (1869–1878); Current: Anthony W. Llewellyn (2019–present)
- Website: sria.uk.com

Societas Rosicruciana in Anglia (Rosicrucian Society of England) or SRIA is a Rosicrucian esoteric Christian order formed by Robert Wentworth Little between 1865 and 1867. While the SRIA is not a Masonic order (unattached to any Grand Lodge structure or Masonic Rite), aspirants (people seeking membership) are strictly confirmed from the ranks of subscribing Master Masons of a Grand Lodge in amity with United Grand Lodge of England.

The structure and grade of this order, as A. E. Waite suggests, were derived from the 18th-century German Order of the Golden and Rosy Cross. It later became the same grade system used for the Hermetic Order of the Golden Dawn.

The Fratres (singular. Frater) of the Society meet in Colleges, which are presided over by an annually elected Celebrant who also oversees all First Order ceremonial. Chief Adepts are responsible for all Colleges within their Province, they personally oversee all Second Order ceremonial activities and are appointed by The Supreme Magus who governs the Society worldwide via his High Council and oversees Third Order ceremonial.

SRIA Colleges can be found in England, Australia, New Zealand, Canada, Wales, France, Germany, The Netherlands, Hungary, Georgia, and Slovenia.

In addition to the ceremonial work within colleges, each Frater is encouraged to research, present, and discuss, papers covering a range of topics, including but not limited to symbolism, alchemy, artificial intelligence, philosophy, esotericism, spirituality, and mysticism.

The society has a rare collection of 400 year old Rosicrucian books, letters and manuscripts, which are on loan to the Library and Museum of Freemasonry in Freemasons Hall, home of the United Grand Lodge of England.

== History ==
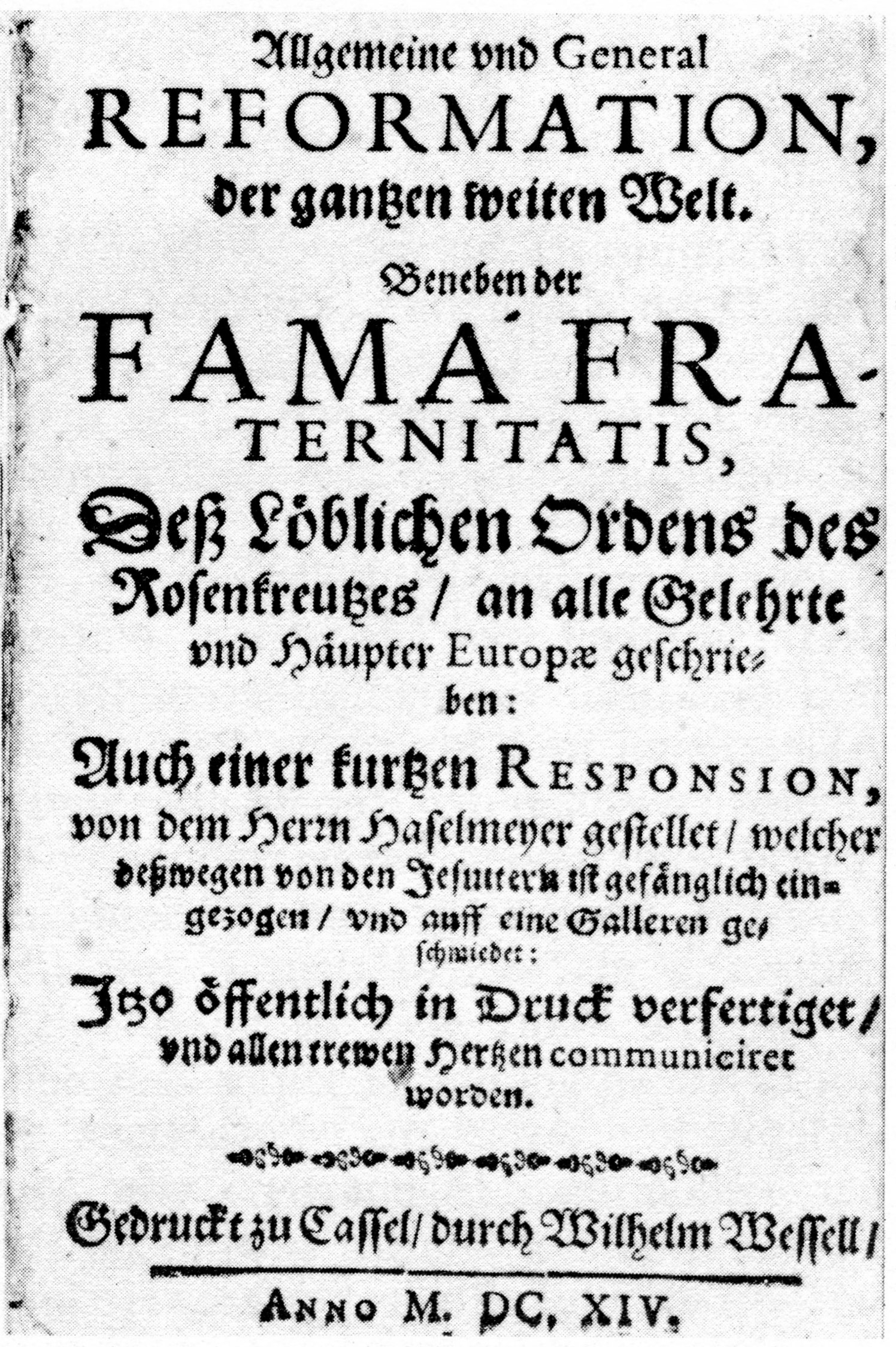
First page of the Fama Fraternitatis Rosae Crucis (1614)

The society is inspired by the original Rosicrucian Brotherhood but does not openly claim a provable link thereto. It bases its teachings on those found in the Fama and Confessio Fraternitatis published in the early 17th century in Germany, along with other similar publications from the same time such as the Chymical Wedding of Christian Rosenkreutz.

The society was founded in 1867, derived from a pre-existing Rosicrucian 'non-Masonic' order in Scotland (which bore no relation to the similarly named Societas Rosicruciana in Scotia, which was a later creation), following the admission of William James Hughan and Robert Wentworth Little. Little was a clerk and cashier of the General Secretary of the United Grand Lodge of England, William Henry White. These Fratres were advanced quickly in Scotland and granted a warrant to form a Society in England. The formation meeting took place on 1 June 1867 in Aldermanbury, London with Frater Little elected Master Magus, the title of "Supreme Magus" not being invented until some years later.

The Rosy Cross

The organisation was initially named the Rosicrucian Society of England or the Brethren of the Rosy Cross, these names are still used interchangeably to this day. However, the former name was Latinised to Societas Rosicruciana in Anglia (or SRIA), and has been commonly used throughout the society since 1889.

They produced a journal, called The Rosicrucian, which was co-edited by William Robert Woodman.

The national headquarters of the Society was Stanfield Hall in Hampstead, London, until 2022 when the society relocated its Library to the Museum of Freemasonry, and its Headquarters to Harlthorpe Hall in Yorkshire.

== Membership requirements ==
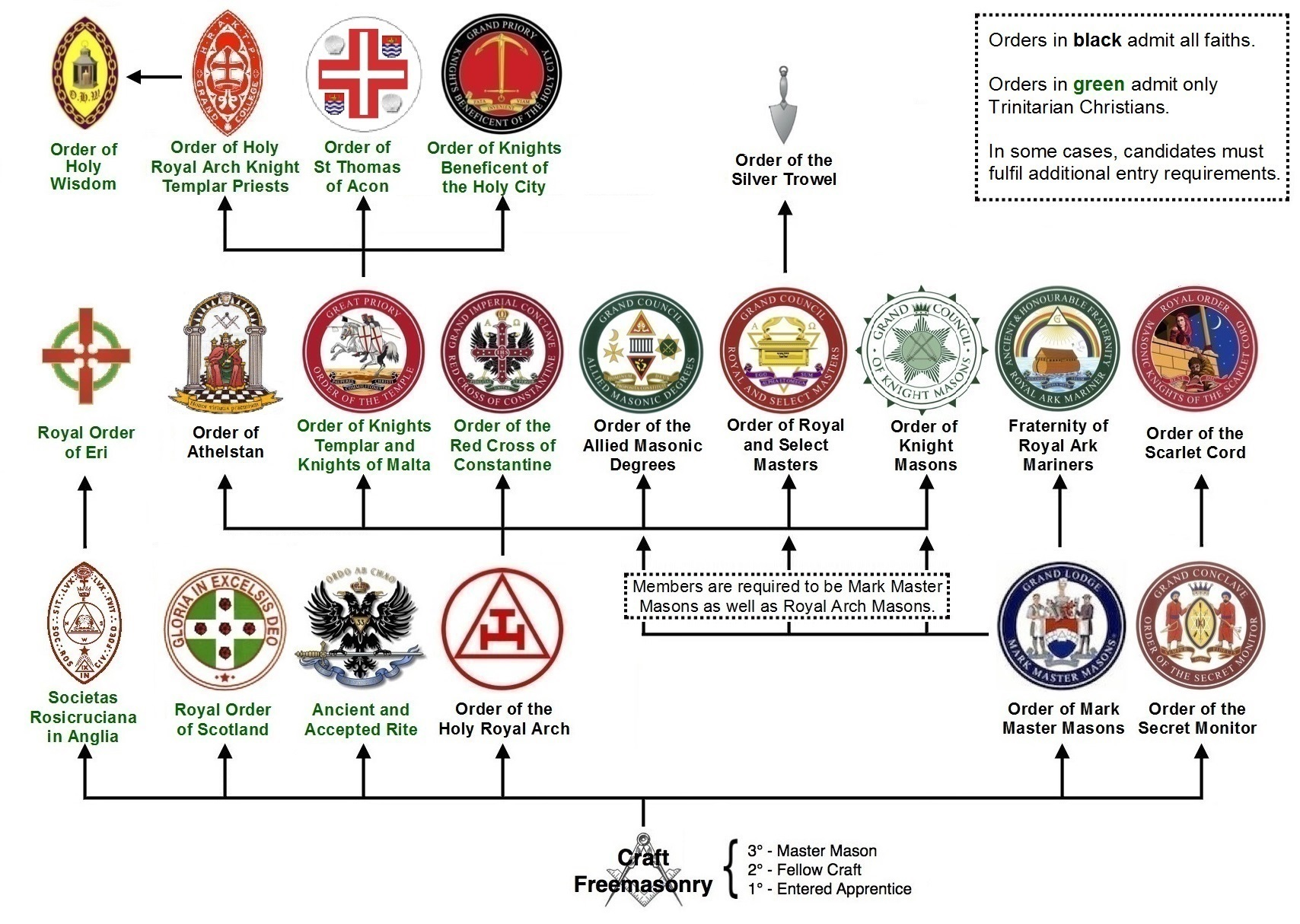
SRIA among the Masonic appendant bodies in England and Wales

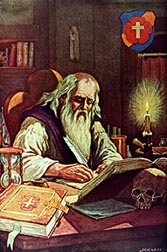
Frater Christian Rosenkreuz – Christian Rose Cross

The society requires that all aspirants for membership apply from the ranks of subscribing Master Masons of a Grand Lodge in amity with United Grand Lodge of England to declare a belief in the fundamental principles of the Trinitarian Christian faith and offers assistance to all its members in working out the great problems of nature and science.

== Structure and governance ==
The Society is subdivided into three Orders:

=== 1st Order ===
Members of the 1st Order(Fratres) meet in a College. A College is empowered to confer the first four degrees of the society which are known as Grades. A minimum of six months must elapse between the receipt of grades. However, the emphasis in the work of the society is learning, therefore every member is encouraged to deliver a paper of their own work on some topic of interest in open college.

First Order Grades
Grade	Grade Name
Grade I	Zelator
Grade II	Theoricus
Grade III	Practicus
Grade IV	Philosophus

=== 2nd Order ===
The Second Order is managed at a provincial level, headed by a Chief Adept and his deputy (Suffragan) who have jurisdiction over all first order Colleges within a Province. The Chief Adept is empowered to personally confer three further Grades at this level to deserving Fratres of Grade IV who have been a member of the Society for a minimum of four years.

Second Order Grades
Grade	Grade Name
Grade V	Adeptus Minor
Grade VI	Adeptus Major
Grade VII	Adeptus Exemptus

A minimum of one year must elapse between the receipt of grades at this level. A member can only serve as the Celebrant (Master) of a College of the First Order after receiving the Grade of Adeptus Exemptus.

=== 3rd Order ===
The Third Order is headed by the Supreme Magus, Senior Substitute Magus, and Junior Substitute Magus. Members of the second order who have given service to the Society and have been selected by the Supreme Magus for such advancement may be awarded these two further Grades.

Acting recipients receive Grade VIII or Grade IX, however, the Supreme Magus can also grant the grades honorifically (8° & 9°). All recipients receive the full ceremony, which is personally overseen by the Supreme Magus and his team.

Third Order Grades
Grade	Honorific	Grade Name
Grade VIII	8°	Magister
Grade IX	9°	Magus

== Regalia ==
Fraters within the First Order wear a jewel (medal) hanging on a green ribbon, the ribbon changes to yellow for Fraters within the Second Order.

When a frater becomes a Celebrant he wears a red robe, and thereafter he continues to wear a red robe.

Certain officers within a College wear regalia specific to their office.

== Supreme Magus ==
There have been 14 Supreme Magi since the founding of the SRIA:

Supreme Magus	Years of Office
Robert Wentworth Little	1869–1878
William Robert Woodman	1878–1891
William Wynn Westcott	1891–1925
W. J. Songhurst	1925–1939
Frank M. Rickard	1939–1956
W. R. Semken	1956–1969
Edward Varley Kayley	1969–1974
Donald Penrose	1974–1979
Norman C. Stamford	1979–1982
Alan G. Davies	1982–1994
Ronald E. Rowland	1994–2002
Andrew B. Stevenson	2002–2006
John Paternoster	2006–2019
Anthony W. Llewellyn	2019–present

== Known members ==
- William Robert Woodman
- William Wynn Westcott
- Kenneth R. H. Mackenzie
- Samuel Liddell "MacGregor" Mathers
- Arthur Edward Waite
- John Yarker
- Robert Felkin
- Frederick Bligh Bond

== SRIA Colleges ==
The SRIA has hundreds of Colleges worldwide, however it does not have a presence in the United States of America, Portugal, Italy, or Scotland, which are under the jurisdiction of the SRIA's sister societies.

A map of all SRIA colleges has been published on the official SRIA's official website. Examples of Colleges include:

- Bishop Wilkins College
- Mersey College
- Charles Darwin College
- John Dee College
- Woodman College (Halifax)
- Thomas B Whytehead College (Castleford)
- St John of Beverley College (Beverly)
- York College
- Middlesbrough College
- Newcastle College
- Pythagoras College

== Other organisations ==
There are multiple orders and societies that are associated with or inspired by the SRIA.

=== Societas Rosicruciana ===
The Societas Rosicruciana in Anglia has led to several Societas Rosicruciana organisations in different countries such as Scotland (SRIS), Portugal (SRIL), and The Americas (SRICF).

=== Royal Order of Eri ===
An invitational Irish order requiring membership of both Freemasonry and the SRIA. Members must be 5th grade or above in SRIA to be considered for invitation. The Masonic order is derived from an ancient Order in Ireland which was founded by the historic Kings of Ireland. The order's name relates to Erin the ancient Irish name for Ireland. In Canada and the United States, this order forms part of the Allied Masonic Degrees, but remains invite only.

=== Hermetic Order of the Golden Dawn ===
In 1888, three members of SRIA formed the Hermetic Order of the Golden Dawn, which removed the restriction on membership, allowing non-Christians, non-Freemasons, and women to join. A great deal of the SRIA structure survived in the new order, which went on to greatly influence the modern occult revival in the 20th century. While SRIA inspired several aspects, there is no active link between the SRIA and any modern-day Golden Dawn organisation.
