= William Wynn Westcott =

British Freemason and occult writer (1848–1925)

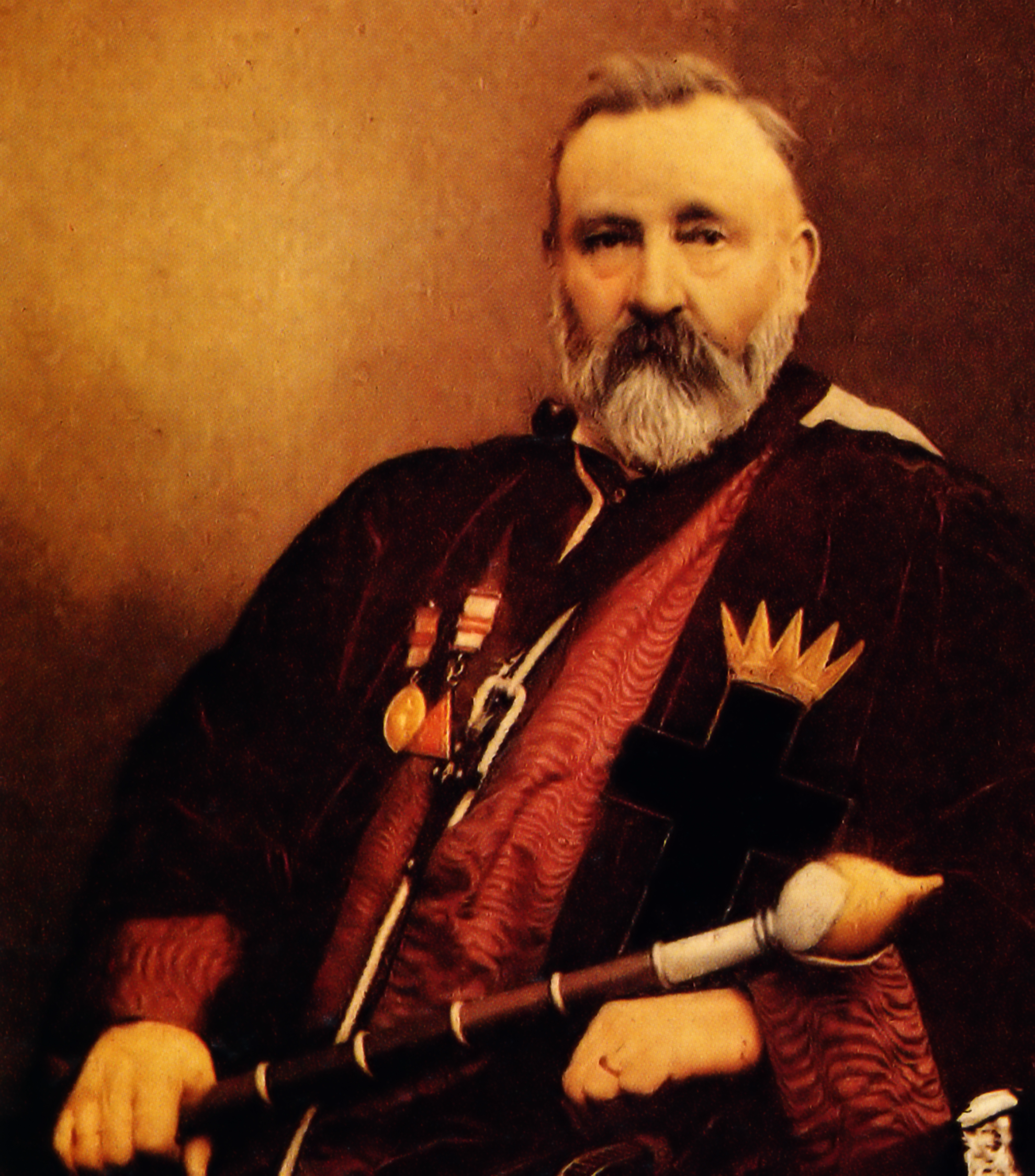
- Westcott in the garments of the SRIA (Rosicrucians)
- Born: 17 December 1848; Leamington, Warwickshire, England
- Died: 30 July 1925 (aged 76); Durban, Union of South Africa
- Occupation: Coroner
- Known for: Supreme Magus of the SRIA and founder of the Golden Dawn

William Wynn Westcott (17 December 1848 – 30 July 1925) was a British coroner, ceremonial magician, theosophist and Freemason born in Leamington, Warwickshire, England. He was a Supreme Magus (chief) of the S.R.I.A. and went on to co-found the Golden Dawn.

== Biography ==
He was a doctor of medicine.

In 1871 he became active in Freemasonry where he became Master of his home Lodge three years later and also the Quatuor Coronati research lodge (Master 1893–94).

In 1879 he moved to Hendon. In 1880 he began studying the Kabbalah and joined Societas Rosicruciana in Anglia. In 1882 he met Samuel Liddell Mathers.

=== Societas Rosicruciana in Anglia ===
Westcott became Supreme Magus of the SRIA with the death of William Robert Woodman.

=== The Golden Dawn ===
Westcott co-founded the Hermetic Order of the Golden Dawn with Samuel Liddell MacGregor Mathers and William Robert Woodman in 1887, using the motto V.H. Frater Sapere Aude.

Around this time, he was also active in the Theosophical Society, where he founded in 1891 the Adelphi Lodge in London WC.

In 1896, he abandoned public involvement with the Golden Dawn due to pressure regarding his job as a Crown Coroner, with which it was seen as an unseemly association. He continued to head the S.R.I.A. and later was involved with the Golden Dawn breakaway Stella Matutina.

=== Later years ===
He retired as a coroner after 1910, emigrated to the Union of South Africa in 1918, and died in Durban in 1925.

== Bibliography ==
- Suicide: Its History, Literature, Jurisprudence, Causation, and Prevention, 1885
- The Isiac Tablet of Cardinal Bembo, 1887
- Sepher Yetzirah, 1887 - (1911 third edition meant to be Collectanea Hermetica's Vol. X)
- Numbers, 1890 - (The 1902 second edition became the Collectanea Hermetica's Vol. IX)
- Hermetic Arcanum, 1893 - (Collectanea Hermetica Vol. I)
- The Divine Pymander, 1894 - (Collectanea Hermetica Vol. II)
- The Hermetic Art, 1894 - (Collectanea Hermetica Vol. III)
- AEsch Mezareph, 1894 - (Collectanea Hermetica Vol. IV)
- Somnium Scipionis, 1894 - (Collectanea Hermetica Vol. V)
- The Chaldaean Oracles, 1895 - (Collectanea Hermetica Vol. VI)
- Euphrates, 1896 - (Collectanea Hermetica Vol. VII)
- Egyptian Magic, 1896 - (Collectanea Hermetica Vol. VIII)
- The Magical Ritual of the Sanctum Regnum, 1896
- An Introduction to the Kabalah, 1910
- The Origin of the Rosicrucians and Freemasons
- A Lecture To Inquirers Into Theosophy And Practical Occultism
- History of the Rosicrucian Societies in Anglia

== Sources ==
- The Isiac Tablet of Cardinal Bembo By William Wynn Westcott
- The Golden Dawn By Israel Regardie
- The Magical Mason anthology of writings by William Wynn Westcott, edited and introduced by R.A. Gilbert (The Aquarian Press 1983)
