= Magical organization =

Organization for the practice of occult magic

A magical organization or magical order is an organization or secret society created for the practice of initiation into ceremonial or other forms of occult magic or to further the knowledge of magic among its members. Magical organizations can include Hermetic orders, esoteric societies, arcane colleges, and other groups which may use different terminology and similar though diverse practices.

== 18th century ==
The Order of the Golden and Rosy Cross (German: Orden des Gold- und Rosenkreutz) was a German Rosicrucian organization founded in the 1750s by Freemason and alchemist Hermann Fictuld. Candidates were expected to be Master Masons in good standing. Alchemy was to be a central study for members.

The Order of Knight-Masons Elect Priests of the Universe (French: Ordre des Chevaliers Maçons Élus Coëns de l’Univers) or simply Élus Coëns (Hebrew for "Elect Priests"), was a theurgical organization founded by Martinez de Pasqually in 1767. It spread in France in the latter part of the 18th century and is the first branch of the Martinist tradition.

== 19th century ==
Societas Rosicruciana in Anglia (Rosicrucian Society of England), or SRIA, is a Rosicrucian esoteric Christian order formed by Robert Wentworth Little in 1865. Members are confirmed from the ranks of subscribing Master Masons of a Grand Lodge in amity with United Grand Lodge of England. The structure and grades of this order were derived from the 18th-century Order of the Golden and Rosy Cross. It later became the grade system used in the Hermetic Order of the Golden Dawn.

The Hermetic Brotherhood of Luxor was an initiatic occult organization that first became public in late 1894, although according to an official document of the order it began its work in 1870. The Order's teachings drew heavily from the magico-sexual theories of Paschal Beverly Randolph, who influenced later groups such as Ordo Templi Orientis, although it is not clear whether or not Randolph himself was actually a member of the Order.

The Hermetic Order of the Golden Dawn has been credited with a vast revival of occult literature and practices and was founded in 1887 or 1888 by William Wynn Westcott, Samuel Liddell MacGregor Mathers and William Robert Woodman. The teachings of the Order include ceremonial magic, Enochian magic, Christian mysticism, Qabalah, Hermeticism, the paganism of ancient Egypt, theurgy, and alchemy. (Note: Smoley & Kinney (2006), pp. 102–103: "Founded in 1888, the Golden Dawn lasted a mere twelve years before it was shattered by personal conflicts. At its height it probably had no more than a hundred members. Yet its influence on magic and esoteric thought in the English-speaking world would be hard to overestimate.")

The Brotherhood of Myriam (Fratellanza di Myriam) is an Italian esoteric organization founded by Giuliano Kremmerz in 1899, blending Hermeticism with therapeutic practices and mystical traditions, rooted in Western esotericism. Its philosophy emphasizes spiritual healing, the study of ancient texts, and magical science.

Ordo Templi Orientis (O.T.O.) was founded by Carl Kellner in 1895, and is said to have been "reorganized and reconstituted" from the Hermetic Brotherhood of Light.

== 20th century ==
Alpha et Omega was a continuation of the Hermetic Order of the Golden Dawn. Following a rebellion of adepts in London and an ensuing public scandal which brought the name of the Order into disrepute, Mathers renamed the branch of the Golden Dawn remaining loyal to his leadership to "Alpha et Omega" sometime between 1903 and 1913. Another faction, led by Robert Felkin, became the Stella Matutina.

A∴A∴ was created in 1907 by Aleister Crowley and George Cecil Jones. It teaches magick and Thelema, which is a religion shared by several occult organizations. The main text of Thelema is The Book of the Law.

Ordo Templi Orientis was reworked by Aleister Crowley after he took control of the Order in the early 1920s. Ecclesia Gnostica Catholica functions as the ecclesiastical arm of Ordo Templi Orientis.

Builders of the Adytum (or B.O.T.A.) was created in 1922 by Paul Foster Case and was extended by Dr. Ann Davies. It teaches Hermetic Qabalah, astrology and occult tarot.

Also in 1922, after a falling-out with Moina Mathers and with Moina's consent, Dion Fortune left the Alpha et Omega to form an offshoot organization. This indirectly brought new members to the Alpha et Omega. In 1924, Fortune's group became known as the Fraternity of the Inner Light.

Fraternitas Saturni ('Brotherhood of Saturn') is a German magical order, founded in 1926 by Eugen Grosche (also known as Gregor A. Gregorius) and four others. It is one of the oldest continuously running magical groups in Germany. The lodge is, as Gregorius states, "concerned with the study of esotericism, mysticism, and magic in the cosmic sense".

The UR Group was an Italian esotericist association, founded around 1927 by intellectuals including Julius Evola, Arturo Reghini and Giovanni Colazza for the study of Traditionalism and Magic.

In 1954, Kenneth Grant began the work of founding the New Isis Lodge, which became operational in 1955. This became the Typhonian Ordo Templi Orientis (TOTO), which was eventually renamed to Typhonian Order.

The Church of Satan, a religious organization dedicated to Satanism as codified in The Satanic Bible, was established in 1966, by Anton LaVey, who was the Church's High Priest until his death in 1997. Church members may also participate in a system of magic which LaVey defined as greater and lesser magic. In 1975, Michael Aquino broke off from the Church of Satan and founded the Temple of Set.

The satanic Order of Nine Angles (O9A or ONA) was founded in the United Kingdom during the 1970s. Hope not Hate have lobbied to have O9A designated a terrorist organization.

In 1973 John Gibbs-Bailey and John Yeowell founded the Committee for the Restoration of the Odinic Rite or Odinist Committee in England. Yeowell had been a member of the British Union of Fascists in his youth and bodyguard to leader Oswald Mosley. In 1980 the organization changed its name to Odinic Rite. It is a white supremicist organization.

In 1976, James Lees founded the magical order O∴A∴A∴ in order to assist others in the pursuit of their own spiritual paths. The work of this order is based in English Qaballa.

In 1977, The Hermetic Order of the Golden Dawn, Inc. was founded by Chic Cicero in Columbus, Georgia. This Order is notable for having the only working Golden Dawn temple in the United States at the end of the 1970s, making it the oldest continuously operating Golden Dawn offshoot in the U.S.

The Sangreal Sodality is a spiritual brotherhood founded by British writer William G. Gray and Jacobus G. Swart in 1980.

During the last two decades of the 20th century, several organizations practicing chaos magic were founded. These include Illuminates of Thanateros, and Thee Temple ov Psychick Youth. These groups rely on the use of sigils. Their main texts include Liber Null (1978) and Psychonaut (1982), now published as a single book.

On the Vernal Equinox of 1990, Christopher Hyatt and David Cherubim founded the Thelemic Order of the Golden Dawn in Los Angeles. (Note: Greer (2003), p. 205: "Several of these new Golden Dawn orders were created by friends and students of Regardie in the United States. [...] [A]nother emerged in Arizona under the leadership of Christopher Hyatt.")

== 21st century ==
The Open Source Order of the Golden Dawn (OSOGD) was an esoteric community of magical practitioners, many of whom came from pagan backgrounds, founded by Sam Webster in 2002 and based on the principles of the open-source software movement. It was an initiatory teaching Order that drew upon the knowledge, experience, practices and spirit of the system of magical training and attainment developed by the original Hermetic Order of the Golden Dawn. The OSOGD ceased operating in September 2019.

The Atheopagan Society was founded in 2012 by Mark A. Green. Magic is practiced by atheopagans as a psychological technique to change their attitudes, emotions, and behaviors.

== Schools ==
The Grey School of Wizardry is an online school with a focus on secular esoteric education. Founded in 2004 by former headmaster Oberon Zell-Ravenheart, it operates primarily online and as a non-profit educational institution in California.

Arcanorium College is an online school of magic founded by chaos magician Peter J. Carroll.

== See also ==
- Phyllis Seckler – American occultist (1917–2004)
- Society of Guardians – Western esoteric order
- Temple of the Black Light – Satanic occult order
- The Horseman's Word – Fraternal secret society in Britain
