= Jessie Burns Parke =

American artist (1889–1964)

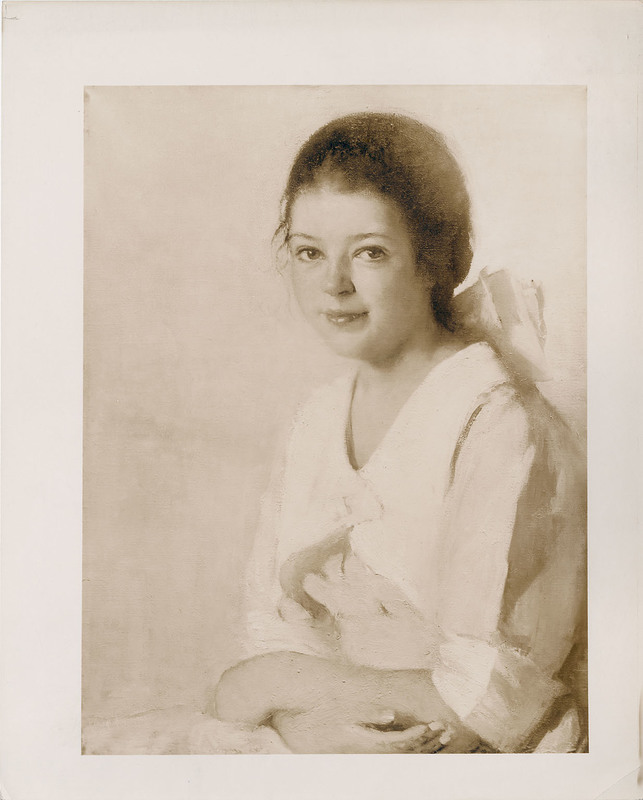
Rita, a 1928 painting by Parke

Jessie Burns Parke (December 2, 1889 – March 6, 1964), a notable American artist of the Boston School (painting), has become best known for creating the art for the cards in the Builders of the Adytum (B.O.T.A.) tarot card deck. An oil painter and watercolorist, Parke created both easel paintings and miniatures as well as graphics, etchings, and illustrations. She focused on landscapes, nature scenes, and portraits.

== Biography ==
Parke was born in Paterson, New Jersey, in 1889, the daughter of banker Harwood Burns Parke and Lavinia C. (nee Van Blarcom) Parke and granddaughter of Edwin Perry Parke and Anna (nee Serven) Parke. Her father at one time served as vice president of Paterson National Bank. Parke was the third of four children, with two older sisters and a younger brother.

As a schoolchild, Parke studied art with local teachers, in private school, and as a student of artist Mary Morgan.

Parke’s artistic talent garnered early recognition, with her entry in Cornell University’s emblem design competition winning an honorable mention in 1910.

Parke moved to Arlington, MA, in 1914. She studied at the New York School of Applied Design for Women (now Pratt Institute) and the Chase School (now Parsons School of Design). From 1920 - 1921, she studied at the Boston Museum of Fine Arts School (now the School of the Museum of Fine Arts at Tufts University). She also studied independently with artists Philip Leslie Hale, William James, and Frederick L. Bosley.

In 1921, Parke earned the prestigious two-year Paige Traveling Scholarship from the Boston Museum of Fine Arts School for travel to Europe. This support allowed her to study in Paris and travel through Europe until 1924.

Returning to Boston at that time, she established a studio at 121 Newbury Street. Parke also worked at Warren Kay Vantine’s Boston portrait photography studio, which opened in 1922 and was active through the 1940s.

During the Great Depression, Parke participated in Works Progress Administration (renamed the Work Projects Administration in 1939) programs, creating and exhibiting art. Her work appeared in a federal art gallery space in Boston as part of a 1936 painting exhibit, which later traveled throughout the state before organizers distributed the works to various public offices and institutions.

Besides Boston, during her career Parke worked in Paterson, NJ, although she lived in Arlington, Massachusetts for 50 years before she died. She belonged to the American Society of Miniature Painters and the Society of Independent Artists. She exhibited at the Albright Art Gallery; Arlington, Massachusetts, Women’s Club; Boston Art Club; Federation of Women’s Clubs in Massachusetts; Ogonquit, Maine, Art Center; Pennsylvania Academy of the Fine Arts, Philadelphia; Society of Independent Artists; and at the 1924 Salon d’Automne in Paris.

Parke won the Medal of Honor from the Pennsylvania Society of Miniature Painters in 1945 for her portrait, Enid, and received the Elizabeth Muhlhofer Award in 1953.

Parke's notable portrait sitters include Roscoe Pound, one-time dean of Northwestern University’s law school (now Northwestern University Pritzker School of Law) and later dean of Harvard Law School. She also created portraits of the Baroness de Bistram of Paris; Jessie Allen Fowler, vice president of the American Institute of Phrenology; Edward C. Jeffrey (E.C. Jeffrey), a Harvard University botanist; Amos Emerson Dolbear, chair of the Department of Astronomy and Physics, Tufts University; and Cardinal Richard Cushing of Boston.

Jessie Burns Parke operated her studio for many years. She died March 6, 1964.

== Builders of the Adytum (B.O.T.A.) tarot deck ==
The B.O.T.A. tarot deck, created by Parke and Paul Foster Case, differs most significantly from nearly all other modern decks created since the Waite-Smith deck because the images for the Major Arcana and court cards appear as black and white line drawings rather than paintings and the “pip” or Minor Arcana cards (also black line drawings) have repeating suit-based images for pentacles, cups, swords, and wands rather than full “story” or scene style designs. For example, the Seven of Swords card shows a geometric arrangement of seven identical swords (three swords in an upward pointing triangle above four swords forming a square) against a white background.

Case, an American occultist, first heard about tarot in 1900 and became a lifelong devotee. From 1918 to 1922, he belonged to Chicago’s Thoth-Hermes Lodge of The Rosicrucian Order of the Alpha et Omega, an order that replaced the Order of the Golden Dawn. There, he would have been exposed further to the order’s teachings and the famous Waite–Smith tarot deck created by Golden Dawn members A.E. Waite and Pamela Colman Smith.

Like the members of the Golden Dawn, Case saw tarot cards not as a method of fortune telling (which he criticized strongly) but as a means of divination for personal development to seek inner truth and higher consciousness.

Case later resigned from Alpha et Omega and moved east, spending time in his home state of New York and in Boston, where he organized his School of Ageless Wisdom (which supported work accomplished by B.O.T.A.). His teachings included tarot, and Case had written articles and books on the subject. He also wanted to create his own tarot deck, in part out of dissatisfaction with the Waite–Smith deck, especially what he saw as Waite’s deliberate obscurity, omissions, and personal biases.

To correct these errors, which he dubbed “blinds,” and have a deck he deemed acceptable for use with his students, Case, who lacked artistic skills beyond an ability to copy, engaged artist Jessie Burns Parke to create the images for a new deck, which launched in the late 1920s and remains available.

Parke created the images for this deck’s 22 Major Arcana in a visual style heavily indebted to Pamela Colman Smith’s pathbreaking artistic work in developing tarot images for the Waite–Smith deck (originally known as the Rider–Waite tarot deck). Parke also drew on other tarot decks for inspiration as well as the Golden Dawn teachings to insert Hebrew letters within images and otherwise embed esoteric wisdom visually.

Parke's drawings for the BOTA tarot deck differ most significantly from other decks in using Case's "Cube of Space" concept. This feature can be seen in Parke's drawings for the Emperor card.

Her version of the fifth trump, the Hierophant, likely is a portrait of Case. In addition, the plates in A History of the Occult Tarot include a 1931 drawing of Case by Parke.

It is possible Parke drew the Major Arcana first, with the suit and court cards following substantially later. All the images were made as drawings, without any color, as Case strongly believed students needed to hand color their own cards as part of their personal path and inner experience of spiritual development. The Case-Parke deck continues to be available solely as a black and white deck, with B.O.T.A continuing to offer watercolors and colored pencils through its catalog to promote this point of view.

Nevertheless, after Case’s death B.O.T.A. revised his tarot book to present the Case-Parke Major Arcana images in color. Also, the organization frequently uses colored versions of the Major Arcana for its products and on its website, publications, and other marketing materials.

B.O.T.A., however, makes no mention of Parke anywhere on its site nor in its catalog, even for entries specifically referencing the Case-Parke tarot deck.

== Education ==
- The Chase School (now Parsons School Of Design)
- New York School of Applied Design for Women (now Pratt Institute)
- Boston Museum of Fine Arts School (now School of the Museum of Fine Arts at Tufts University)

== Exhibitions ==
- Albright Art Gallery
- Arlington, Massachusetts, Women’s Club
- Boston Art Club
- Boston Museum of Fine Arts, 1926
- Federation of Women’s Clubs in Massachusetts
- Miniature Painters, Sculptors & Gravers Society of Washington, D.C., 1953 - 1955
- Ogonquit, Maine, Art Center
- Pennsylvania Academy of the Fine Arts 123rd Annual Exhibition: 1927 – 1928, included Parke’s portrait, Rita
- Pennsylvania Society of Miniature Painters Annual Exhibition of Miniatures: Parke exhibited annually and won the Medal of Honor in 1945 and the Elizabeth Muhlhofer Award in 1953
- Salon d’Automne, 1924, Paris
- Society of Independent Artists: 1925, 1927 – 1933; 1935

== Collections ==
Parke’s work can be found in several private collections:

- Harvard Art Museums, portrait of Edward Charles Jeffrey
- Northwestern University School of Law, portrait of Roscoe Pound
- Philadelphia Museum of Art
- Tufts University, portrait of Amos Emerson Dolbear, Chairman of the Department of Astronomy and Physics 1874

== Sources ==
- Augur, Emily E. Cartomancy and Tarot in Film: 1940-2010. Bristol, UK: Intellect Books, 2016.
- Boston Globe, April 5, 1939, and March 8, 1964.
- Collins, Jim L.; and Optiz, Glenn B., editors. Women Artists in America: 18th Century To The Present (1790-1980). Poughkeepsie, NY: Apollo, 1980.
- Davenport, Ray. Davenport’s Art Reference: The Gold Edition. Ltb Gordonsart Inc., 2005.
- Decker, Ronald; and Dummett, Michael. A History of the Occult Tarot. Abrams Press, 2013 and A History of the Occult Tarot 1870 - 1970. London: Gerald Duckworth & Co. Ltd., 2002.
- Drury, Nevill; and Tillett, Gregory. Illustrated by Elizabeth Trafford Smith. The Occult Sourcebook. New York: Routledge, 2020.
- Dunbier, Lonnie Pierson (Editor). The Artists Bluebook: 34,000 North American Artists to March 2005, 2005.
- Falk, Peter Hastings (Editor). Annual Exhibition Record, 1914-68. Philadelphia: Pennsylvania Academy of Fine Arts (exhibition catalog), 1989.
- Falk, Peter Hastings (Editor). Who Was Who in American Art, 1564-1975. Madison, CT: Sound View Press, 1999.
- Kaplan, Stuart R.. The Encyclopedia of Tarot Volume I, Stamford, CT: U.S. Games Inc., 1978.
- Mallett, Daniel Trowbridge. Index of Artists: International-Biographical. New York: R.R. Bowker Co., 1935.
- Marlor, Clark S. The Society of Independent Artists Exhibition Record, 1917-1944 (exhibition catalog). Madison, CT: Falk Art Reference, 1984.
- Nash, John F., "The Origins and Evolution of the Tarot." Esoteric Quarterly 12, no. 4 (2017): 67-76.
- Nelson, William; and Shriner, Charles A. History of Paterson and Its Environs (The Silk City). New York and Chicago: Lewis Historical Publishing Company, 1920.
- Opitz, Glenn B. Dictionary of American Artists, 1982.
- Opitz, Glenn B. (Editor). Mantle Fielding’s Dictionary of American Painters, Sculptors & Engravers. Apollo Books, 1986.
- Petteys, Chris, with Gustow, Hazel; Olin, Ferris; and Ritchie, Verna. Dictionary of Women Artists: An International Dictionary of Women Artists Born Before 1900. Boston: G.K. Hall, 1985.
- Pierce, Patricia Jobe. Edmund C. Tarbell and the Boston School of Painting (1889-1980). Hingham, MA: Pierce Galleries, Inc., 1980.
- Pollack, Rachel. Seventy-Eight Degrees of Wisdom. San Francisco: Thorsons, 1997.
- Pollack, Rachel. The Forest of Souls: A Walk Through the Tarot. St. Paul, MN: Llewellyn Publications, 2003.
- United States Work Projects Administration. Government Aid During the Depression to Professional, Technical and Other Service Workers. Washington, D.C.: U.S. Government, 1936.
