= Numerology =

Mystical properties of numbers

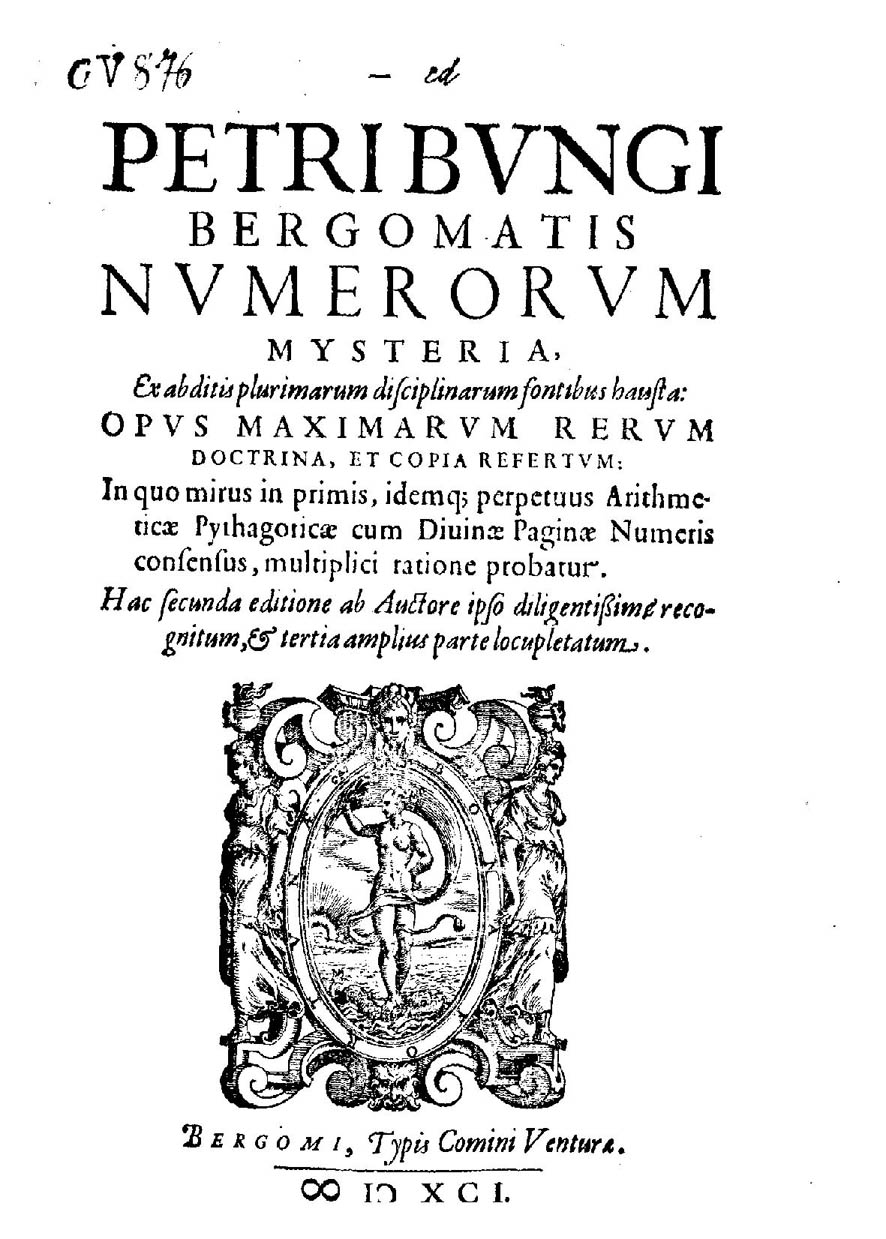
Numerorum mysteria (1591), a treatise on numerology by Pietro Bongo and his most influential work in Europe

Numerology (known before the 20th century as arithmancy) is the belief in an occult, divine or mystical relationship between a number and metaphysical phenomena or ideas. It is also the study of the numerical value, via an alphanumeric system, of the letters in words and names (e.g. gematria). When numerology is applied to a person's name, it is a form of onomancy. It is often associated with astrology and other divinatory arts.

Number symbolism is an ancient and pervasive aspect of human thought, deeply intertwined with religion, philosophy, mysticism, and mathematics. Different cultures and traditions have assigned specific meanings to numbers, often linking them to divine principles, cosmic forces, or natural patterns.

== Etymology ==
The term arithmancy is derived from two Greek words – arithmos (meaning 'number') and manteia (meaning 'divination'). "Αριθμομαντεία" (arithmomanteía) Arithmancy is thus the study of divination through numbers. Although the word "arithmancy" dates back to the 1570s, the word "numerology" was not recorded in English before c. 1907.

== History ==
The practice of gematria, assigning numerical values to words and names and imputing those values with religious meaning, dates back to antiquity. An Assyrian inscription from the 8th century BC, commissioned by Sargon II declares "the king built the wall of Khorsabad 16,283 cubits long to correspond with the numerical value of his name". Rabbinic literature used gematria to interpret passages in the Hebrew Bible.

The practice of using alphabetic letters to represent numbers developed in the Greek city of Miletus, and is thus known as the Milesian system. Early examples include vase graffiti dating back to the 6th century BCE. Aristotle wrote that the Pythagorean tradition, founded in the 6th century by Pythagoras of Samos, practiced isopsephy, the Greek predecessor of Hebrew gematria. Pythagoras was a contemporary of the philosophers Anaximander, Anaximenes, and the historian Hecataeus, all of whom lived in Miletus, across the sea from Samos. The Milesian system was in common use by the reign of Alexander the Great (336–323 BCE) and was adopted by other cultures during the subsequent Hellenistic period. It was officially adopted in Egypt during the reign of Ptolemy II Philadelphus (284–246 BCE).

By the late 4th century AD, following the Edict of Thessalonica in 380 AD and the subsequent enforcement of Nicene Christianity under Theodosius I, departures from the beliefs of the state church were classified as civil violations within the Roman Empire. Numerology, referred to as isopsephy, remained in use in conservative Greek Orthodox circles, particularly in mystical and theological contexts.

Some alchemical theories were closely related to numerology. For example, Arab alchemist Jabir ibn Hayyan (died c. 806−816) framed his experiments in an elaborate numerology based on the names of substances in the Arabic language.

Numerology is prominent in Sir Thomas Browne's 1658 literary discourse The Garden of Cyrus. Throughout its pages, the author attempts to demonstrate that the number five and the related quincunx pattern can be found throughout the arts, in design, and in nature, particularly botany.

Some approaches to understanding the meanings of the Qur'an (the book of Muslims) include the understanding of numerical meanings, numerical symbols and their combination with purely textual approaches.

== Methods ==
=== Alphanumeric systems ===
Various numerology systems assign numerical value to the letters of an alphabet. Examples include the Abjad numerals in Arabic, Hebrew numerals, Armenian numerals, Cyrillic numerals and Greek numerals. The traditional Jewish practice of assigning mystical meaning to words based on their numerical values, and on connections between words of equal value, is known as gematria.

The Mandaean number alphasyllabary is also used for numerology (Mandaic: gmaṭ aria). The Book of the Zodiac is an important Mandaean text on numerology.

=== Pythagorean method ===
In the Pythagorean method (which uses a kind of place-value for number-letter attributions, as do the ancient Hebrew and Greek systems), the letters of the modern Latin alphabet are assigned numerical values 1 through 9.

=== Agrippan method ===
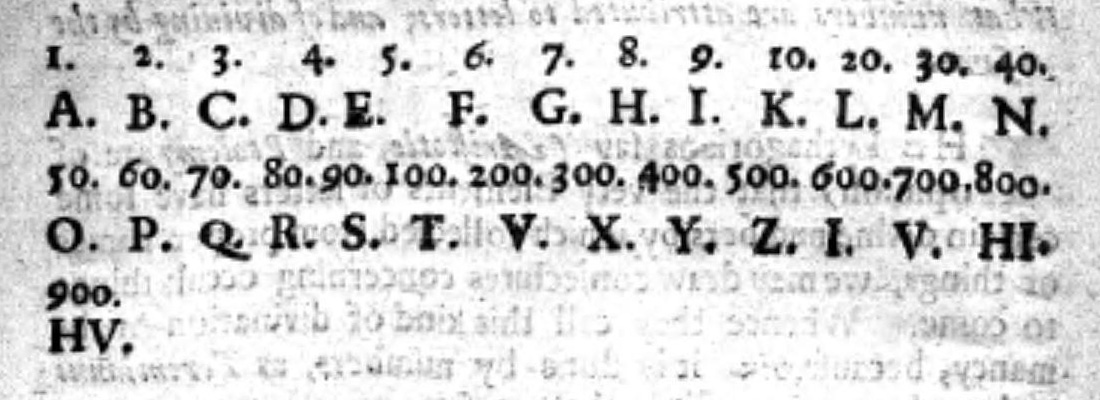
Agrippa's numerology table as published in Three Books of Occult Philosophy

Heinrich Cornelius Agrippa applied the concept of arithmancy to the classical Latin alphabet in the 16th century in Three Books of Occult Philosophy. He mapped the letters as follows (in accordance with the Latin alphabet's place-value at that time):

1	2	3	4	5	6	7	8	9
A	B	C	D	E	F	G	H	I
10	20	30	40	50	60	70	80	90
K	L	M	N	O	P	Q	R	S
100	200	300	400	500	600	700	800	900
T	V (Note: When representing the u sound, as in Ulysses)	X	Y	Z	I (Note: When representing the j sound, as in John)	V (Note: When representing the v sound, as in Valentine)	HI (Note: When representing the j sound, as in Jerome)	HV (Note: When representing the w sound, as in Wilhelm)

Note that the letters U, J, and W were not commonly considered part of the Latin alphabet at the time.

=== Angel numbers ===
So-called angel numbers, as defined by Doreen Virtue and Lynnette Brown in 2004, are numbers consisting of repeating digits, such as 111 or 444. As of 2023, a number of popular media publications had published articles suggesting that these numbers have numerological significance. After converting to Christianity, Doreen gave an interview with The Cut in 2024 and renounced the concept of angel numbers saying: "It’s garbage. I regret it, and I'm sorry that I made them."

== English systems ==
There are various systems of English Qabalah or numerology. These systems interpret the letters of the Roman script or English alphabet via an assigned set of numerological significances. English Qaballa, on the other hand, refers specifically to a Qabalah supported by a system discovered by James Lees in 1976.

The first system of English gematria was used by the poet John Skelton in 1523 in his poem "The Garland of Laurel". The next reference to an English gematria found in the literature was made by Willis F. Whitehead in 1899 in his book The Mystic Thesaurus, in which he describes a system he called "English Cabala".

In 1952, John P. L. Hughes published The Hidden Numerical Significance of the English Language, or, Suggestive Gematria, based on his lecture delivered at Holden Research Circle on July 4, 1952. A system related to the Spiritualist Agasha Temple of Wisdom was described by William Eisen in his two volume The English Cabalah (1980–82).

William G. Gray proposes another system in his 1984 book Concepts of Qabalah, more recently republished as Qabalistic Concepts. This system includes correspondence attributions of the English letters to the positions on the Tree of Life. Michael Bertiaux described a system called Angelic Gematria in his The Voudon Gnostic Workbook (1989). David Rankine described a system of English gematria using prime numbers which he calls Prime Qabalah in his book Becoming Magick (2004).

A system known as Trigrammaton Qabalah (TQ), was first published by R. Leo Gillis in 1996, including a gematria of the English alphabet based on one of the Holy Books of Thelema written by Aleister Crowley in 1907, called Liber Trigrammaton. A primary feature of this qabalah is a new understanding of the Cube of Space and its 26 components of edges, faces, and vertices, which equal the number of letters in the English alphabet.

== In popular culture ==
In modern culture, numerology continues to influence personal and public life. For example, Australian MP Sussan Ley credibly altered the spelling of her own name according to numerological advice, believing it would bring excitement to her life, a story widely reported in 2025.

Similarly, celebrities like Gwyneth Paltrow have marked entry into a "9-year" numerological cycle signifying transformation and closure, with symbolic gestures such as posting rain-imagery associated with personal renewal.

The outbreak of the Russo-Georgian War on 8 August 2008 (08.08.08) fed conspiracy theories due to the "obviously mystical coincidence of numbers" in the date. (Some circles simply refer to that war using the label "the three eights" (Russian: три восьмёрки).)

== Related uses ==
Scientific theories are sometimes labeled "numerology" if their primary inspiration appears to be a set of patterns rather than scientific observations. This colloquial use of the term is quite common within the scientific community and it is mostly used to dismiss a theory as questionable science.

The best known example of "numerology" in science involves the coincidental resemblance of certain large numbers that intrigued mathematical physicist Paul Dirac, mathematician Hermann Weyl and astronomer Arthur Stanley Eddington. These numerical coincidences refer to such quantities as the ratio of the age of the universe to the atomic unit of time, the number of electrons in the universe, and the difference in strengths between gravity and the electric force for the electron and proton. (See also Fine-tuned universe).

Wolfgang Pauli was also fascinated by the appearance of certain numbers, including 137 (a prime number), in physics.

British mathematician I. J. Good wrote:

There have been a few examples of numerology that have led to theories that transformed society: see the mention of Kirchhoff and Balmer in Good (1962), p. 316 [...] and one can well include Kepler on account of his third law. It would be fair enough to say that numerology was the origin of the theories of electromagnetism, quantum mechanics, gravitation. [...] So I intend no disparagement when I describe a formula as numerological.

When a numerological formula is proposed, then we may ask whether it is correct. [...] I think an appropriate definition of correctness is that the formula has a good explanation, in a Platonic sense, that is, the explanation could be based on a good theory that is not yet known but 'exists' in the universe of possible reasonable ideas.

== See also ==
- Biblical numerology – Numeric symbolism in biblical texts
- Enneagram of Personality – Model of the human psyche used as a personality typology
- Frequency illusion – Kind of cognitive bias
- Number of the beast – Number associated with the Beast of Revelation
- Numbers in Norse mythology
- Numerology and the Church Fathers – Numeric symbolism in biblical texts
- Sacred geometry – Symbolic and sacred meanings ascribed to certain geometric shapes
- Scatter table – Associative array for storing key–value pairs
- Synchromysticism – Belief system attributing meaning to coincidences
- Synchronicity – Jungian concept of the meaningfulness of acausal coincidences
