= Enochian magic =

System of Renaissance magic

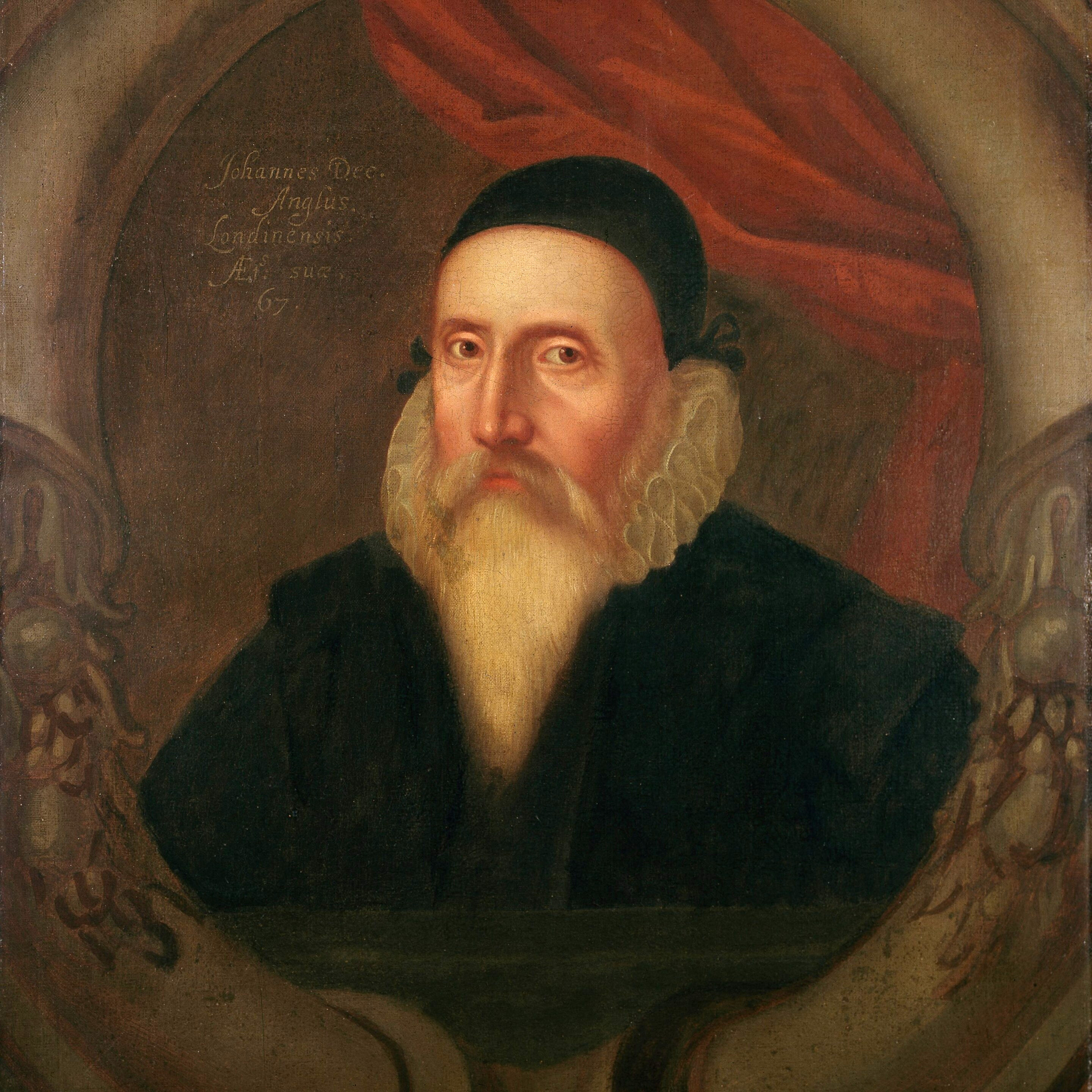
A 16th-century portrait of John Dee by an unknown artist (Note: According to Fell Smith (1909), p. 15, it was painted when Dee was 67. It belonged to a grandson, Rowland Dee, and later to Elias Ashmole, who left it to Oxford University.)

Enochian magic is a system of Renaissance magic developed by John Dee and Edward Kelley and adopted by more modern practitioners. The origins of this esoteric tradition are rooted in documented collaborations between Dee and Kelley, encompassing the revelation of the Enochian language and script, which Dee wrote were delivered to them directly by various angels during their mystical interactions. Central to the practice is the invocation and command of various spiritual beings.

Dee's journals detail the two men's interactions with these entities, accompanied by the intricate Enochian script and tables of correspondences. They believed that these revelations granted them access to insights concealed within Liber Logaeth, often referred to as the Book of Enoch.

Enochian magic, as practiced by Dee and Kelley, involved a range of rituals and ceremonies designed to evoke angelic and other spiritual entities. These practices, meticulously recorded in Dee's journals, aimed to harness the energies and wisdom of these entities for transformative and practical purposes. This Renaissance occult tradition involved the interaction between human practitioners and the ethereal realm, characterized by the use of the Enochian language and symbols.

The Hermetic Order of the Golden Dawn would later integrate elements of Enochian magic into its system. This adaptation reignited interest in Enochian practices, further embedding them within broader Western esoteric traditions. Debates have arisen regarding the accuracy and interpretation of these adaptations, one example of the evolution of Enochian magic across diverse historical and contemporary contexts.

== Background ==
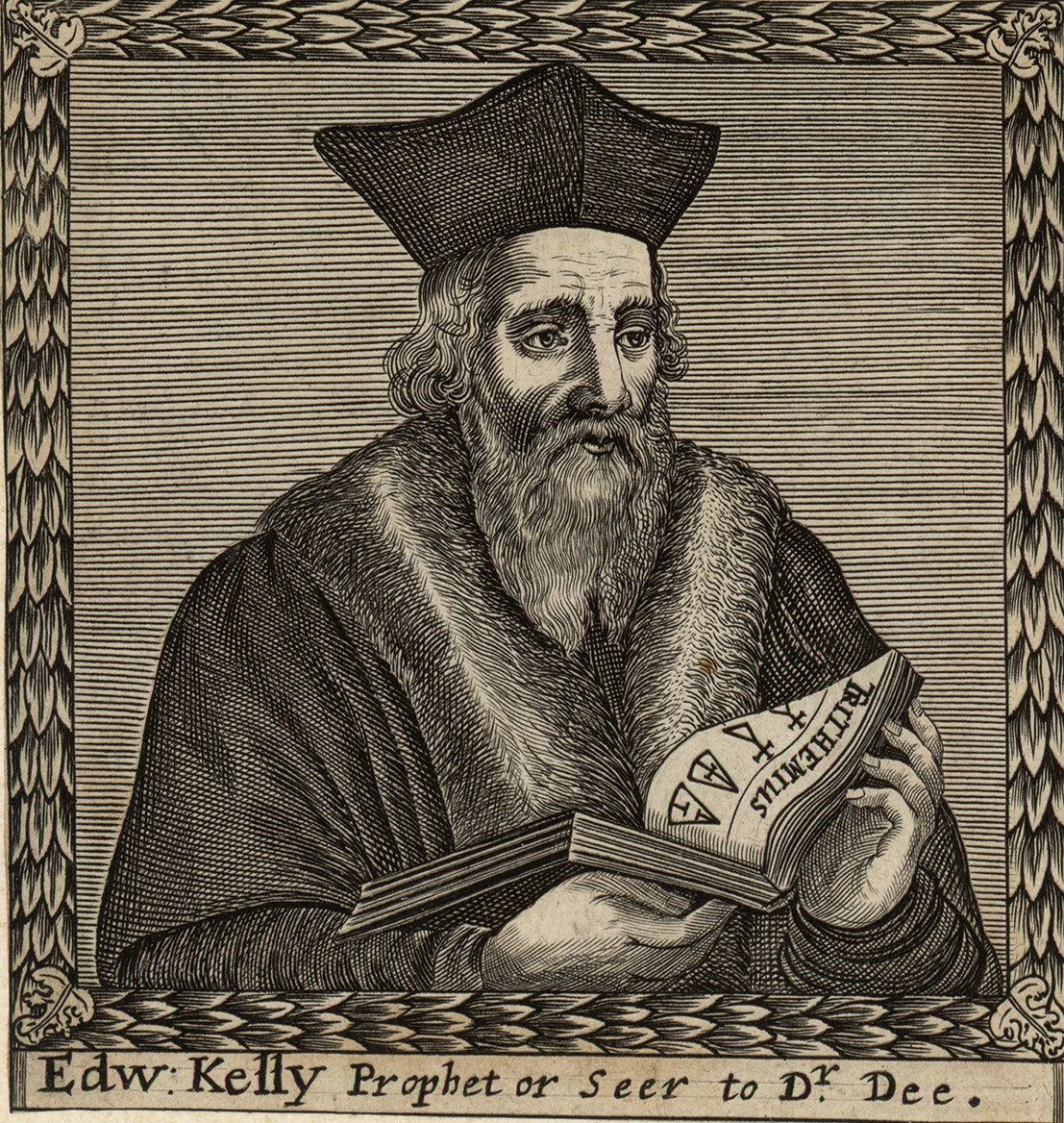
Edward Kelley

In the early 1580s, John Dee's pursuit of understanding the secrets of nature left him dissatisfied with his progress. Seeking a more profound wisdom encompassing both natural and artificial truths, Dee's journey evolved into a spiritual exploration. Dee wrote:

I have from my youth up, desired and prayed unto God for pure and sound wisdom and understanding of truths natural and artificial, so that God's wisdom, goodness, and power bestowed in the frame of the world might be brought in some bountiful measure under the talent of my capacity... So for many years and in many places, far and near, I have sought and studied many books in sundry languages, and have conferred with sundry men, and have laboured with my own reasonable discourse, to find some inkling, gleam, or beam of those radical truths. But after all my endeavours I could find no other way to attain such wisdom but by the Extraordinary Gift, and not by any vulgar school, doctrine, or human invention. (Note: From Dee's Preface to Sloane MS 3188, as quoted in James (1983), p. xiii)

In response, Dee turned his attention toward the supernatural as a means to acquire the knowledge he sought. He used scrying, employing individuals known as scryers or crystal-gazers to act as intermediaries between himself and angelic beings. Dee's initial attempts with various scryers proved underwhelming, until he encountered Edward Kelley in 1582. Operating under the pseudonym Edward Talbot due to a forgery conviction, Kelley's remarkable abilities caught Dee's attention and impressed him greatly.

Dee enlisted Kelley's services, focusing his energies on supernatural pursuits. These spiritual interactions were steeped in Christian piety and followed periods of purification, prayer, and fasting. Dee held a steadfast belief in the potential benefits these efforts could bring to humanity. Kelley's role in channeling angelic communications resulted in a voluminous output, with the angels dictating several books, often in a previously unknown language termed "Angelical", now more commonly called Enochian. Kelley's contributions laid the groundwork for Enochian magic, a system that intertwined mysticism and practical ritual within the landscape of Renaissance occultism.

=== Angelical ===
Called Angelical by Dee, the Enochian language is an occult constructed language — said by its originators to have been received from angels — recorded in the private journals of John Dee and his colleague Edward Kelley in late 16th-century England. The term "Enochian" comes from Dee's assertion that the Biblical patriarch Enoch had been the last human (before Dee and Kelley) to know the language.

The language found in Dee's and Kelley's journals encompasses a limited textual corpus. Linguist Donald Laycock, an Australian Skeptic, studied the Enochian journals and argues against any extraordinary features. The phonology and grammar resemble English, though the translations are not sufficient to work out any regular morphology. Some Enochian words resemble words and proper names in the Bible, but most have no apparent etymology.

There have been several compilations of Enochian words made to form Enochian dictionaries. A scholarly study is Donald Laycock's The Complete Enochian Dictionary. Also useful is Vinci's Gmicalzoma: An Enochian Dictionary. Israel Regardie's Enochian dictionary is reprinted in Crowley, Duquette, and Hyatt, Enochian World of Aleister Crowley.

Since Dee is known to have been a spy for Elizabeth I's court, there are interpretations of his Angelic manuscripts as cryptographic documents - most likely polyalphabetic ciphers - designed to disguise political messages. (Note: See Langford (1978).)

== Manuscript sources ==
At the heart of Enochian magic's origin are manuscripts attributed to John Dee and Edward Kelley, notably the Five Books of Mystery and Liber Logaeth. These texts serve as pivotal foundations, encoding the intricate language, symbolism, and rituals intrinsic to Enochian magic.

These manuscripts have been enriched by a succession of scholars and practitioners. Individuals like Thomas Rudd (1583?–1656), Elias Ashmole (1617–1692), Samuel Liddell MacGregor Mathers (1854–1918), William Wynn Westcott (1848–1925), Aleister Crowley (1875–1947), and Israel Regardie (1907–1985) have contributed as guardians and commentators. As magicians, their roles extend beyond preservation, including writing commentaries, making adaptations, and revealing insights that have expanded the views on Enochian magic.

=== Five Books of Mystery ===
The Five Books of Mystery (Mysteriorum Libri Quinque) are documented within the manuscript Sloane MS 3188, a repository of the 'actions' or mystical practices detailed in Liber Logaeth. This manuscript served as a diary spanning from 22 December 1581 to 23 May 1583. It encompasses the first five Books of Mystery, along with an Appendix, notably concluding where Casaubon's A True and Faithful Relation commences. There are two transcripts of this manuscript available today: from Joseph Peterson and C. L. Whitby. The Five Books of Mystery serve as a comprehensive guide to Enochian magic, encompassing language, symbolism, rituals, and practical techniques. The five books are:

1. Primus: The Magick of Enoch serves as an introduction to the celestial language known as Angelical, forming the bedrock of Enochian magic. Within its pages, foundational Enochian alphabets are revealed, allowing communication with angelic entities through the use of Angelic Keys. This book establishes the linguistic basis for Enochian magical operations, setting the stage for further exploration into the mystical realm as presented in the Five Books of Mystery.
2. Secundus: The Mystical Heptarchy: This book delves deeper into the Angelical language, unveiling the intricate Great Table—an essential matrix of letters and symbols pivotal to Enochian magical workings. Within its pages, the concept of the Thirty Æthyrs is introduced, presenting metaphysical planes that serve as conduits for practitioners to interact with angelic beings. This book expands the realm of Enochian magic, providing a framework for engaging with celestial hierarchies and exploring the mystical dimensions of existence.
3. Tertius: The Forty-Eight Angelic Keys shifts the focus to the construction and symbolism of temples. This book offers insights into their integral role within Enochian magic. It outlines the design and significance of temples, emphasizing sacred geometry and symbolism as vehicles for spiritual transformation. By exploring the intricate interplay between architecture and mysticism, this book provides practitioners with a practical understanding of how temples can serve as spaces for connecting with higher realms and channeling divine energies.
4. Quartus: Earthly Knowledge, Aid & Victory: This book explores the symbolism of Elemental Tablets and Watchtowers, shedding light on the interplay between metaphysical constructs and natural forces. It deciphers the intricate connections between classical elements and earthly energies, enhancing practitioners' comprehension of the intricate web woven by Enochian magic. Through the exploration of these symbols, individuals gain a deeper insight into the harmonious interaction between mystical and natural realms, enriching their journey into the profound intricacies of Enochian magic.
5. Quintus: The Angels of the Four Quarters focuses on practical applications of Enochian magic. It offers rituals and ceremonies grounded in the Angelical language and its symbolism. This book serves as a guide bridging the gap between mystical theory and practical implementation in esoteric pursuits.

=== Liber Logaeth ===
Liber Loagaeth (Note: or Liber Logaeth as the title has been so frequently misprinted.) (lit. Book of the Speech of God, also known as Liber Mysteriorum, Sextus et Sanctus [The Sixth and Sacred Book of the Mysteries], referred to by Dee as The Book of Enoch) (1583) is preserved in the British Library mostly within what are known as the Sloane manuscripts, chiefly Sloane MS 3189 (but parts of Sloane MS 3188 and the Cotton MS Appendix I also contain the beginning and end of the book, with some copying of material in Sloane MS 3188 appearing in Sloane MS 3189).

Written up by Edward Kelley, it is composed of 73 folios (18 from Sloane MS 3188, 54 from Sloane MS 3189, and 1 (text only) from Cotton MS Appendix I). The book contains 96 complex magical grids of letters (94 of which are 49×49 grids of letters, one of which is a table composed of 49 rows of text, and one of which is a table of 40 rows of text and 9 rows of 49 letters). The final folio from Cotton MS Appendix I was 21 words consisting of 112 letters, which according to the text, was apparently able to be somehow reduced to 105 letters and arranged into five 3x7 tables, three on the front and two on the back (cf. Cotton MS Appendix I).

It is from Liber Logaeth that Dee and Kelley derived the 48 Calls or Keys (see below), and in which are concealed the keys to the Mystical Heptarchy, a related magical work by Dee. Dee himself left little information on his Sixth Holy Book apart from saying that it contained 'The Mysterie of our Creation, The Age of many years, and the conclusion of the World' and that the first page in the book signified Chaos. (Note that the title, The Book of Enoch, attributed to the text of Liber Logaeth, is not to be confused with the apocryphal Book of Enoch, which was considered lost in Dee's time.)

=== Other manuscripts ===
Another manuscript is Sloane MS 3191, which comprises: 48 Angelic Keys; The Book of Earthly Science, Aid and Victory; On the Mystic Heptarchy; and Invocations of the Good Angels.

Two further manuscripts from Dee and Kelley's workings pertain to Enochian magic:

1. Cotton MS Appendix XLVI Part I is the diary for 28 May 1583 – 15 August 1584 inclusive: The Sixth (and Sacred) Parallel Book of the Mysteries (not to be confused with "The Sixth and Sacred Book of the Mysteries", which is part of Liber Logaeth – see above) and "The Seventh Book of the Mysteries" (Kraków), beginning where A True and Faithful Relation begins. It includes the arrival of Prince Adalbert Laski, the journey to Kraków and the dictation of the 48 Calls or Keys (including descriptions of the 91 Parts of the Earth), as well as the Vision of the Four Watchtowers and also the Great Table.
2. Cotton MS Appendix XLVI Part II is the diary for 15 August 1584 – 23 May 1587 (and 20 March – 7 September 1607) inclusive: The Book of Praha, The Royal Stephanic Mysteries, The Puccian Action, The Book of Resurrection, The Third Action of Trebon and the remaining Spirit Actions at Mortlake in 1607, ending where A True and Faithful Relation ends. (It may be seen that Casaubon's A True and Faithful Relation is equivalent to the Cotton MS Appendix in toto, i.e. Dee and Kelley's diaries from 28 May 1585-23 Sept 1607).

Meric Casaubon's 1659 edition of part of these diaries (Cotton Appendix MS XLVI), entitled A True & Faithful Relation of What Passed for Many Yeers between John Dee and Some Spirits, contains notorious transcription errors which in some cases were transmitted through many subsequent republications of the Dee/Kelly material; Casaubon's edition was intended to discredit Dee and Kelly by accusing them of dealing with the Christian Devil. An expanded facsimile edition of Casaubon was published by Magickal Childe in 1992.

Dee and Kelley's surviving manuscripts later came into the possession of Elias Ashmole, who preserved them and made copies of some, along with annotations.

== The system ==
The Enochian magical system is a structured framework consisting of various essential components which are outlined in Aleister Crowley's Liber Chanokh. Key elements include the Elemental Tablets (including the "Tablet of Union"), the Angelical Keys, the Great Table (made up of the 4 Elemental Tablets and incorporating the Tablet of Union), and specific temple furnishings. These components provide the foundation for practitioners engaged in spiritual exploration within the Enochian tradition. The Angelical Keys of the 30 Aethyrs function as evocations to access mystical realms, while the Great Table symbolically represents the universe. The system also involves the setup of a designated temple space with requisite magical tools.

=== The Great Table ===
Enochian magic encompasses a system of symbolism and spiritual exploration, primarily centered around the Elemental Tablets and related elements. The core of this magical system is the Great Table, which consists of four Elemental Tablets that symbolize the classical elements of earth, air, fire, and water. These tablets are inhabited by various spiritual beings and entities.

Within the Great Table, there is a structured hierarchy of spiritual entities. These include the Three Holy Names, representing potent sources of divine authority, and a Great Elemental King who governs each of the Elemental Tablets. Supporting these are the Six Seniors (also known as Elders), comprising a total of 24 figures reminiscent of the Twenty-Four Elders mentioned in the biblical Book of Revelation. Additionally, there are two Divine Names associated with the Calvary Cross: Kerubim, often depicted as angelic beings linked to the fixed zodiac signs, and Sixteen Lesser Angels, each with distinct roles and attributes.

Further intricacies emerge within the Elemental Tablets, which are divided into four sub-quadrants or sub-angles. These contain the names of archangels and angels responsible for overseeing specific quarters of the world, effectively populating the universe, both seen and unseen, with intelligent spiritual beings.

At the heart of each Elemental Tablet lies the Great Central Cross, consisting of two central vertical columns known as Linea Patris and Linea Filii, and a central horizontal line called Linea Spiritus Sancti. The exact significance of the Great Central Cross can vary among interpretations of Enochian magic.

Completing the symbolic representation of the five classical elements is the Tablet of Union, often referred to as the Black Cross. This grid of twenty squares is derived from within the Great Central Cross and serves to embody the element of Spirit.

=== The Thirty Æthyrs ===
The Thirty Aethyrs are an integral part of the Enochian magical system, representing a sequence of spiritual planes or realms that practitioners explore as they ascend from 30 (TEX, the lowest) to 1 (LIL, the highest). In the practice of Enochian magic, magicians document their visions, experiences, and impressions within each successive Aethyr, marking their progression through this mystical hierarchy.

One notable feature of the Aethyrs is the presence of "Governors". Each of the 30 Aethyrs is inhabited by three Governors, with the exception of TEX, which has four, totaling 91 Governors across the entire system. These Governors are considered angelic or spiritual entities associated with the Aethyrs and are believed to hold significant knowledge and power within their respective realms.

The Governors are distinguished by their unique sigils, which are mystical symbols representing their presence and authority. A crucial part of Enochian magical practice involves tracing these sigils onto the Great Tablet, a key tool in the Enochian system. By inscribing the sigils on the Tablet, magicians establish a connection with the Governors and the energies associated with each Aethyr.

=== The Angelical Keys ===
The Angelical Keys, also known as the Calls or Enochian Keys, are a central component of Enochian magic. These keys are a series of rhetorical exhortations which function as evocations when read in the Enochian language. They are used to affect the "opening of 'gates' into various mystical realms." These realms may include elemental realms, sub-elemental realms, or the Thirty Aethyrs, depending on which key is used.

There are a total of nineteen Angelical Keys in Enochian magic. The first eighteen keys are typically associated with opening gates to the realms of elements and sub-elements. In Enochian magic, these realms are often mapped onto the Great Tablet, a complex symbolic diagram used in Enochian ritual work.

The nineteenth key is specifically used to open gateways to the Thirty Aethyrs. The Aethyrs are envisioned as concentric rings that expand outward from the innermost Aethyr to the outermost. They are often viewed as a map of the entire universe, with each Aethyr providing access to unique spiritual insights and experiences. Exploring these Aethyrs is seen as a journey through different levels of spiritual consciousness and understanding.

=== The Temple ===
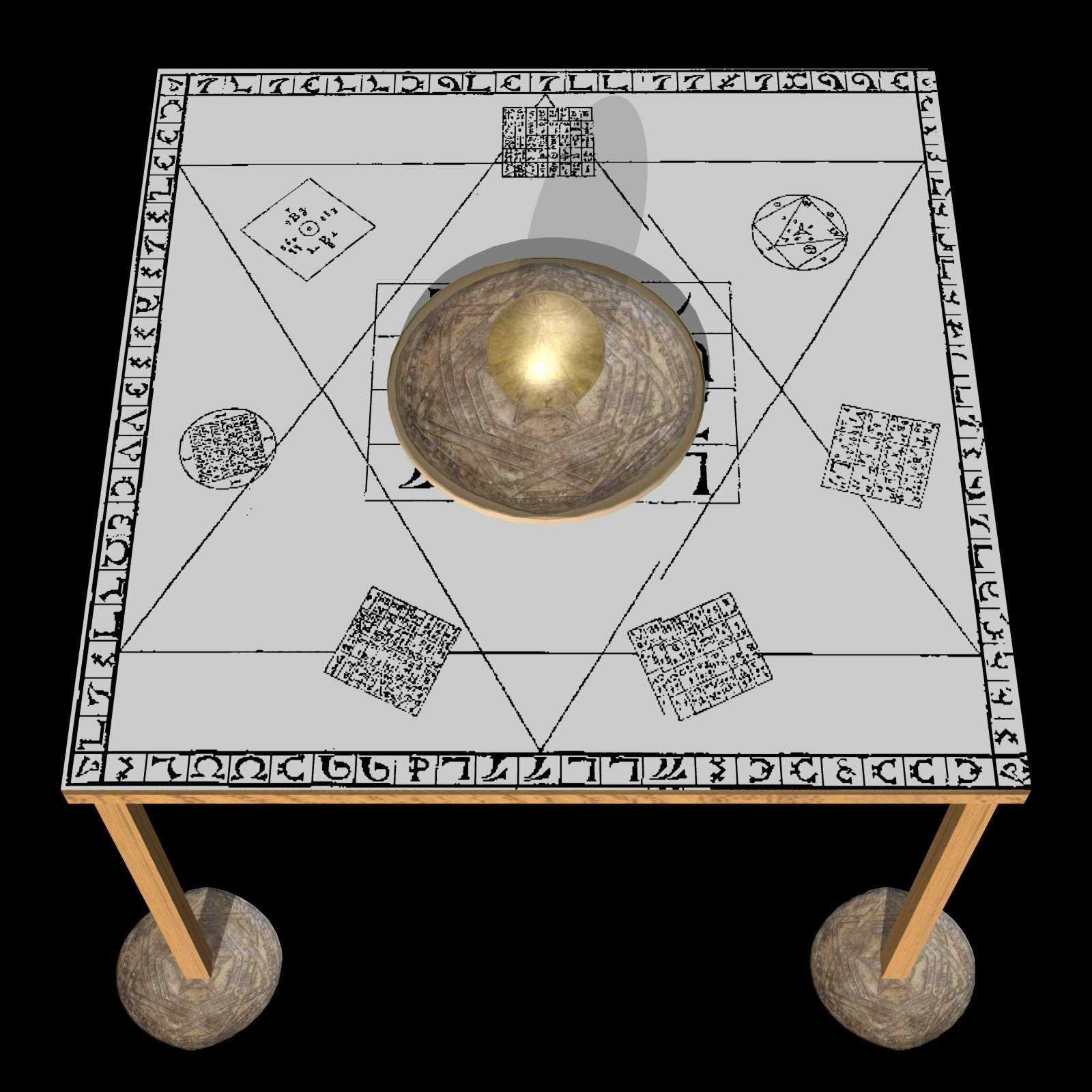
3D reconstruction of the "Holy Table" used by John Dee, including a crystal ball used for scrying, seven planetary talismans, and circular tablets inscribed with the Seal of God

Temple "furniture" required for the performance of Enochian magic includes:

1. The Holy Table: a table with a top engraved with a Hexagram, a surrounding border of Enochian letters, and in the middle a Twelvefold table (cell) engraved with individual Enochian letters. According to Duquette and Hyatt, the Holy Table "does not directly concern Elemental or Aethyrical workings. Angels found on the Holy Table are not called forth in these operations."
2. The Seven Planetary Talismans: The names on these talismans (which are engraved on tin and placed on the surface of the Holy Table) are those of the Goetia. According to Duquette and Hyatt, "this indicates (or at least implies) Dee's familiarity with the Lemegeton and his attempt, at least early in his workings, to incorporate it in the Enochian system." As with the Holy Table, Spirits found on these talismans are not called forth in these operations.
3. The Sigillum dei Aemeth, (Note: "Aemeth" or "Emeth" is Hebrew for "truth"; the same word was written on the forehead of a Golem in Jewish folklore by magicians who legendarily animated these beings. For detailed information on the history and use of the Sigillum dei Aemeth, consult Campbell 2009.) Holy Sevenfold Table, or 'Seal of God's Truth': The symbol derives from the grimoire called Liber Juratus or The Sworn Book of Honorius, of which Dee owned a copy. Five versions of this complex diagram are made from beeswax and engraved with various linear figures, letters, and numbers. The four smaller ones are placed under the feet of the Holy Table. The fifth and larger one (about nine inches in diameter) is covered with a red cloth, placed on the Holy Table, and is used to support the "Shew-Stone" or "Speculum" (crystal or other device used for scrying). Scrying is an essential element of the magical system. Dee and Kelly's technique was to gaze into a concave obsidian mirror. Crowley habitually held a large topaz mounted upon a wooden cross to his forehead. Other methods include gazing into crystals, ink, fire or even a blank TV screen.
4. A magician's ring engraved with the magical formula PVELLE.
5. The magic rod "el", painted in three sections, the ends being black and the middle red.

== Adaptation by the Hermetic Order of the Golden Dawn ==
Little else became of Dee's work until late in the nineteenth century, when it was incorporated by a brotherhood of adepts in England.

The rediscovery of Dee and Kelley's material by Samuel Liddell MacGregor Mathers of the Hermetic Order of the Golden Dawn in the 1880s led to Mathers developing the material into a comprehensive system of ceremonial magic. Magicians invoked the Enochian deities whose names were written on the tablets. They also traveled in their bodies of light into these subtle regions and recorded their psychic experiences. The two major branches of the system were then grafted onto the Adeptus Minor curriculum of the Golden Dawn. According to Aleister Crowley, the magician starts with the 30th aethyr and works up to the first, exploring only so far as his level of initiation will permit.

According to Chris Zalewski's 1994 book, the Golden Dawn also invented the game of Enochian chess, in which aspects of the Enochian Tablets were used for divination. They used four chessboards without symbols on them, just sets of colored squares, and each board is associated with one of the four elements of magic.

Florence Farr founded the Sphere Group, which also experimented with Enochian magic.

=== Criticism of the Golden Dawn adaptation ===
Paul Foster Case (1884–1954), an occultist who began his magical career with the Alpha et Omega, was critical of the Enochian system. According to Case, the system of Dee and Kelley was partial from the start, an incomplete system derived from an earlier and complete Qabalistic system, and lacked sufficient protection methods. Case believed he had witnessed the physical breakdown of a number of practitioners of Enochian magic, due to the lack of protective methods. When Case founded his own magical order, the Builders of the Adytum (B.O.T.A.), he removed the Enochian system and substituted elemental tablets based on Qabalistic formulae communicated to him by Master R.

== In popular culture ==
Since horror writer H. P. Lovecraft, in his short work "The History of the Necronomicon" (written 1927, published after Lovecraft's death, in 1938), made John Dee the translator of one of the versions of his mythical book of forbidden lore, The Necronomicon (an example of Lovecraft's use of the technique of "pseudo-authenticity"), much has been written connecting Dee and Enochian magic with The Necronomicon. The fanciful connection between Dee and The Necronomicon was suggested by Lovecraft's friend Frank Belknap Long.

== See also ==
- Magical formula
- Monas Hieroglyphica
