= Ann Davies (occultist) =

American occultist

Ann Davies (October 28, 1912 – June 9 1975) was an American occultist.

== Early life ==
An aspiring dancer left crippled by a tragic illness, Ann Davies was born in Cleveland, Ohio. Davies explored atheism and agnosticism before discovering Hindu philosophy and practicing Buddhism.

In 1944 she met Paul Foster Case, who inspired a lifelong devotion to Hermetic Qabalah and B.O.T.A. Tarot. Davies trained extensively with Case for a decade, until his death in 1954.

== B.O.T.A. ==
Successor to Paul Foster Case in Builders of the Adytum (B.O.T.A.), Davies served as Prolocutor General until her death in 1975. She expanded the curriculum of the school by amplifying and reworking Case's 'Esoteric Astrology' and by authoring the courses on 'Developing Supersensory Powers,' 'Sexual Polarity,' 'Meditational Ascent of the Tree of Livingness,' and 'Qabalistic Doctrines of Rebirth.'

According to her B.O.T.A. obituary, Ann was born on October 28, 1912, in Cleveland, Ohio.

== Published works ==
- This is Truth About the Self. Short meditations covering the essence of each statement of The Pattern on the Trestleboard (something akin to a creed for the Builders of the Adytum). Touches on the Ten Divine Emanations depicted on the Qabalistic Tree of Life.
- Inspirational Thoughts on the Tarot. Davies' original poetry, discussion of the attribution of the Tarot Keys and material from Davies' Tarot classes are blended together in essays examining each of the Major Tarot Keys.
- Monograph on Principles of Health and Diet. Advice and guidance about physical health from a Qabalistic perspective.
- Many of Davies' lectures and monographs on Qabalah, occult tarot, meditation and astrology are described at the B.O.T.A. website.

== Biography ==
Some biographical material on Davies can be found in the book Paul Foster Case. His Life and Works by Paul Clark, Steward of the Fraternity of the Hidden Light. The book also contains purported messages from Master R (Comte de St. Germaine) to Paul Foster Case, Ann Davies and Case's wife Harriet.
