= B.O.T.A. tarot deck =

Tarot deck created by Paul Foster Case

The BOTA Tarot (also spelled BOTA, B.o.t.A., or BotA) was created by Paul Foster Case, founder of Builders of the Adytum (BOTA), and artist Jessie Burns Parke. Although it is based upon, and closely resembles, Arthur Edward Waite's 1909 Rider-Waite deck, Case changed what he said were mistakes or "blinds" on the part of Waite. The BOTA Tarot is available as a standard-sized deck and a larger version containing only the Major Arcana (trump cards; often called "tarot keys" by Case) in black and white, as Case believed that every student must color in their own deck. After his death, the Major Arcana became also available in color. Each of these cards has a border of a particular color associated with that according to Case. The Minor Arcana cards are illustrated with suit symbols only.

Each trump card features a Hebrew letter in the lower right corner, corresponding to the associations outlined in Case’s writings. Unlike some earlier occult tarot decks, which place the Fool card last in order, and associate it with the second-to-last Hebrew letter, shin (such decks order the last Hebrew letter, tav, before shin), the BOTA deck places the Fool card first in order, and therefore associates it with the first Hebrew letter, aleph. It also orders shin before tav, in the correct order of Hebrew letters. Notice however that in Waite's original order, the Fool card comes second-to-last, hence recreating the original order of the Hebrew alphabet.

== Differences from the Rider-Waite deck ==
The BOTA tarot deck is very similar to the Rider–Waite Tarot and is sometimes considered a clone. However, all of the card illustrations differ in at least some minor way from those of the Rider-Waite deck.

The card that contrasts the most between the two decks is the Death card. In the Rider-Waite deck, the Death card depicts the personified figure of Death as an armored knight on a horse, carrying a banner; whereas in the BOTA deck, this figure is depicted as a bare skeleton with a scythe, with a red sky in the background, being based upon the Death card of the Marseille tarot deck.

In the Rider-Waite deck, the Sun card depicts a nude child on a horse, carrying a dull-red banner, whereas in the BOTA deck, the card depicts two nude children standing in a field, being again based upon the Sun card of the Marseille deck.

Various more subtle elements of symbolism also differ between various cards in the two decks.

== The "tarot tableau" spread ==
In his book The Tarot: A Key to the Wisdom of the Ages, Paul Foster Case published the Hebrew letter attributions of the Golden Dawn for the first time. Also made public was Case's "tarot tableau", a spread (pattern for laying out all of the tarot cards) which Case said revealed certain relationships and dissimilarities among them. This tableau was used by the American branch of Alpha et Omega when Case was the "praemonstrator" (chief instructor) of that order's Thoth–Hermes lodge in Chicago. The tarot tableau is an arrangement of the 22 major arcana cards into three horizontal rows that span across seven vertical columns. Above the top row there is only the Fool card, above the center of the row. The three rows consist of seven cards each, arranged in sequential order, such that cards 1 through 7 are in the top row, cards 8 through 14 are in the centre row, and cards 15 through 21 are in the bottom row.

== Use in meditation and intuition ==
Builders of the Adytum, although an organization devoted to mysticism (specifically Western esotericism), has repeatedly emphasized that tarot cards are primarily a tool for meditation, not fortune-telling. After explaining the BOTA method for tarot divination in his book titled The Tarot: A Key to the Wisdom of the Ages, Case specifically explained the differences between this particular type of divination and fortune-telling. Case then closed with the warning: "Finally, let me reiterate the thought that this is not to be used for vulgar fortune telling, or to amuse a party of friends. If you yield to the temptation so to abuse this information, you will pay for it in the loss of all power of true divination, and probably in the loss of ability to control the higher rates of psychic vibration."

== Correspondences to the Qabalistic Cube of Space and Tree of Life ==
The Tarot: A Key to the Wisdom of the Ages was the first published book to apply almost all of the tarot attributions to the "Cube of Space" diagram. There are 22 Major Arcana tarot cards, which Case corresponded to 22 components of the Cube of Space.

The Sepher Yetzirah is the source of the link between the Cube of Space and the Hebrew letters. The Sepher Yetzirah' itself does not directly mention a "cube of space", nor any kind of cube. Case based the Cube of Space upon two verses in the Sepher Yetzirah: the first, in chapter 4, associates six Hebrew letters with six cardinal directions (up, down, east, west, north, south); the second, in chapter 5, associates 12 Hebrew letters with 12 diagonal directional arms or boundaries (different translations use different terms), which Case interpreted as the 12 edges of a cube.

Case associated his Cube of Space with the Tree of Life of Kabbalah (Qabalah). He based that association upon paragraph 95 of the Sepher Ha-Bahir. That paragraph does mention a tree, though does not specifically name it the Tree of Life; it states that a tree is inside the twelve diagonals that are mentioned in the Sepher Yetzirah. Because the Tree of Life consists of 10 sephiroth, Case associated the three "mother" letters (aleph, mem, shin) and seven "double" letters of the Sepher Yetzirah with ten corresponding sephiroth.

Until the publication of Case's The Tarot, most English-speaking occultists had never heard of Case's Cube of Space concept, nor any alleged correspondences between tarot and the Tree of Life diagram, though the latter correspondence have become common in modern times (e.g., many tarot decks feature a Tree of Life diagram on the jacket of the Fool). Until the mid-1990s, there were almost no other books in print which even mentioned the Cube of Space. The ones that do (sometimes in different terms such as "the Qabalistic Cube") defer to Case's writings on the subject.

== Bibliography ==
Writings of Case and others regarding the BOTA Tarot deck:

- Case, Paul Foster; The Book of Tokens: Tarot Meditations
- Case, Paul Foster; The Tarot, A Key to the Wisdom of the Ages
- Case, Paul Foster; Highlights of Tarot
- Davies, Ann; Inspirational Thoughts on the Tarot
- Hulse, David Allen; New Dimensions for the Cube of Space: The Path of Initiation Revealed by the Tarot upon the Qabalistic Cube
- Jayanti, Amber; Living the Tarot
- Lotterhand, Jason C. The Thursday Night Tarot
- Townley, Kevin; The Cube of Space: Container of Creation
- Townley, Kevin; Meditations on the Cube of Space
