= William G. Gray =

English occult writer (1913–1992)

- Gray at the Rollright Stones (photograph by Geoff Dearn)
- Born: William Gordon Gray; 25 March 1913; Harrow, Middlesex, England
- Died: 1992 (aged 78–79)
- Occupations: Ceremonial magician, writer
- Parent(s): Christine Ash Gray and John McCammon Trew Gray

William G. Gray (25 March 1913 – 1992) was an English ceremonial magician, Hermetic Qabalist and writer, who published widely on the subject of western esotericism and the occult. Gray founded a magical order known as the Sangreal Sodality. The historian Ronald Hutton described him as "one of Britain's most famous ritual magicians".

Born to a working-class family in Harrow, Middlesex, Gray moved around in his childhood, living in various locations across England, and also in Montreal, Quebec, Canada, where he took a particular interest in the rituals of the Roman Catholic Church. Developing an early interest in western esotericism from his mother, who was a professional fortune teller, he met a number of famous occultists in his youth, including Victor Neuburg, Aleister Crowley and Dion Fortune. Eventually taking an Austrian named Emile Napoleon Hauenstein to be his magical teacher, he joined the British Army and served for several years, fighting in the Second World War.

Returning to Britain, he befriended and performed rituals with members of many different occult currents in Britain at the time, including Robert Cochrane, and published a number of books on the subject of the esoteric. 1975 saw the publication of The Rollright Ritual, a book about the rituals and alleged spiritual interactions which he had experienced at the Rollright Stones, a Neolithic stone circle in the Cotswolds.

The life and work of Gray is referenced in the works of various occultists and academics studying western esotericism, while in 2003 the writers Alan Richardson and Marcus Claridge published a biography of him, entitled The Old Sod. Gareth Knight, who was acquainted with Gray, referred to him as a "redoubtable old occultist".

== Childhood: 1913–1925 ==
Gray was born on 25 March 1913 in Harrow, Middlesex. His mother, Christine Ash Gray (née Christine Chester Logie) was an American with a Roman Catholic background. But she took a great practical interest in Western esotericism and associated with other occultists, believing herself to be the reincarnation of Marie-Noémi Cadiot (1832–1888), the wife of the influential French occultist Eliphas Lévi (1810–1875). William's father on the other hand, John McCammon Trew Gray, was from a "Low Church" background and took little interest in the esoteric. The couple had married on 26 August 1910 in Philadelphia, where John had been managing a theatrical touring company and Christine had been working as an actress; both of them had been previously married, with John being a 44-year-old divorcee and Christine a 27-year-old widow at the time.

When the First World War broke out in 1914, the United Kingdom allied itself with France to fight Germany, leading John Gray to lie about his age to enlist in the British Army, believing it to be his patriotic duty; joining the Ox and Bucks Light Infantry, he served in France and then India, where he took charge of a prisoner of war camp at Elephanta Island near Bombay. With her husband away at war, Christine Gray took up employment with the British War Office, eventually being posted to the London American Headquarters. She sent her young son William to live with his elderly grandmother and Aunt Lella in Ramsgate, where (he would later relate) he was "badly behaved, disobedient, [and] untidy". Eventually, Aunt Lella fell ill and William was sent to live with his Aunt Will and Aunt Florence, a couple who were active in the Theosophical Society. It was there that William first learned about the esoteric, although he would always associate Theosophy somewhat derogatorily with "elderly ladies of both sexes and genteel behaviour whose ideas of Nirvana centred around mysterious Oriental Masters who directed the destiny of all mankind from a secret spot in Tibet."

When he was eight, he began his education at primary school, which he despised, and soon after was sent back to live with his parents, who had settled into Forest Hill, London after the war. His mother took him to Mass at a local Roman Catholic Church, which he enjoyed very much. He developed a lifelong appreciation of ritual and decided he would one day like to be ordained as a Catholic priest. In 1922, he and his mother moved to Montreal in Canada, where she was hospitalised for a serious chest infection. He was put under the care of his Aunt Leslie and her husband Bruce, a wealthy stockbroker. In Montreal, he continued to attend Mass, but lost his desire to become a priest because the rituals at the Canadian church were less impressive than those in England.

== Involvement in the occult: 1926–1935 ==
"All I remember Crowley saying to me was something like: 'So this is your Great Magician is it? He doesn’t look very dangerous to me. Wouldn't you like to be as wicked as I am?' Not quite knowing what to make of this I muttered something about my uncertainty and my mother turned it to a joke by saying 'Oh he can be wicked enough when he wants to be.' Whereupon Crowley stared at me very solemnly and almost intoned his famous phrase: DO WHAT THOU WILT SHALL BE THE WHOLE OF THE LAW, making this his exit line. I never met him again, nor did I ever discover what he and mother said to each other."

— William G. Gray

Returning to Britain after his mother's recovery, William and his parents moved into a flat in East Park Terrace in Southampton. Due to problems in the couple's relationship, Christine and John slept in different bedrooms and William shared with his father, with whom he had a strained relationship. Because the family struggled with financial problems, Christine worked as a professional fortune teller and William shared his mother's interest in western esotericism, reading books on metaphysics and psychology from the local library. Later relating that he experienced several visions at this time, he devised several magical rituals using the kitchen as a temple, based upon what he had read in books and his own innovation.

He attended lectures given by the Theosophical Society and also met a number of famous occultists who were friends of his mother; these included Arthur Wilson, who later tried to found a commune in Canada, and Victor Neuburg (1883–1940), whom Gray would always remember as "one of the gentlest men I ever met". "Once or twice" he briefly met the infamous ceremonial magician Aleister Crowley (1875–1947), founder of the religion of Thelema and a pariah figure in the British press. An old friend and magical partner of Neuburg's, Crowley made Christine feel uneasy; she later told her son that Crowley was "not a very nice man" and burned the signed copy of his book 777 that he gave her.

By the age of 14, Gray was intent on finding a magical teacher from whom he could learn more about Western esotericism and the practice of ceremonial magic. On a visit to an uncle in London, Gray travelled to the home of Dion Fortune (1890–1946), the noted ceremonial magician and leader of the Fraternity of the Inner Light. She spoke to him briefly, but informed him that no one under the age of 21 would be admitted to the Fraternity, and simply wished him well before sending him away empty handed. An eager reader of the Occult Review, Gray also wrote a letter to the paper discussing his views on Rosicrucianism, which was subsequently published, leading another occultist to get in touch with him. This man was Emile Napoleon Hauenstein (1877–?), an Austrian esotericist who ran a newspaper shop in Piccadilly where he lived with his daughter. Hauenstein, whom Gray usually referred to as "ENH", had formerly been a Martinist and an associate of the French occultist Gérard Encausse, the founder of the Qabalistic Order of the Rosy Cross. The two struck up a correspondence and then a friendship, with Hauenstein becoming Gray's magical mentor, teaching him various exercises designed to develop his concentration and ability to perform ceremonial magic rituals.

== Armed Forces from 1936 ==
Gray had gone through a series of temporary jobs since leaving school, and eventually decided to join the British armed forces. After receiving the blessing of Hauenstein, who informed him that he could continue his magical training while in the army, he duly did so, being admitted into the Royal Corps of Signals, and fought in the Second World War.

Gray underwent a series of nocturnal meditations at the Rollright Stones, a prehistoric site in the Cotswolds, in which he hoped to commune with spiritual energies that he believed existed there. He published his subsequent ideas as The Rollright Ritual in 1975. In this book, he described a ritual that occultists could perform at the site which drew heavily upon the practices carried out by Cochrane.

Gray worked with Robert Cochrane. Cochrane's letters to Gray survive and are a key source for understanding his beliefs. In 1982, Gray met with the California-based Wiccans Dave and Ann Finnin, who were then visiting England to learn more about Cochrane. He gave them a ritual cord in his possession that had once belonged to Cochrane and put them in contact with Cochrane's fellow Clan member, Evan John Jones.

== Sangreal Sodality ==
"Real esotericism was not just dressing up in handsome robes and manipulating symbols for the sake of so doing. It was knowing how to apply the meaning of such symbols to Life itself, for the purpose of altering or directing its energy in accordance with intention. For example, a Magical Sword was not the physical symbol one handles in Temple practice, but its qualities as applied to the human being. Flexibility, sharpness, keenness, brightness, pointedness of action, and everything else to be thought of in connection with a well-balanced blade."

— William G. Gray

The Sangreal Sodality is a spiritual brotherhood of the Western Inner Tradition founded by William G. Gray and Jacobus G. Swart, and was officially launched by them on 19 November 1980 on the occasion of the official inauguration of the first Sangreal Sodality Temple named "Domine Dirige Nos" in Johannesburg, South Africa, and the induction of the first initiated member of this brotherhood. Chapters and Temples of the Sangreal Sodality have been established in South Africa, Latin America, North America, Britain and Europe.

The designation “Sangreal Sodality” speaks of spiritual principles and ideals which prompted its foundation. The term "Sangreal" is understood in this brotherhood to be "Sang" ("blood") and "Real" ("authentic)". the basic premise being the "True Identity" and "Inner Values" within each single human individual.

Members of the Sangreal Sodality gather in Temples, Lodges or Chapters. These are operated independently of one another. Individuals who agree with, or feel inspired by, the teachings and practices expounded in the basic textbooks of the Sangreal Sodality, may set up a Temple, Lodge or Chapter. Such a working circle is deemed an autonomous grouping, which may link with other such groups, or remain independent in accordance with preference. As such, each group is responsible for its personal self-government, financing, and organisation.

Sangreal Sodality is not a religion, nor does it oppose any valid religion of any denomination. The Sangreal Sodality allows a focus for willing individuals to articulate their approach to divinity — without external dictates or interference of hierarchical structures.

== Personal life and death ==
In their biography of Gray, Richardson and Claridge noted that he held to "many of the prejudices of his class, age and locale". He was openly racialist, and Richardson and Claridge claimed that he was also racist, because he used the word "Nigerian" as a euphemism for the derogatory term "nigger". Despite these views, they related that he was neither sexist nor homophobic, getting along well with women and taking no issue with several homosexual occultists that he knew.

Gray died in 1992 at the age of 79.

== Works ==
- The Ladder of Lights, or Qabalah Renovata. Helios. 1968. ISBN 9780877285366.
- Magical Ritual Methods. Helios. 1969. ISBN 9780900448010.
- Inner Traditions of Magic. Helios. 1970. ISBN 9780877281535.
- The Office of the Holy Tree of Life. The Sangreal Foundation. 1970. OCLC 1703807.
- Seasonal occult rituals. London: Aquarian Press. 1970. ISBN 9780850300567.
- (with Bruce C. Griffin) Magical Images: Ten Beautiful Lithographs of the Magical Images Together With a Booklet On their Purpose and Use. The Sangreal Foundation. 1972.
- The Simplified Guide to the Holy Tree of Life. Labrys. 1973.
- The Rollright Ritual. Helios. 1975. ISBN 9780900448218.
- The Rite of Light: A Mass of the Western Inner Mystery Tradition. 1976. OCLC 40069029.
- A Self Made by Magic. Weiser. 1976. ISBN 9780877283331.
- The Talking Tree. Weiser. 1977. ISBN 9780877281900.
- An Outlook on Our Inner Western Way. Weiser. 1980. ISBN 9780877284932.
- Western Inner Workings. Sangreal Sodality Series. Vol. I. Weiser. 1983. ISBN 9780877285601.
- The Sangreal Sacrament. Sangreal Sodality Series. Vol. II. Weiser. 1983. ISBN 9780877285625.
- Concepts of Qabalah. Sangreal Sodality Series. Vol. III. Weiser. 1984. ISBN 9780877285618.
- Sangreal Rituals and Ceremonies. Sangreal Sodality Series. Vol. IV. Weiser. 1986. OCLC 1330617406.
- The Novena of the Tree of Life. The Sangreal Sodality Press. 1987. ISBN 9780620107990.
- The Sangreal Tarot: A Magical Ritual System of Personal Evolution. Weiser. 1988. ISBN 9780877286653.
- Temple Magic: Building the Personal Temple Gateway to Inner Worlds. Llewellyn. 1988. ISBN 9780875422749.
- Between Good and Evil: Polarities of Power. Llewellyn. 1989. ISBN 9780875422732.
- Attainment Through Magic: Evoking the Higher Self. Llewellyn. 1990. ISBN 9780875422985.
- Evoking the Primal Goddess: Discovery of the Eternal Feminine Within. Llewellyn. 1989. ISBN 9780875422718.
- By Standing Stone and Elder Tree: Ritual and the Unconscious. Llewellyn. 1990. ISBN 9780875422992.
- Growing the Tree Within: Patterns of the Unconscious Revealed by the Qabbalah. Llewellyn. 1991. ISBN 9780875422688.
- Qabalistic Concepts: Living the Tree. Weiser. 1997. ISBN 9781578630004.
- Exorcising The Tree of Evil: How To Use The Symbolism Of The Qabalistic Tree of Life To Recognise And Reverse Negative Energy. Kima Global House. 2004. ISBN 9780958449311.
- A Beginners Guide to Living Kabbalah. Sangreal Sodality Press. 2009. ISBN 9780620428873.
- Language of the Gods. Sangreal Sodality Press. 2009.
- Lessons Learned from Occult Letters. Sangreal Sodality Press. 2018. ISBN 9780620790246.
