= Society of Guardians =

Western esoteric order

- Abbreviation: The Guardians
- Type: Western esoteric order
- Purpose: Meditation, ceremonial ritual, and esoteric study combining Christian mysticism and Jewish Kabbalistic teachings
- Headquarters: Melbourne, Australia (original sanctuary)
- Location: "Sanctuary of the Angels," Horoeka Avenue, Mount Eden, Auckland, New Zealand
- Members: Limited to 22 per sanctuary
- Senior Guardian: Michael Freedman (born Michel Tyne-Corbold)

The Society of Guardians or The Guardians, is a Western esoteric order that integrates mystical Christian and Jewish Kabbalistic teachings. The Society combines an emphasis on meditation and contemplative practice, ceremonial ritual, and esoteric study with a nature-centered approach to spiritual development. Traditionally, each sanctuary is limited to 22 members who are described as "technical mystics".

== History ==
Michel Tyne-Corbold joined the Melbourne Sanctuary of the Society in 1959, and became Senior Guardian in 1967 at which time he assumed the public pen name Michael Freedman. He has previously been an ordained Anglican priest but had left that vocation. In January 1968, Freedman and three other Australians went to India to study at the Maharishi Academy in India. Freedman graduated from the Maharishi Mahesh Yogi's Academy (Rishikesh headquarters) in India and, upon returning to Australia, established himself as a Transcendental Meditation teacher.

In 1970, Freedman moved to Auckland, New Zealand with his wife. He studied for an undergraduate degree in Psychology at the University of Auckland during the mid to late 1970s.

In 1978, the Society began offering a free meditation course. Following this, it opened the "Sanctuary of the Angels" in a house on Horoeka Avenue, on the slopes of Mount Eden and built a flourishing order. The order's rites are Mithraic in nature and are based on solar and lunar cycles. A "Mass of the Archangels" is held weekly, and seasonal festivals are observed.

== See also ==
- Magical organization
