= Builders of the Adytum =

Western mystery tradition

Builders of the Adytum logo

The Builders of the Adytum (BOTA, also spelled B.O.T.A., BotA, or B.o.t.A.) is a school of the Western mystery tradition based in Los Angeles which is registered as a non-profit tax-exempt religious organization. It was founded by Paul Foster Case and has its roots in both the Hermetic Order of the Golden Dawn and the Masonic blue lodge system. It was later extended by Ann Davies.

The B.O.T.A. teaches by correspondence, covering esoteric psychology, tarot, Hermetic Qabalah, astrology, and meditation techniques. It also holds a variety of ritual services and study groups, some open to the public.

Worldwide membership is around 5,000.

== Origins of the name ==
Adytum is Greek for "Inner Shrine" or "Holy of Holies" and "Builders" refers to the emulation of the Carpenter from Nazareth, Jesus, whom some members of the B.O.T.A. believe was adept in the mysteries of building a living temple without hands (Mark 14:58).

== History ==
The Order was founded 1922 by Paul Foster Case. Case was a senior member of the Hermes-Thoth Alpha et Omega Temple in the United States. After a disagreement with Moina Mathers, principal head and widow of MacGregor Mathers, he left the Golden Dawn along with some former members and formed a separate order.

With the death of Paul Foster Case his secretary Ann Davies became the head of B.O.T.A.. The order flourished and expanded to Europe and Australia.

== Beliefs ==
B.O.T.A. believes that the Qabalah is the mystical root of both ancient Judaism and the original Christianity. People of all faiths are accepted if they are mystically inclined.

For members of the B.O.T.A., the means whereby higher consciousness and divine illumination may be gained include both theory and practice. These teachings and practical secrets constitute what the Builders of the Adytum refer to as Ageless Wisdom. It is called "Ageless" because they believe it is not susceptible to the mutations of time. Ageless Wisdom is not viewed by the B.O.T.A. as primarily a product of man's thinking. It is "written by God upon the face of nature" and is always there for men and women of all epochs to read, if they can.

== Regional organizations ==
B.O.T.A. has Open Forum and Pronaos healing ritual work in many cities throughout the world:

1. Northeast US
2. Midwest / Southeast US
3. Southwest US / Rocky Mt.
4. Northwest US
5. Southern California / Arizona / Nevada
6. South America & Mexico
7. Australia and New Zealand
8. Europe

=== Open Forum ===
These groups are open to all and afford an opportunity to interact with those who share a common spiritual teaching and practice. The purposes for the Open Forum include (1) developing fraternal Love and Harmony, (2) developing higher consciousness, (3) incorporating the principles of Ageless Wisdom in everyday life, (4) learning to enjoy together the operation of the One Will (the will of God), and (5) providing an open door to the Mysteries to all who genuinely seek them. Open Forum can be in-person or online.

=== Group ritual ===
Group Ritual Work has long been used in the Western mystery tradition as a dynamic means of bringing about spiritual and fraternal insights. Open only to B.O.T.A. members, this ritualistic work occurs after initiation into Pronaos which includes an oath of secrecy. Its aim is to impress symbolism more effectively upon the aspirants' psyches through dramatic enactment, bringing the static images of the B.O.T.A. tarot deck into motion.

== See also ==
- B.O.T.A. tarot deck
- Magical organization

== Sources ==
- Hulse, David Allen. The Western Mysteries. Llewellyn Publications; 2nd edition, 2002. ISBN 978-1-56718-429-7
