= Paul Foster Case =

American occultist (1884–1954)

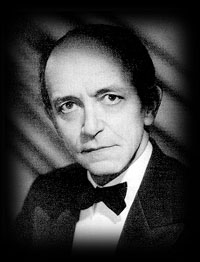
Paul Foster Case

Paul Foster Case (October 3, 1884 – March 1, 1954) was an American occultist, Freemason, and writer of books on occult tarot and Qabalah. Perhaps his greatest contributions to the field of occultism were the lessons he wrote for associate members of Builders of the Adytum or B.O.T.A. The knowledge lectures given to initiated members of the chapters of the B.O.T.A. were equally profound, although the limited distribution has made them less well known.

== Early life ==
A modern scholar of the occult tarot and Qabalah, Paul Foster Case was born on October 3, 1884, in Fairport, New York.

His father was the town librarian and a deacon at the local Congregational church. When he was five years old, his mother began teaching him to play the piano and organ, and later in his youth, Case performed as organist in his family's church. A talented musician, he embarked on a successful career as a violinist, and orchestra conductor. He had an honorary doctorate in music awarded to him. Case was early on attracted to the occult. While still a child he reported experiences that today are called lucid dreaming. He corresponded about these experiences with Rudyard Kipling who encouraged him as to the validity of his paranormal pursuits.

In the year 1901, Case met the occultist Claude Bragdon while both were performing at a charity performance. Bragdon asked Case what he thought the origin of playing cards was. After pursuing the question in his father's library, Case discovered a link to tarot, called 'The Game of Man'. Thus began what would become Case's lifelong study of the tarot, and leading to the creation of the B.O.T.A. tarot deck, which Case called a "corrected" version of the Rider–Waite cards.

Between 1905 and 1908 (aged 20–24), Case began practicing yoga, and in particular pranayama, from what published sources were available. His early experiences appear to have caused him some mental and emotional difficulties and left him with a lifelong concern that so called "occult" practice be done with proper guidance and training.

In the summer of 1907, Case read The Secret of Mental Magic by William W. Atkinson (aka Ramacharaka) which led him to correspond with the then popular new thought author. Biographer Paul Clark has proposed that Case and Atkinson were two of the three anonymous authors of The Kybalion, although the introduction to The Kybalion: The Definitive Edition (2011) presents considerable evidence for Atkinson as the book's sole author.

== Dilemma: music or the mysteries ==
Case reported a meeting on the streets of Chicago, in 1909 or 1910, that was to change the course of his life. "Dr. Fludd", a Chicago physician, approached the young Case and greeting him by name, saying he had a message from a "master of wisdom who is my teacher as well as yours."

The stranger said that Case was being offered a choice. He could continue with his successful musical career and live comfortably, or he could dedicate himself to "serve humanity" and thereby play a role in the coming age. From that time on, Case began to study and formulate the lessons that served as the core curricula of the "Builders of the Adytum", the school of tarot study and Qabalah that Case founded and that continues today.

Case published a series of articles on "The Secret Doctrine of the Tarot" in the popular occult magazine The Word in 1916. The articles attracted wide notice in the occult community for organizing and clarifying what had previously been confusing and scattered occult doctrines about the meaning of the tarot cards.

== Whitty and Alpha et Omega ==
In 1918, Case met Michael James Whitty (died December 27, 1920, in Los Angeles, California), who was the editor of Azoth magazine and would become a close friend. Whitty was serving as the 'cancellarius' (treasurer/office manager) for the Thoth-Hermes Lodge in Chicago, which was one of the lodges of the Alpha et Omega (A.O.). Alpha et Omega, founded in 1906, was the successor organization to the Hermetic Order of the Golden Dawn, both founded by S. L. MacGregor Mathers, after the demise of the Golden Dawn in 1903. Whitty invited Case to join Thoth-Hermes, which was the direct American lodge under the A.O. mother lodge in Paris. Case joined, and quickly moved up initiations in the Rosicrucian grades (True and Invisible Rosicrucian Order). (Note: Horowitz (2010), pp. 211–212. mistakenly says that Case was in the Hermetic Order of the Golden Dawn, rather than the Alpha et Omega.) Case's aspiration name in A.O. was Perseverantia (which means 'perseverance').

Whitty republished Case's attribution of the Tarot keys (with corrections) in Azoth magazine. That same year, Case became the 'sub-praemonstrator' (assistant chief instructor) at the Thoth-Hermes Lodge. Also during that year he finished a set of articles on the Mystical Rosicrucian Origins of Faust and published by Whitty. The following year, he began to correspond with Dr. John William Brodie-Innes (Fr. Sub Spe).

Between 1919 and 1920, Case and Michael Whitty collaborated in the development of the text which would later be published as The Book of Tokens. This book was written as a received text, whether through meditation, automatic writing, or some other means. It later surfaced that Master R. was the source. On May 16, 1920, Case was initiated into Alpha et Omega's Second Order. Three weeks later, according to the Hermetic Order of the Golden Dawn's bio-page on Case, he was named Third Adept.

In December 1920, Michael Whitty died. Case believed Whitty's health problems were attributable to the dangers that arise or may arise in the practice of Enochian magic. He later corresponded with Israel Regardie about those concerns.

== Controversy with Moina Mathers ==
Like his fellow British occultist and later correspondent, Dion Fortune, Case found himself in a controversy with Moina Mathers (1865-1928) in the early 1920s. Perhaps because of his quick advancement through the grades of the order, Case sparked some jealousy among the other adepts. Moreover, others may have thought some of his teachings inappropriate. On July 18, 1921, Mathers wrote Case regarding complaints she had received regarding some of his teachings. Apparently, Case had begun discussing the topics of sexual symbolism and sex magic, which at the time had no official place in the order's curriculum. Since no knowledge lectures exist on the subject, whether sex practices were ever taught in the Golden Dawn has been a long-standing question. In her correspondence with Case, Moina wrote, "I have seen the results of this superficial sex teaching in several occult societies as well as in individual cases. I have never met with one happy result".

But to Case, sexuality became an increasingly important subject. In his Book of Tokens, a collection of inspired meditations on the 22 Tarot Keys of the Major Arcana, Case comments on the sex function, "You must wholly alter your conception of sex in order to comprehend the Ancient Wisdom. It is the interior nervous organism, not the external organs, that is always meant in phallic symbolism, and the force that works through these interior centers is the Great Magical Agent, the divine serpent fire." In his works, The True and Invisible Rosicrucian Order and The Masonic Letter G, he writes of certain practices involving the redirection of the sexual force to the higher centers of the brain where experience of supersensory states of consciousness becomes possible.

Some members also complained about a personal relationship between Case and a soror, Lilli Geise. Case confessed the matter to Moina: "The Hierophantria and I were observed to exchange significant glances over the altar during the Mystic Repast... My conscience acquits me... Our relation to each other we submit to no other Judge than that Lord of Love and Justice whom we all adore." In time, Case married Geise, who died a few years later.

Perhaps Moina's correspondence also touched a sensitive area for Case. In her July 18 letter, she tells Case, "You evidently have reached a point in your mystical Way where there would appear to exist certain cross-roads. The artist in you, which I recognize, and with whom I deeply sympathize, would probably choose to learn the Truth through the joy and beauty of physical life." She continued, "You who have studied the Pantheons, do you know of that enchanting God, the Celtic Angus, the Ever Young? He who is sometimes called Lord of the Land of Heart's Desire?" Angus rescued Etain, the Moon, who had been turned into a golden fly. But Etain had to choose between bodily existence in the land of mortals and everlasting life. She continued still, "The artist in us may have lingered in that land for a moment. But you and I who would be teachers and pioneers in this Purgatorial World must be prepared before all the Gods to be the servants of the greatest of them all... the Osiris, the Christ, the God of the Sacrifice of the Self." Moina then asked Case to resign from his position as Praemonstrator.

Case resigned as Praemonstrator, responding to Moina, "I have no desire to be a 'teacher and pioneer in this Purgatorial World. Guidance seems to have removed me from the high place to which I have never really aspired. The relief is great".

Apparently Case had already begun work on establishing a mystery school of his own—the School of Ageless Wisdom, which later became Builders of the Adytum.

== Builders of the Adytum ==
After Case left Alpha et Omega, he vigorously pursued the organization of his own mystery school. In the summer of 1922, Case put his first efforts together preparing a comprehensive correspondence course. In one year it covered what the B.O.T.A. presently covers in over five years. He called the course The Ageless Wisdom. By 1923 Case formed The School of Ageless Wisdom, probably in Boston.

== Opposition to Enochian magic ==
In the "Wheel of Life" magazine, in March 1937, Case described B.O.T.A.'s relationship to the Golden Dawn, and his beliefs about the Golden Dawn's use of Enochian material.

B.O.T.A. is a direct off-shoot of the Golden Dawn, but its work has been purged of all the dangerous and dubious magic incorporated into the Golden Dawn's curriculum by the late S.L. MacGregor Mathers, who was responsible for the inclusion of the ceremonials based on the skrying of Sir Edward Kelly.

There is much in these Golden Dawn rituals and ceremonies that is of the greatest value; but from the first grade to the last it is all vitiated by these dangerous elements taken from Dee and Kelly. Furthermore, in many places, the practical working is not provided with adequate safeguards, so that, to the present writer's personal knowledge, an operator working with the Golden Dawn [Enochian] rituals runs very grave risks of breaking down his physical organism, or of obsession by evil entities".

Dr. Paul Clark, in his book on Case, mentions his own examination of the original Cipher manuscripts on which Mathers founded the first order Golden Dawn rituals. Clark found that the "Cipher manuscripts refer to a set of tablets from the 'Old Manuscripts,' but do not specify Dee or Kelly's work by name. Mather's [sic!] had been doing much research in the British Museum where the Dee manuscripts were housed. It was natural for him, perhaps mistakenly, to assume these were the ones referenced in the Cipher manuscripts. Unfortunately, this was not necessarily the case."

== Death ==
Case died while vacationing in Mexico with his wife, Harriet. He died in the American-British-Cowdray Hospital in Mexico City, on March 1st at 23:00. His ashes lie in Forest Lawn Memorial Park in Glendale, California.

== Biography ==
Dr. Paul Clark, affiliated with the Fraternity of the Hidden Light, published the 2013 biography Paul Foster Case: His Life and Works. Besides the extensive coverage of Case (about a hundred pages), the book also includes a number of appendices, including letters from Case to Israel Regardie. Appendix II purports to be communications from Master R. to Case and two of Case's associates and comprises the longest section of the book.

== Alleged influence: Master R. ==
In the summer of 1921, Case said he had received a phone call from "The Master Rococzy" (or Rakoczy, Rákóczy or Rákóczi; also known as the "Count of St. Germain" or "Master R"). Case later allegedly met Master R. in person at the old Waldorf-Astoria in NYC (Madison and Lexington Avenues at 43rd Street). The Adytum News described it this way: "One day the phone rang, and much to his surprise the same voice which had been inwardly instructing him in his researches for many years spoke to him on the phone. It was the Master R. who had come personally to New York for the purpose of preparing Paul Case to begin the next incarnation of the Qabalistic Way of Return. ... After three weeks of personal instruction with the Master R., Builders of the Adytum was formed." The story is told in more detail in Paul Clark's biography of Case.

Case also purportedly received communications from Master R. The first set of communications resulted in The Book of Tokens, a set of meditations on the Tarot. Further and far more extensive communications were purportedly received some twenty-five years later by Case, along with Ann Davies and Case's wife Harriet, and were published in 2013.

== Bibliography ==
=== Articles ===
1. Article on tarot in The Word (1916)
2. Article on tarot (revised) in Azoth Magazine (1918)

=== Books ===
1. An Introduction to the Study of the Tarot (1920)
2. A Brief Analysis of the Tarot (1927)
3. The True and Invisible Rosicrucian Order (1927)
4. Tarot Revelations (1931)
5. Hermetic Alchemy: Science and Practice (1931)
6. Correlations of Sound & Color (1931)
7. The Highlights of Tarot (1931)
8. Learning Tarot Essentials (1932)
9. Oracle of the Tarot - A Course on Tarot Divination (1933)
10. The Book of Tokens (1934)
11. The Great Seal of the United States (1935)
12. Progressive Rotascope (1936)
13. Tarot Fundamentals 4 volumes (1936)
14. Tarot Interpretations 4 volumes (1936)
15. The Open Door (1938)
16. The Tarot: A Key to the Wisdom of the Ages (1947)
17. Daniel, Master of Magicians
18. The Masonic Letter G
19. The Name of Names

==== Course books ====
1. Occult Fundamentals and Spiritual Unfoldment. Vol. 1: The Early Writings. [no location given]: Fraternity of the Hidden Light (2008)
2. Esoteric Secrets of Meditation and Magic. Vol. 2: The Early Writings. [no location given]: Fraternity of the Hidden Light. (2008)

== See also ==
- Cube of Space
- Tarot card reading
- Western mystery tradition
