= Sigillum Dei =

Seal of God, or Seal of Truth, according to John Dee

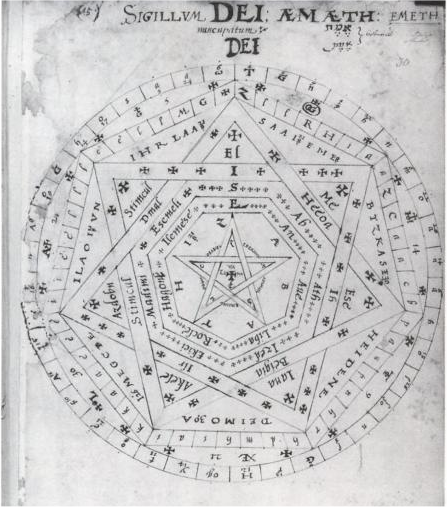
Sloane MS 3188, (1582)

The Sigillum Dei (seal of God, "Seal of Truth" or signum dei vivi, symbol of the Living God, called by John Dee the Sigillum Dei Aemeth) is a magical diagram, composed of two circles, a pentagram, two heptagons, and one heptagram, which are inscribed with the names of God and His angels. It is an angelic magic seal which, according to one of the oldest sources (Liber Juratus), empowers an intended magician to possess the Spirit of God and when activated could allow him to become The Lord God itself, communicate with spirits as well as angels and archangels, control all elements, control every creature's holy spirit including the Spirit of God itself, except for the archangels, and to control light. The intended user would also possess the true benefic vision of God.

== Middle Ages ==
=== Liber Juratus ===
Probably the oldest known description and image of the Sigillum Dei appears in the 14th-century Liber Juratus (also Liber Sacratus, Liber sacer sive Juratus, or Sworn Booke), attributed to Honorius, son of Euclid. The text may have originated in the late 13th century, but likely not before the papacy of John XXII. (1316–1334).

The Liber Juratus begins its description of the seal with instructions for constructing the outermost circle, using symbolic dimensions derived from Christian tradition:

Make first a circle whose diameter is three fingers, because of the three cross-nails of the Lord, or five fingers because of the five wounds of Christ, or seven for the seven sacraments, or nine for the nine orders of angels, but usually five fingers will suffice. Then make a second within this circle, let it be a distance from the first two grains because of the two Tablets of the Law of Moses, or three grains because of the persons of the Trinity.

This circular band begins at the apex of a small cross. From this point, 72 Latin letters are inscribed proceeding left to right. These vary by manuscript tradition (e.g. Sloane MS 3853: h, t, o, e, x, o, r, a, b, a, s, l, a, y, q, c, i, y, s, t, a, l, g, a, a, o, n, o, s, v, l, a, r, y, c, e, k, s, p, f, y, o, m, e, n, e, a, u, a, r, e, l, a, t, e, d, a, t, o, n, o, n, a, o, y, l, e, p, o, t, m, a), The complete sequence forms a latin encoding of the seventy-two names of the Shem Ha-Mephorash, which medieval Christian magic links with the 36 decans of astrology.

Within the circular band lies a pentagram centered on a Greek Tau, surrounded by the five letters of the name of God "El" and "Ely", and five other letter combinations (lx, al, a, c, to).

Around the pentagon is a heptagon drawn so that its topmost side touches the uppermost vertex of the pentagram. The seven sides of this heptagon bear the names of seven angels and archangels: Zadkiel, Samael, Zfadkiel, Raphael, Anael, Michael, Gabriel.

The first heptagon is encircled by a heptagram and, outside that, a second concentric heptagon. Their descriptions are more obscure and vary across manuscript illustrations, but typically include seven key points marked with crosses. These points are associated with two sets of divine names. The first set consists of seven three-syllable names of God, each linked to the angel at the nearest vertex: La-ya-ly (Zaphkiel/Zfadkiel), Na-ra-th (Zadkiel), Ly-bar-re (Raphael), Ly-ba-res (Michael), Et-ly-alg (Samael), Ve-h-am (Anael), and Y-al-gal (Gabriel). In the spaces within these crosses, a second set of divine words appears: Vos, Duynas, Gyram, Gram, Aysaram, Alpha, and Omega. A third series includes the sequence El, On, El, On, El, On, Omega. Additionally, four letters, a, g, a, l, are inscribed near several of the crosses. Finally, five more names of God are included: Ely, Eloy, Christ, Sother, and Adonay.

The colour of the seal in the Liber Juratus indicates that the pentagram is usually red or purple with yellow faces. The first heptagon is blue, the second is yellow, the third is also yellow, while the circles are black. The area between the circles and the remaining fields of the figure were to be colored green. Many manuscripts omit colours entirely, and John Dee’s wax exemplars are plain. In magical operations, the seal would be drawn differently – usually on virgin parchment using the blood of moles, pigeons, hoopoes and bats or sometimes cattle, horses, or deer.

=== Clavicula Salomonis ===
Different versions of the Sigillum Dei are known from the tradition of the Clavicula Salomonis, specifically from an Italian manuscript in the collection of Heimann Joseph Michael in the Bodleian Library (MS. Michael 276); and from a 1674 copy by John Aubrey, also in the Bodleian Library (MS. Aubrey 24).

== Early modern ==
One of the oldest surviving manuscripts of the Liber Juratus, dating from the late 14th or the beginning of the 15th century, is Sloane MS 313 from the collection of Hans Sloane in the British Library. It was partly owned by the mathematician and magical experimenter John Dee, in whose Mysteriorum Libri Quinti, or Five books of mystical exercises (1581–1583), the Sigillum Dei played a central role and gained the suffix Sigillum Dei: Emeth or Aemeth ("Truth").

For John Dee, who received the authoritative description of the seal in 1582 via his medium and employee Edward Kelley, this scholarly and antiquarian interest was ultimately subordinate to the purpose of practical application. This contrasts with Athanasius Kircher, who offered a detailed explanation of the Sigillum Dei in his Oedipus aegyptiacus, Kircher rejected magical practice but sought to understand the pagan components to Christianity, Judaism, and Islam to separate the two.
