= Society of the Inner Light =

Magical society founded by Dion Fortune in 1924

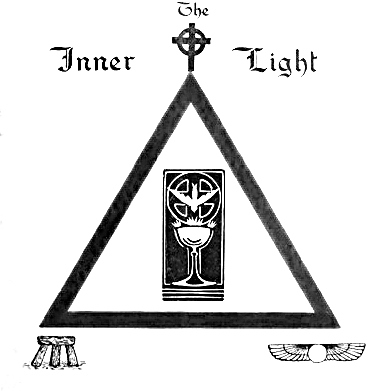
Emblem of the society of the Inner Light

The Society of the Inner Light is a magical society and Western mystery school originally founded as the Fraternity of the Inner Light by Dion Fortune in 1924. It operates from London and accepts pupils.

== History ==
In 1922, after a falling-out with Moina Mathers and with Moina's consent, Dion Fortune left the Alpha et Omega to form an offshoot organization. This indirectly brought new members to the Alpha et Omega. Fortune's group was originally called the "Fraternity of the Inner Light", but was later renamed the Society of the Inner Light.

== Teachings ==
Fortune gave her followers preliminary training by means of correspondence courses, on successful completion of which aspirants were initiated into the Lesser Mysteries, then onto Greater Mysteries. These lesser mysteries were roughly equivalent the Outer Order of the Golden Dawn, and the greater mysteries were roughly equivalent to the old Inner Order of the Rosae Rubae et Aureae Crucis ("Ruby Rose and Golden Cross", or the RR et AC).

During its early years, the Fraternity of the Inner Light used many unchanged versions of the Golden Dawn initiation rituals which, as Francis King notes, had a "semi-amicable relationship" with the Stella Matutina. However, alterations were introduced and eventually the ceremonies used bore no resemblance to those of the Golden Dawn, with the exception that they were constructed on the same principles.

== See also ==
- Divine light
- Margaret Lumley Brown
- Israel Regardie
- Secret Chiefs
