= Alpha et Omega =

Occult organisation

The Alpha et Omega was an occult order, initially named the Hermetic Order of the Golden Dawn, co-founded in London, England by Samuel Liddell MacGregor Mathers in 1888. The Alpha et Omega was one of four daughter organisations into which the Hermetic Order of the Golden Dawn fragmented, the others being the Stella Matutina; the Isis-Urania Temple led by A. E. Waite and others; and Aleister Crowley's A∴A∴. Following a rebellion of adepts in London and an ensuing public scandal which brought the name of the Golden Dawn into disrepute, Mathers renamed the branch of the Golden Dawn remaining loyal to his leadership to "Alpha et Omega" sometime between 1903 and 1913. (Note: McKeown 2001: "The Golden Dawn ceased to exist by that name after October, 1901, replaced by Mathers' Alpha et Omega and the London group's Order of the Morgan Rothe. No longer associated with the SRIA after 1902, Mathers continued to oversee a few temples until his death, when his wife, Moina, assumed supervision.") "The title was usually abbreviated as A.O." and according to some sources its full name was "Rosicrucian Order of Alpha et Omega". All of the temples of the order appear to have gone out of existence by the Second World War.

== Origin ==
In 1900, the hegemony of the Hermetic Order of the Golden Dawn was disturbed by a letter sent from Samuel Mathers, who was living in Paris, to his representative in London, Florence Farr. In the letter he claimed that his co-founder Wynn Westcott forged communications between himself and the Secret Chiefs, who had given him the authority for the Order to exist. This revelation culminated in a rebellion of the adepts of the Isis-Urania Temple No. 3 wherein Mathers was expelled from his position as Chief.

This was quickly followed, in 1901, by the Horos scandal (see Ann O'Delia Diss Debar), in which two con artists used Golden Dawn materials obtained from Mathers to cover a sex scam. The name and reputation of the Golden Dawn were defamed in the courts and in the press. S. L. MacGregor Mathers subsequently dissolved the Order of the Golden Dawn in 1906 and founded the Alpha et Omega in Paris. However, the name A.O. also first appeared in a copy of a 0°=0^{□} Hall of the Neophytes ritual owned by Henry Kelf and is dated 1905. It appears to have been used soon after the schism.

Two temples in Great Britain remained loyal to Mathers and joined the Alpha et Omega, one in London and the other in Edinburgh. Two or three former Golden Dawn temples in the United States, including Thoth-Hermes in Chicago, remained loyal to Mathers during the schism and became part of the Alpha et Omega as well.

== Expansion ==
Elsa Barker, a poet and author who traveled frequently between Europe and the USA, became Mathers' emissary to the American temples of the A.O. For example, the minutes book of the Ahathoor temple mentions that, on 3 July 1911, just prior to Elsa Barker's return to the USA, Mathers had received applications from nine members to form a new temple, Neith Temple No. 10.

By 1913, Mathers was presiding over at least five Temples of the Alpha et Omega; the original Isis-Urania Temple No. 3 (with 23 Inner Order members by 1913), presided over by Dr. Edmund William Berridge, the Ahathoor Temple No. 7 in Paris led by Mathers himself, the Amen-Ra Temple No. 6 in Edinburgh, presided over by John William Brodie-Innes, the Thme Temple No. 8 in Chicago, The Thoth Hermes Temple No. 9 in New York, presided over by Michael Whitty, and the Neith Temple No. 10 in New York.

Three other American temples of the Alpha et Omega were founded after the First World War: Ptah No. 10 in Philadelphia in 1919, Atoum No. 20 in Los Angeles in 1920, and Themis No. 30 in San Francisco in 1921.

When Mathers died in 1918, he was succeeded by Moina Mathers, his widow, and J. W. Brodie-Innes. After Moina's death in St Mary Abbots Hospital on 25 July 1928, Isabel Morgan Boyd, her daughter Isme, and Edward John Langford-Garstin took over the London temple.

== Decline ==
According to Langford-Garstin's cousin Ithell Colquhoun, the AO "survived until the outbreak of [World War II] in 1939" when it was "officially closed" and its temple-furniture destroyed "at the instance of the Secret Chiefs." Colquhoun later asserts that the furniture, along with its Vault of the Adepti, were "consumed in a bonfire" at Sacombe Park, Hertfordshire.

== Rituals ==
While the rituals of the original Hermetic Order of the Golden Dawn and its Stella Matutina offshoot were published in the early 1900s (1909–1910 and 1937 respectively), the rituals of the A+O remained secret until they were published in 2011.

== Challenges and legacy ==
Two famous members of the Alpha et Omega were Dion Fortune (pen name of Violet Firth) and Paul Foster Case. Dion Fortune was initiated into the Alpha et Omega in 1919 and eventually reached the grade of 2°=9^{□}. With the approval of Moina Mathers, Fortune created an outer court for the A+O for the purpose of attracting prospective initiates, initially called the Christian Mystic Lodge of the Theosophical Society, as a "guise", and then later known by its formal title, the Fraternity of Inner Light. In 1922, Dion Fortune published the Esoteric Philosophy of Love and Marriage. Moina Mathers considered this to be an unauthorized expose of secret teachings of the Alpha et Omega, and also, according to author Francis X. King, became concerned about Dion Fortune's increasing skill with astral travel and reception of "trance messages from Masters of the Western Tradition" (see Secret Chiefs). This conflict eventually resulted in Dion Fortune's expulsion from the Alpha et Omega. Fortune later joined the Stella Matutina and attained the grade of 5°=6^{□}. Her expulsion from the A+O and transfer to the S.M. Order occurred while she was simultaneously running her own occult school, which became better known as the Society of the Inner Light.

In 1918, Paul Foster Case was initiated into the Thoth-Hermes Temple of the Alpha et Omega under the direction of Michael Whitty. On 16 May 1920, Case was initiated into the Alpha et Omega's Second Order, and was made a Minor Adept on 6 June 1920. Upon Michael Whitty's death, Paul Foster Case became the Praemonstrator of Thoth Hermes Temple. Shortly thereafter, Moina Mathers wrote to Case criticizing him for discussing teachings concerning esoteric sexuality in the presence of outer order members which provoked Case's resignation as Praemonstrator. When Case began to question certain fundamental teachings of the order, including the system of Enochian magic, Case encountered increasing friction with the Chiefs of Thoth-Hermes temple. In December, 1921, Case therefore wrote to Moina Mathers asking for permission to demit from Thoth-Hermes temple, but was expelled by Mathers instead in January 1922. Case went on to found his own esoteric school, known as the Builders of the Adytum, initially known as the School of Ageless Wisdom. Case's new school moved away from some of the Golden Dawn and A.O. teachings, adopting, for example, a modified version of Arthur Edward Waite's design of the Tarot deck and dispensing with the use of Dee and Kelley's tablets and teachings regarding Enochian magic, in favor of tablets using Qabalistic formulae.

Langford-Garstin was particularly annoyed with the publication of Israel Regardie's Golden Dawn in 1934, a set of four large volumes detailing, according to King, "the majority of the Golden Dawn manuscripts". The first volume of the set contained the knowledge lectures of the Outer Order. King claims that the publication of this had a shattering effect on the Alpha et Omega as well as on the Stella Matutina.

In 1966 a box with some magical tools of the Order of A+O was found on the beach after the cliff gave way dropping them into the sea; a photograph was published in the Daily Telegraph with a notation that they had belonged to a witch.

== Members ==
- Paul Foster Case, an American occultist

== See also ==
- Cipher Manuscripts – Collection of 60 folios regarding magical initiation rituals
- Magical organization – Organization for the practice of occult magic
