= Hermetic Qabalah =

Western esoteric tradition

Hermetic Qabalah (from Hebrew קַבָּלָה (qabalah) 'reception, accounting') is a Western esoteric tradition involving mysticism and the occult. It is the underlying philosophy and framework for magical societies such as the Hermetic Order of the Golden Dawn, has inspired esoteric Christian organizations such as the Societas Rosicruciana in Anglia, is a key element within the Thelemic orders, and is important to certain Western mystical-religious societies.

Hermetic Qabalah arose from Christian Kabbalah, which itself was derived from Jewish Kabbalah, during the European Renaissance, becoming variously Esoteric Christian, non-Christian, or anti-Christian across its different schools in the modern era. It draws on a great many influences, most notably: Kabbalah, Western astrology, Alchemy, Pagan religions, especially Egyptian and Greco-Roman, Neoplatonism, Hermeticism, and the symbolism of the tarot. Hermetic Qabalah differs from the Jewish form in being a more syncretic system; however, it shares many concepts with Jewish Kabbalah.

== Teachings ==
=== Conception of Divinity ===
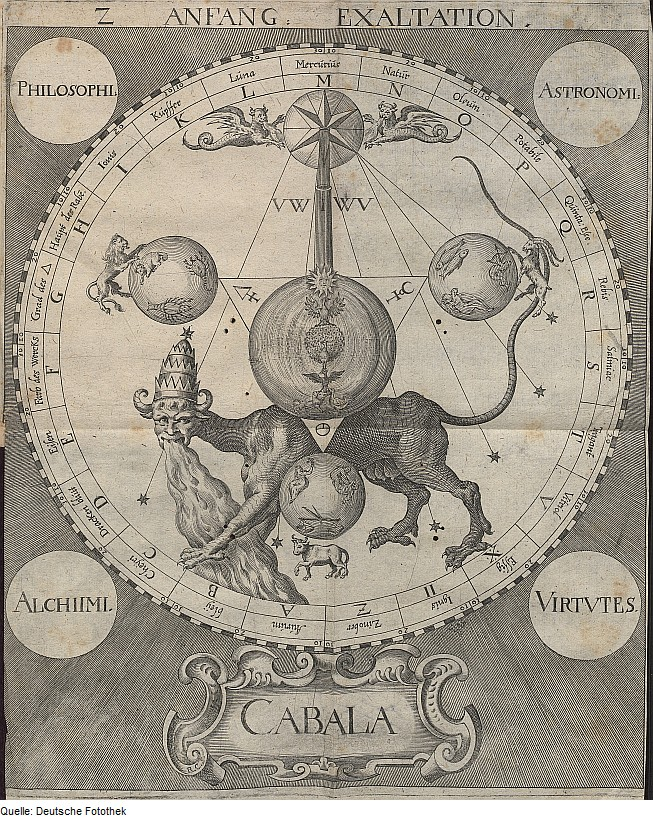
Syncretism of Cabala, Alchemy, Astrology and other esoteric Hermetic disciplines in Stephan Michelspacher's Cabala, Spiegel der Kunst und Natur: in Alchymia (1615)

A primary concern of Hermetic Qabalah is the nature of divinity, its conception of which is quite markedly different from that presented in monotheistic religions; in particular there is not the strict separation between divinity and humankind which is seen in classical monotheism. Hermetic Qabalah adheres to the Neoplatonic conception that the manifest universe, of which material creation is a part, arose as a series of "emanations" from the "godhead".

These emanations arise out of three preliminary states that are considered to precede manifestation. The first is a state of complete nullity, known as Ain (אין "nothing"); the second state, considered a "concentration" of Ain, is Ain Suph (אין סוף "without limit, infinite"); the third state, caused by a "movement" of Ain Suph, is Ain Suph Aur (אין סוף אור "limitless light"), and it is from this initial brilliance that the first emanation of creation originates.

=== Sephiroth ===
The Sephirothic tree showing the lightning flash and the paths

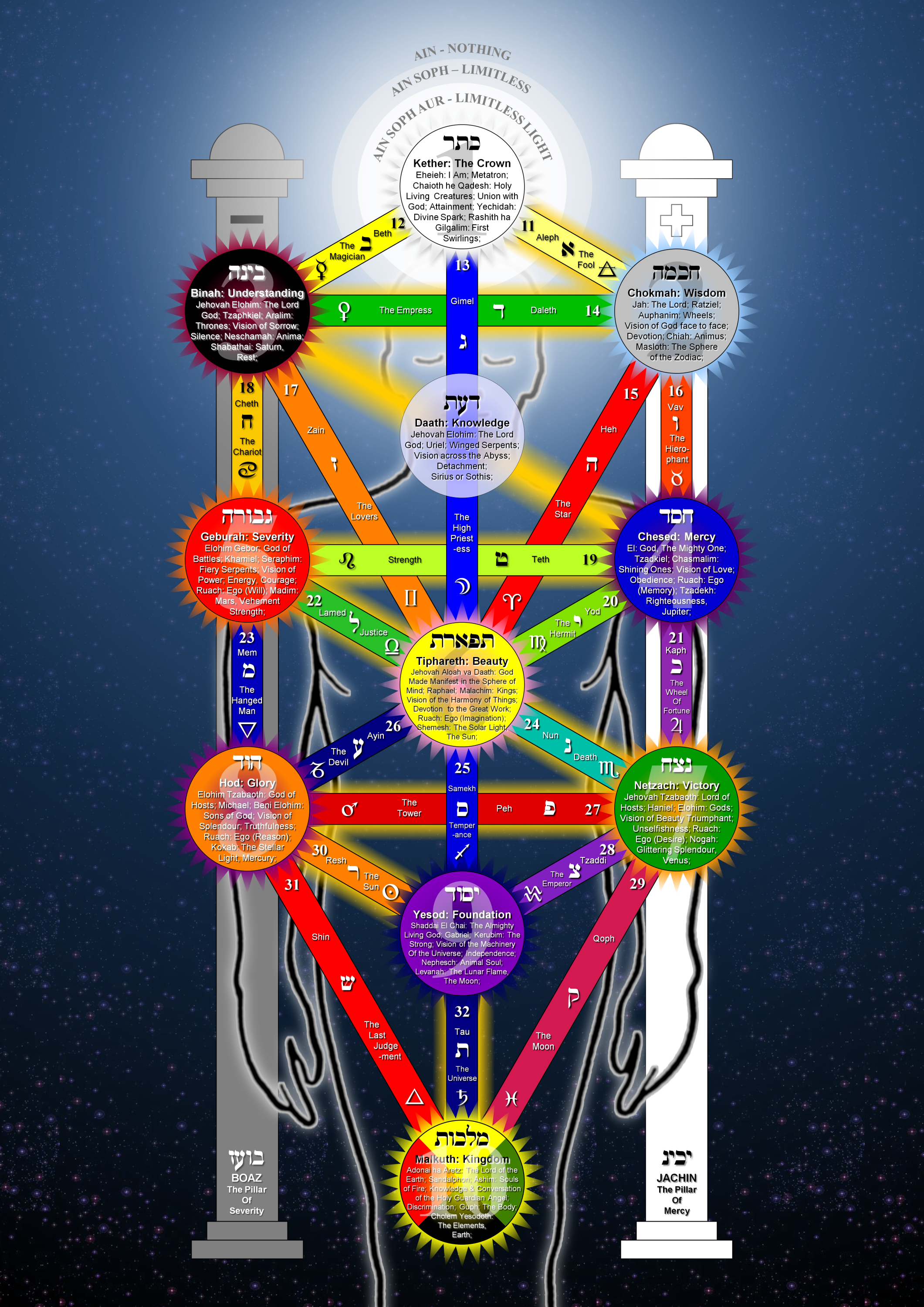
The Qabalistic Tree of Life in the Servants of the Light organisation's Hermetic theory

The emanations of creation arising from Ain Suph Aur are ten in number, and are called Sephiroth (סְפִירוֹת, singular Sephirah סְפִירָה, "enumeration"). These are conceptualised somewhat differently in Hermetic Qabalah to the way they are in Jewish Kabbalah.

From Ain Suph Aur crystallises Kether, the first sephirah of the Hermetic Qabalistic tree of life. From Kether emanate the rest of the sephirot in turn, viz. Kether (1), Chokhmah (2), Binah (3), Daath, Chesed (4), Geburah (5), Tiphareth (6), Netzach (7), Hod (8), Yesod (9), Malkuth (10). Daath is not assigned a number as it is considered part of Binah or a hidden sephirah.

Each sephirah is considered to be an emanation of the divine energy (often described as 'the divine light') which ever flows from the unmanifest, through Kether into manifestation. This flow of light is indicated by the lightning flash shown on diagrams of the sephirotic tree which passes through each sephirah in turn according to their enumerations.

Each sephirah is a nexus of divine energy, and each has a number of attributions. These attributions enable the Qabalist to form a comprehension of each particular sephirah's characteristics. This manner of applying many attributions to each sephirah is an exemplar of the diverse nature of Hermetic Qabalah. For example, the sephirah Hod has the attributions of: Glory, perfect intelligence, the eights of the tarot deck, the planet Mercury, the Egyptian god Thoth, the archangel Michael, the Roman god Mercury and the alchemical element Mercury. The general principle involved is that the Qabalist will meditate on all these attributions and by this means acquire an understanding of the character of the sephirah including all its correspondences.

=== Tarot and the Tree of Life ===
Hermetic Qabalists see the cards of the tarot as keys to the Tree of Life. The 22 cards including the 21 Trumps plus the Fool or Zero card are often called the "Major Arcana" or "Greater Mysteries" and are seen as corresponding to the 22 Hebrew letters and the 22 paths of the Tree; the ace to ten in each suit correspond to the ten Sephiroth in the four Qabalistic worlds; and the sixteen court cards relate to the classical elements in the four worlds. While the sephiroth describe the nature of divinity, the paths between them describe ways of knowing the Divine.

=== Orders of angels ===
According to the Hermetic Order of the Golden Dawn's interpretation of the Kabbalah, there are ten archangels, each commanding one of the choirs of angels and corresponding to one of the Sephirot. It is similar to the Jewish angelic hierarchy.

Rank	Choir of Angels	Translation	Archangel	Sephirah
1	Hayot Ha Kodesh	Holy Living Ones	Metatron	Keter
2	Ophanim	Wheels	Raziel	Chokmah
3	Erelim	Brave ones	Tzaphkiel	Binah
4	Hashmallim	Glowing ones, Amber ones	Tzadkiel	Chesed
5	Seraphim	Burning Ones	Khamael	Geburah
6	Malakim	Messengers, angels	Raphael	Tipheret
7	Elohim	Godly Beings	Haniel	Netzach
8	Bene Elohim	Sons of Elohim	Michael	Hod
9	Cherubim		Gabriel	Yesod
10	Ishim	Men (man-like beings, phonetically similar to "fires")	Sandalphon	Malkuth

== History ==
=== Hermetic views of Qabalah origins ===
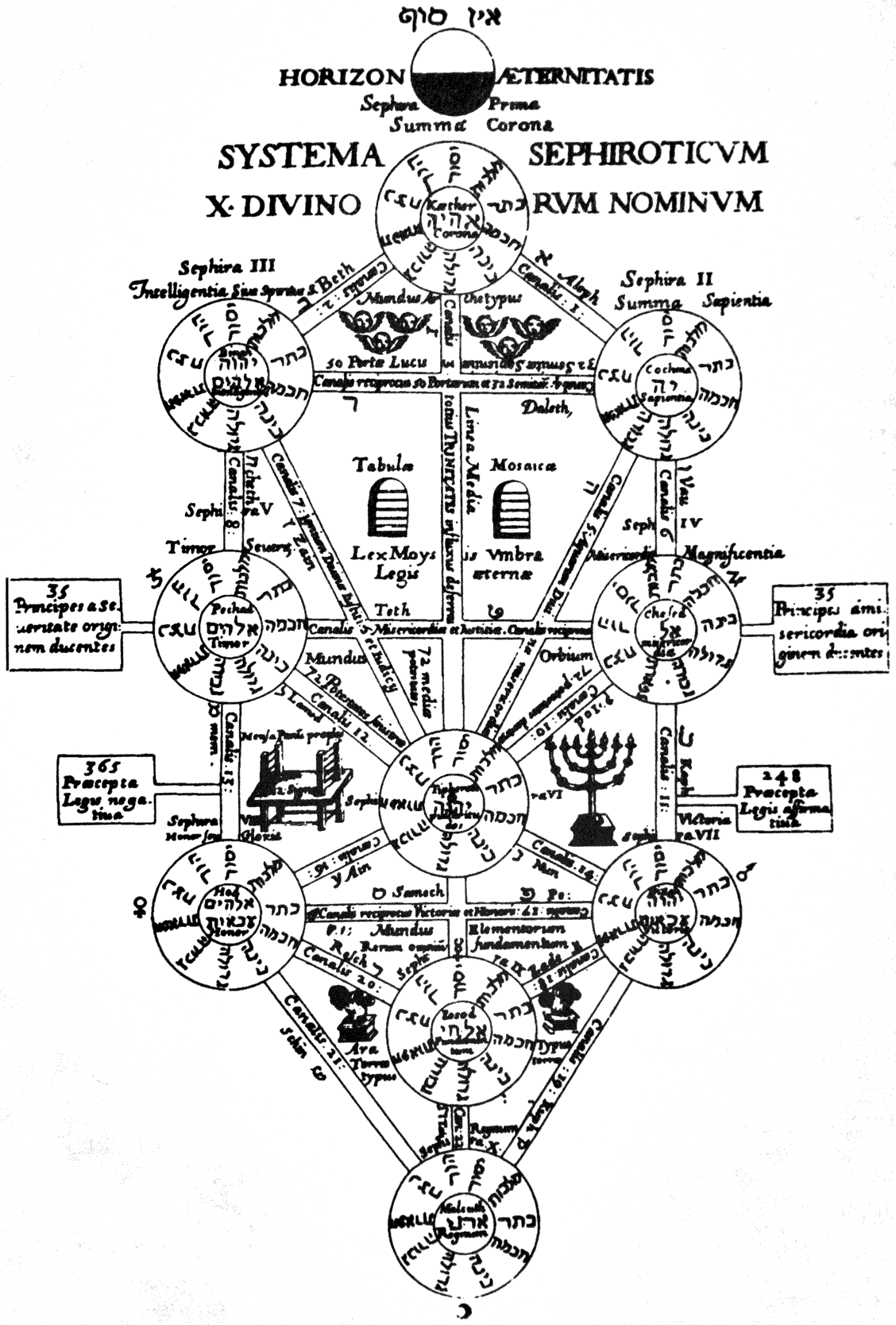
The "Kircher Tree": Athanasius Kircher's 1652 depiction of the Tree of Life, based on a 1625 version by Philippe d'Aquin. This is the most common arrangement of Sephiroth and Paths on the Tree in Hermetic Qabalah.

The practice of using alphabetic letters to represent numbers developed in the Greek city of Miletus, and is thus known as the Milesian system. Early examples include vase graffiti dating to the 6th century BCE. Aristotle wrote that the Pythgoraean tradition, founded in the 6th century BCE by Pythagoras of Samos, practiced isopsephy, the Greek predecessor of Jewish gematria. Pythagoras was a contemporary of the philosophers Anaximander, Anaximenes, and the historian Hecataeus, all of whom lived in Miletus, across the sea from Samos. The Milesian system was in common use by the reign of Alexander the Great (336–323 BCE) and was adopted by other cultures during the subsequent Hellenistic period. It was officially adopted in Egypt during the reign of Ptolemy II Philadelphus (284–246 BCE).

In Isis Unveiled and The Secret Doctrine, 19th-century Theosophist Helena Blavatsky wrote that Hermeticism and Kabbalah ultimately both taught the same secret teachings as Neoplatonism and Hindu philosophy. In the mid-twentieth century, Gershom Scholem hypothesized that Medieval Kabbalah had its roots in an earlier Jewish version of Gnosticism; however, contemporary scholarship of Jewish mysticism has largely rejected this idea. Moshe Idel instead has posited a historical continuity of development from early Jewish mysticism. Modern Hermetics, however, see Qabalah as originating in classical Greece based on Indo-European cultural roots, and only later adopted by Jewish mystics.

=== Renaissance occultism ===
Jewish Kabbalah was absorbed into the Hermetic tradition at least as early as the 15th century when Giovanni Pico della Mirandola promoted a syncretic worldview combining Platonism, Neoplatonism, Aristotelianism, Hermeticism and Kabbalah. Heinrich Cornelius Agrippa (1486–1535), a German magician, occult writer, theologian, astrologer, and alchemist, wrote the influential Three Books of Occult Philosophy, incorporating Kabbalah in its theory and practice of Western magic. It contributed strongly to the Renaissance view of ritual magic's relationship with Christianity. Pico's Hermetic syncretism was further developed by Athanasius Kircher, a Jesuit priest, hermeticist and polymath, who wrote extensively on the subject in 1652, bringing further elements such as Orphism and Egyptian mythology to the mix.

=== Nineteenth-century magical revival ===
Post-Enlightenment Romanticism encouraged societal interest in occultism, of which Hermetic Qabalistic writing was a feature. Francis Barrett's The Magus (1801) handbook of ceremonial magic gained little notice until it influenced the French magical enthusiast Eliphas Levi (1810–1875). Levi presented Qabalism as synonymous with both white and black magic. Levi's innovations included attributing the Hebrew letters to the Tarot cards, thus formulating a link between Western magic and Jewish esotericism which has remained fundamental ever since in Western magic. Levi had a deep impact on the magic of the Hermetic Order of the Golden Dawn.

=== Hermetic Order of the Golden Dawn ===
Hermetic Qabalah was developed extensively by the Hermetic Order of the Golden Dawn, Within the Golden Dawn, the fusing of Qabalistic principles such as the ten Sephiroth with Greek and Egyptian deities was made more cohesive and was extended to encompass other systems such as the Enochian system of angelic magic of John Dee and certain Eastern (particularly Hindu and Buddhist) concepts, all within the structure of a Masonic or Rosicrucian style esoteric order.

Aleister Crowley passed through the Golden Dawn before going on to form his own magical orders. Crowley's book Liber 777 is a good illustration of the wider Hermetic approach. It is a set of tables of correspondences relating various parts of ceremonial magic and Eastern and Western religion to the thirty-two numbers representing the ten spheres (Sephiroth) plus the twenty-two paths of the Qabalistic Tree of Life. The panentheistic nature of Hermetic Qabalists is plainly evident here, as one may simply check the table to see that Chesed (חסד "Mercy") corresponds to Jupiter, Isis, the colour blue (on the Queen Scale), Poseidon, Brahma, and amethyst.

=== Aftermath of the Golden Dawn ===
Many of the Golden Dawn's rituals were published by Crowley, some altered in various ways to align them with his own New Aeon magickal approach. Israel Regardie eventually compiled the more traditional forms of these rituals and published them in book form.

Dion Fortune, an initiate of Alpha et Omega (an offshoot of the Hermetic Order of the Golden Dawn), who went on to found the Fraternity of the Inner Light wrote The Mystical Qabalah, considered by her biographers to be one of the best general introductions to modern Hermetic Qabalah.

=== A∴A∴ and Ordo Templi Orientis ===
After the dissolution of the Hermetic Order of the Golden Dawn, Crowley integrated Hermetic Qabalah into his new religious philosophy, Thelema. Crowley's works, such as Magick, 777, and The Book of Thoth emphasize the Tree of Life and Sephiroth, utilizing Qabalistic principles to explore human consciousness and spiritual growth. Thelema's development continued through organizations like the Ordo Templi Orientis (O.T.O.) and the A∴A∴, which further embedded Hermetic Qabalah into their rituals and teachings, perpetuating its influence within modern esoteric practices.

== English Qabalah ==
There are various systems of English gematria, sometimes referred to as English Qabalah, that are related to Hermetic Qabalah. These systems interpret the letters of the Roman script or English alphabet via an assigned set of numeric values.

=== Liber Trigrammaton ===
In 1904, Aleister Crowley wrote out the text of the foundational document of his world-view, known as Liber AL vel Legis, The Book of the Law. In this text was the injunction found at verse II:55; "Thou shalt obtain the order & value of the English Alphabet, thou shalt find new symbols to attribute them unto" which was understood by Crowley as referring to an English Qabalah yet to be developed or revealed. In one of the Holy Books of Thelema written by Aleister Crowley in 1907, called Liber Trigrammaton, sub figura XXVII -- Being the Book of the Mutations of the Tao with the Yin and the Yang, are 27 three-line diagrams known as 'trigrams', which are composed of a solid line for the Yang, a broken line for the Yin, and a point for the Tao. By attributing 26 Roman script letters to the trigrams of this work, Crowley felt that he had fulfilled the injunction to "obtain the order & value of the English Alphabet", as noted in his 'Old Comment' to The Book of the Law. However, he also wrote that "The attribution in Liber Trigrammaton is good theoretically; but no Qabalah of merit has risen therefrom."

Due to its cryptic nature, Liber Trigrammaton has been the subject of various interpretations by Thelemic scholars and practitioners. It is often analyzed in conjunction with other works by Crowley and the broader context of Thelemic teachings. Its trigrams are sometimes correlated with the I Ching and other systems of divination and symbolism.

=== Trigrammaton Qabalah ===
The interpretation known as Trigrammaton Qabalah (TQ) was first published by R. Leo Gillis in 1996, and subsequently released as The Book of Mutations in 2002. This system is based on marginal notes written by Aleister Crowley in his copy of Liber Trigrammaton, one of the Holy Books of Thelema he received in 1907. Its full title is Liber Trigrammaton, sub figura XXVII -- Being the Book of the Mutations of the Tao with the Yin and the Yang. Liber Trigrammaton (aka Liber XXVII) was described by Crowley as "the ultimate foundation of the highest theoretical qabalah". Gillis gave correspondences to his interpretations of forms of divination such as the I Ching, Tarot and runes, as well as Greek and Hebrew alphabets, the Tree of Life, Western and Vedic astrology, magic squares, and the Platonic solids. A primary feature of this qabalah is his attributions to the Cube of Space and its 26 components of edges, faces, and vertices, which equal the number of letters in the English alphabet.

=== English Qaballa ===
English Qaballa (EQ) is a Qabalah supported by a system of arithmancy created by James Lees in 1976. It assigns numerical values to the English alphabet to interpret esoteric texts, particularly The Book of the Law. Initially overlooked, the system gained recognition through Cath Thompson's publications, which detailed its methods and applications. EQ provides an alternative to traditional Hebrew and Hermetic Qabalah, emphasizing the linguistic and numerical properties of English.

Various Thelemic practitioners use English Qaballa in rituals and textual analysis, exploring its unique insights into Crowley's work. Ongoing research continues to expand its applications within modern occult practices, demonstrating its adaptability and relevance. This system offers a distinct perspective on esoteric interpretation, contributing to a deeper understanding of Thelemic texts and practices. Lon Milo DuQuette has praised the system for its innovative approach.

== See also ==
- Kabbalah
- Practical Kabbalah
- Christian Kabbalah
- English Qaballa
- Chesed (Kabbalah)
- Christian mysticism
- Goetia
- Magick
- Thaumaturgy
- Theurgy
