= Cube of Space =

Occult concept

The Cube of Space is an occult concept popularized by occultist Paul Foster Case. The Cube of Space associates the center point of the cube, its three axes, six faces, and 12 edges of the cube with the 22 letters of the Hebrew alphabet. The Cube of Space is based upon two verses in the proto-kabbala text called the Sepher Yetzirah; one of the verses is in chapter four and the other is in chapter five. Chapter four's verse associates 6 Hebrew letters with the 6 cardinal directions: up, down, east, west, north, and south, and chapter five's verse associates 12 Hebrew letters with either 12 diagonal directional 'arms' or 12 diagonal boundaries.

Different translations contradict each other; with some interpreting the 12 Hebrew letters as referring to the 12 edges of an octahedron while others like Paul Foster Case interpreted these as the 12 edges of a cube. In the most authoritative English translation of the Sepher Yetzirah, scholar Aryeh Kaplan, interprets chapter five, verse two, as describing a cube. However, another occult author, Kevin Townley, explains a cosmology of an octahedron within a cube.
