= Moina Mathers =

French artist (1865–1928)

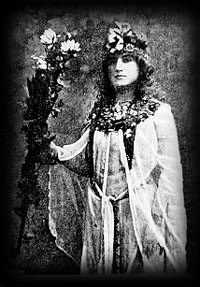
Moina Mathers in Egyptian garb for her performance of the Rites of Isis in Paris, 1899

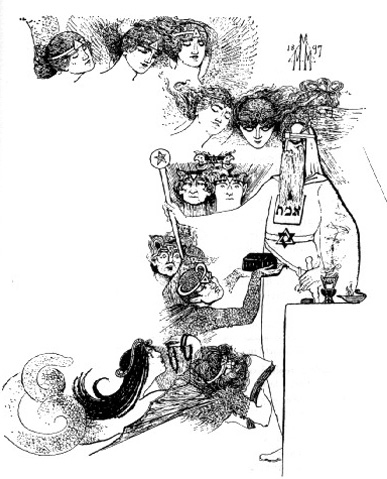
Drawing rendered by Moina Mathers for Samuel Liddell MacGregor Mathers' translation of the "Sacred Magic of Abramelin the Mage." (1897)

Moina Mathers, born Mina Bergson (28 February 1865 – 25 July 1928), was an artist and occultist at the turn of the 20th century. She was the sister of French philosopher Henri Bergson, the first man of Jewish descent to be awarded the Nobel Prize for Literature in 1927. She is, however, more known for her marriage to the English occultist, Samuel Liddell MacGregor Mathers, one of the founders of the organisation Hermetic Order of the Golden Dawn and, after his death in 1918, for being the head of a successor organisation, called the Rosicrucian Order of Alpha et Omega. Her creative work and influence left a lasting impression on the symbolism, regalia, temple design and ritual of occult practices in the West.

== Early life ==
Moina, was born Mina, or Minna, in Geneva, Switzerland, to an influential Polish-Jewish family from her father's side, and English and Irish from her mother's side. The family moved to Paris when she was two years old. Her father, pianist and composer Michel Bergson, achieved some musical success in composing the operas Louisa de Montfort and Salvator Rosa. He was a native of Warsaw from the influential Bereksohn family. Her grandfather, Jacob Levison (born c. 1799) was a surgeon and a dentist. Her grandmother Katherine Levison, was born in London in c. 1800. Her maternal aunt was Minna Preuss, born in Hull, Yorkshire, in 1835, and her mother, Kate, née Levison, was also born in Yorkshire. Her eldest brother Henri Bergson, 1859–1941, joined the faculty of the College of France, later won the Nobel Prize and is best known for authoring the philosophical work Creative Evolution. He was also the president of the British Society for Psychical Research.

A talented artist, Moina enrolled at the Slade School of Art at the age of fifteen. At the turn of the 19th century the Slade was known for encouraging young women in the Arts. Moina was awarded a scholarship and four merit certificates for drawing at the school. She became friends with Beatrice Offor, with whom she shared a studio. It was also at the Slade in 1882, that Moina met her future friend Annie Horniman, who would become the major financial sponsor for the Mathers as struggling artists and occultists, by backing the Hermetic Order of the Golden Dawn.

== Marriage and occult career ==
Moina met her husband Samuel Liddell MacGregor Mathers in 1887, while studying at the British Museum, where Samuel was a frequent patron.

A year later, he founded the Hermetic Order of the Golden Dawn, one of the most influential organisations in the Western Mystery Tradition. Moina was the first initiate of this Order in March, 1888. Her chosen motto in the Golden Dawn was Vestigia Nulla Retrorsum ("Prudence never retraces its steps" or, "Never a backward step"). A year later in 1890, they married and Mina Bergson became Moina Mathers to honour her Irish roots.

Moina took on the role of High Priestess, while Mathers served as the Magus. In their occult partnership, her husband was described as the "evoker of spirits" and Moina as the clairvoyant "seeress", who often illustrated what her husband evoked. Moina designed rites and rituals for the group as well as being medium and diviner. In March 1899, they performed the rites of the Egyptian goddess Isis, on the stage of the Théâtre La Bodinière in Paris.

Moina contributed her art training as well as her esoteric work. She applied Egyptian symbolism to the design of ritual chambers and temple furnishings for the Golden Dawn. She created regalia, ceremonial diagrams, and some of the original designs for the Golden Dawn Tarot. After the Golden Dawn dissolved, she continued her work with the Rosicrucian Order of Alpha et Omega (R.R. et A.C.), in the design and decoration of the Ahathoor Temple in Paris, Her creative work and influence left a lasting impression on the "look" and ritual of occult practices in the West.

== Disputes ==
The Mathers moved from England to Paris under a cloud, the Golden Dawn crumbled due to their absence from London, and Horniman since becoming a member and initiate, eventually fell out with Moina Mathers, cutting off her financial support.

In 1906, Moina and Samuel established the Rosicrucian Order of Alpha et Omega (A.O.), the third one founded by the couple.

Their living conditions worsened, they changed locations frequently, and the turn of the century brought litigation notably from Aleister Crowley, unwanted publicity, and schism.

Her husband died in 1918 during the Spanish flu epidemic, leaving Moina financially strapped. Moina took over the Alpha et Omega, a successor organisation to the Golden Dawn, as its Imperatrix, running it for nine years.

During this time Mathers herself was involved in a bitter clash with initiate and rival Dion Fortune, her former protégé whom she accused of revealing secrets of the Order.

== Death ==
After declining health, Moina Mathers died in July 1928 in St Mary Abbots Hospital, aged 63. The cause of death was unclear but thought to be from self starvation.

== See also ==
- The Book of Abramelin
- Magic
- Occultism
- List of Occultists
