= List of occult writers =

This is a list of notable occult writers.

== A ==
- Evangeline Adams – American astrologer (1868–1932)
- Heinrich Cornelius Agrippa – German occult writer (1486–1535)
- Albertus Magnus – German Dominican friar and saint (c. 1200 – 1280)
- Alipili – German alchemical writer
- Margot Anand – French writer, teacher, seminar leader and public speaker
- Victor Anderson – American poet, co-founder of Feri Tradition
- Antero Alli – Finnish astrologer (1952–2023)
- Apollonius of Tyana – Greek Neopythagorean philosopher (c.15–100)
- Dolores Ashcroft-Nowicki – British occult writer and psychic (1929–2026)
- Elias Ashmole – English antiquarian, politician, officer of arms, astrologer and alchemist
- Freya Aswynn – Dutch musician and Pagan
- William Walker Atkinson – American writer and occultist (1862–1932)

== B ==
- Alice Bailey – American esoteric, theosophist and writer (1880–1949)
- Mrs. L. Dow Balliett – American writer, clubwoman (1847–1929)
- Franz Bardon – Czech occult writer (1909–1958)
- Francis Barrett – English occultist
- John G. Bennett – British academic and writer (1897–1974)
- Philip Berg – American rabbi and dean of the Kabbalah Centre
- Raymond Bernard – French esotericist (1923–2006)
- Michael Bertiaux – American occultist (born 1935)
- Annie Besant – English writer and activist (1847–1933)
- Hakim Bey – American political writer, poet, and essayist (1945–2022)
- Paul Beyerl – American Wiccan priest
- Steve Blamires – British historian
- Helena Blavatsky – Russian-American mystic and writer (1831–1891)
- Kerry Bolton – New Zealand far-right political activist
- Gavin Bone – British occult writer (b. 1964)
- Isaac Bonewits – American Neopagan leader and writer (1949–2012)
- William Breeze – American occult writer
- Brother XII – British mystic (1878–1934)
- Jacques Breyer – French esoteric writer (1922–1996)
- Thomas Browne – English polymath and writer (1605–1682)
- Giordano Bruno – Italian Dominican friar, philosopher and mathematician (1548–1600)
- Raymond Buckland – English writer on the subject of Wicca and the occult
- Zsuzsanna Budapest – American feminist writer (b. 1940)
- E. A. Wallis Budge – British academic (1857–1934)
- Edward Bulwer-Lytton – British statesman and writer (1803–1873)
- W. E. Butler – British occultist and writer (1898–1978)

== C ==
- Laurie Cabot – American high priestess, writer (born 1933)
- Margaret Cameron – American writer and musician (1867–1947)
- Baba Raúl Cañizares – Cuban priest
- Philip Carr-Gomm – English writer (b. 1955)
- Hereward Carrington – American psychic investigator and writer
- Peter J. Carroll – British occultist and writer (1953–2026)
- Paul Foster Case – American occultist (1884–1954)
- Carlos Castaneda – American anthropologist and writer (1925–1998)
- Richard Cavendish – British historian and writer
- Edgar Cayce – American clairvoyant (1877–1945)
- Lucille Cedercrans – American mystic
- Cheiro – Irish astrologer, palmist, and numerologist
- Jean Chevalier – French writer, philosopher, and theologian
- Andrew D. Chumbley – British occult writer
- Chic Cicero – American occult writer (b. 1936)
- Sandra Tabatha Cicero – American esoteric writer and lecturer
- Lewis de Claremont – American occult writer
- Chas S. Clifton – American academic, author and historian
- Frank Collin – American white supremacist (born 1944)
- John Robert Colombo – Canadian writer, editor, and poet
- D. J. Conway – American novelist (1939–2019)
- Marie Corelli – English novelist (1855–1924)
- Mary A. Cornelius – American writer and temperance reformer (1829–1918)
- Aleister Crowley – English occultist (1875–1947)
- Vivianne Crowley – English writer and Wiccan priestess
- Patricia Crowther – British occultist and Wiccan (1927–2025)
- Scott Cunningham – American writer
- Phyllis Curott – American priestess, attorney, and writer

== D ==
- Ernesto de Martino – Italian anthropologist, philosopher and historian
- Arthur Dee – English physician and alchemist (1579–1651)
- John Dee – English scientist and occultist (1527–1608/09)
- Peter Deunov – Bulgarian philosopher and spiritual teacher (1864 – 1944)
- Savitri Devi – Greek Nazi spy and occultist (1905–1982)
- Nevill Drury – Australian editor and publisher (1947–2013)
- Gerina Dunwich – American astrologer, occult historian
- Lon Milo DuQuette – American writer, lecturer, musician, and occultist

== E ==
- Robert Lee "Skip" Ellison – American druid priest, ADF Archdruid from 2001 to 2010
- Gérard Encausse – French physician, hypnotist, and occultist
- Julius Evola – Italian radical-right philosopher and esotericist (1898–1974)

== F ==
- Janet Farrar – British writer and Wiccan priestess
- Stewart Farrar – British writer and Wiccan (1916–2000)
- LaSara FireFox – American writer
- Ed Fitch – American writer (1937–2024)
- Stephen Flowers – American runologist, writer, and occultist
- Dion Fortune – British occultist and writer (1890–1946)
- Fulcanelli – French alchemist and esoteric writer (fl. 1920s)
- J. F. C. Fuller – British Army general (1878–1966)

== G ==
- Yasmine Galenorn
- Ann-Marie Gallagher – British writer
- Henri Gamache – American writer
- Gerald Gardner – British Wiccan leader (1884–1964)
- Peter H. Gilmore – American LaVeyan Satanist writer (born 1958)
- Migene González-Wippler – Puerto Rican writer
- Kenneth Grant – English occultist and writer (1924–2011)
- William G. Gray – English occult writer (1913–1992)
- Raven Grimassi – American writer (1951–2019)
- René Guénon – French intellectual (1886–1951)
- Rosemary Ellen Guiley – American writer
- George Gurdjieff – Russian Empire mystic and writer (c. 1866–1877 – 1949)

== H ==
- Manly P. Hall – Canadian-American philosopher and writer (1901–1990)
- Bruce Barrymore Halpenny – English military historian and writer (1937–2015)
- Erik Jan Hanussen – Austrian publicist and clairvoyant (1889–1933)
- Jesse Wolf Hardin – American writer
- Michael Harner – American anthropologist and neo-shamanist (1929–2018)
- Franz Hartmann – German occultist, geomancer and astrologer
- Max Heindel – American astrologer and occultist
- Hermes Trismegistus – Legendary author of the Hermetica
- Phil Hine – British occult writer
- Johann Georg Hohman – American occultist
- Hans Holzer – American writer and parapsychologist
- Murry Hope – English writer and occultist
- Ellic Howe – British astrologer and writer
- Paul Huson – British writer and artist (born 1942)
- Christopher Hyatt – American psychologist, occultist and writer

== I ==
- Iamblichus – Neoplatonist philosopher and mystic (c. 245 – c. 325)
- Judika Illes – American occult writer

== J ==
- Hargrave Jennings – British occult writer (1817–1890)
- Charles Stansfeld Jones – Canadian writer, occultist and magician (1886–1950)
- William Quan Judge – Irish-American Theosophist (1851–1896)
- Carl Jung – Swiss psychiatrist and psychotherapist (1875–1961)

== K ==
- Amber K – American writer
- Richard Kaczynski – American occult psychology writer
- Allan Kardec – French educator, translator, and writer (1804–1869)
- Jozef Karika – Slovak experimental publicist and writer (born 1978)
- Jan Kefer – Czech astrologer and hermeticist
- Francis X. King – British occult writer (1934–1994)
- Anna Kingsford – English physician and social reformer (1846–1888)
- Kenny Klein – American musician and writer (1955–2020)
- Donald Michael Kraig – American occult writer
- Giuliano Kremmerz – Italian alchemist (1861–1930)
- Dora Kunz – American writer (1904–1999)

== L ==
- Roger de Lafforest – French writer
- Stephen Larsen – American psychologist
- L. W. de Laurence – American occult and spiritual author and publisher
- Anton LaVey – American writer and Satanist (1930–1997)
- Charles Webster Leadbeater – British Theosophist and writer (1854–1934)
- Giustiniano Lebano – Italian lawyer and patriot (1832–1910)
- Sybil Leek – British astrologer
- Éliphas Lévi – French occult writer and poet (1810–1875)
- Harvey Spencer Lewis – American writer and mystic (1883–1939)
- Guido von List – Austrian occultist and writer (1848–1919)
- H. P. Lovecraft – American writer (1890–1937)

== M ==
- Simon Magus – Religious figure who confronted Peter
- Nicholas Mann – British writer
- Al G. Manning – American occult writer (1927–2006)
- Anthony Marais – American writer, musician, and academic (born 1966)
- Leo Martello – American activist and Wiccan priest (1930–2000)
- Louis Martinié – American vodou practitioner
- Martinus – Danish mystic (1890–1981)
- Samuel Liddell MacGregor Mathers – British occultist (1854–1918)
- John and Caitlin Matthews – English writers
- Giovanni Pico della Mirandola – Italian Renaissance philosopher (1463–1494)
- Patricia Monaghan – American writer (1946–2012)
- Robert Monroe – American radio broadcaster and writer
- Dorothy Morrison – American writer (b. 1955)
- Ann Moura – American writer
- Joseph Murphy – American writer (1898–1981)
- David Myatt – British writer and religious leader (born 1950)

== N ==
- Nema Andahadna – American occult writer (1939–2018)
- Vicki Noble – American writer (b. 1947)
- Nostradamus – French astrologer and seer (1503–1566)
- Novalis – German aristocrat and polymath (1772–1801)

== O ==
- Alfred Richard Orage – British literary figure (1873–1934)
- P. D. Ouspensky – Russian esotericist (1878–1947)

== P ==
- Paracelsus – Swiss physician, philosopher, theologian, and alchemist (c. 1493 – 1541)
- Jack Parsons – American rocket engineer (1914–1952)
- Joséphin Péladan – French novelist and Rosicrucian (1858–1918)
- Gwydion Pendderwen – American musician (1946–1982)
- Fernando Pessoa – Portuguese poet, writer, and philosopher (1888–1935)
- Robert M. Place – American artist and writer (born 1947)
- Rachel Pollack – American writer (1945–2023)
- Arthur E. Powell – Welsh theosophist (1882–1969)
- James Morgan Pryse – American Theosophist (1849–1942)
- Ali Puli – German alchemical writer

== R ==
- Paschal Beverly Randolph – American physician, occultist and writer (1825–1875)
- Silver RavenWolf – American writer
- Israel Regardie – English occultist 1907–1985)
- Wilhelm Reich – Austrian psychoanalyst (1897–1957)
- Theodor Reuss – German occultist, journalist, and singer
- Jane Roberts – American poet and psychic (1929–1984)
- Helena Roerich – Russian philosopher (1879–1955)
- D. Scott Rogo – American writer and parapsychologist (1950–1990)
- Gabrielle Roth – American musician and dancer (1941–2012)
- Subba Row – Indian Theosophist (1856–1890)
- Jozef Rulof – Dutch psychic (1898–1952)

== S ==
- Torkom Saraydarian – American writer and musician (1917–1997)
- Gershom Scholem – Israeli philosopher and historian (1897–1982)
- Gini Graham Scott – American songwriter
- William Seabrook – American journalist (1884–1945)
- M. R. Sellars – American novelist
- Sepharial – British writer and astrologer
- Miguel Serrano – Chilean diplomat and esoteric fascist (1917–2009)
- Idries Shah – Afghan writer and Sufi teacher (1924–1996)
- Walter Siegmeister – American esoteric writer (1903–1965)
- Robin Skelton – Canadian academic, writer, poet, and anthologist (1925 –1997)
- Stephen Skinner – Australian writer, editor, publisher and lecturer
- Lionel Snell – English writer, magician and publisher
- Austin Osman Spare – English artist (1886–1956)
- Lewis Spence – British academic (1874–1955)
- Starhawk – American feminist and writer (born 1951)
- Brad Steiger – American writer (1936–2018)
- Rudolf Steiner – Austrian esotericist (1861–1925)
- Robert John Stewart – Scottish composer, writer and teacher
- Montague Summers – English writer (1880–1948)
- Emanuel Swedenborg – Swedish scientist, philosopher, and theologian (1688–1772)

== T ==
- Ralph Tegtmeier – German occult writer
- Luisah Teish – American spiritual writer
- Patricia Telesco – American writer, and lecturer
- Max Théon – Polish Hermetic Kabbalist (1848–1927)
- Johannes Trithemius – German Benedictine abbot and polymath (1462–1516)
- Paul Twitchell – American writer and spiritual teacher

== U ==
- Mellie Uyldert – Dutch astrologer

== V ==
- Doreen Valiente – English Wiccan writer (1922–1999)

== W ==
- A. E. Waite – British poet and mystic (1857–1942)
- Ed and Lorraine Warren – American paranormal investigators and authors
- James Wasserman – American writer (1948–2020)
- Don Webb – American novelist
- Sam Webster – American occult writer
- Samael Aun Weor – Colombian gnostic writer
- William Wynn Westcott – British Freemason and occult writer (1848–1925)
- Dennis Wheatley – British writer (1897–1977)
- Henry S. Whitehead – American novelist (1882-1932)
- Migene González-Wippler – Puerto Rican writer
- Colin Wilson – English writer (1931–2013)
- Peter Lamborn Wilson – American political writer, poet, and essayist (1945–2022)
- Robert Anton Wilson – American writer and futurist (1932–2007)
- Oswald Wirth – Swiss artist and occult writer

== Y ==
- W. B. Yeats – Irish poet and playwright (1865–1939)
- Francis Parker Yockey – American fascist writer (1917–1960)
- Paramahansa Yogananda – Indian and American yogi and guru (1893–1952)
- Catherine Yronwode – American comic book writer and editor (born 1947)

== Z ==
- Julius and Agnes Zancig – American stage magicians and writers
- Morning Glory Zell-Ravenheart – American writer and Neopagan priestess (1948–2014)
- Oberon Zell-Ravenheart – American writer and Neopagan leader

== See also ==
- List of occult terms
- List of occultists
