= Arkana Publishing =

Arkana Publishing (or Penguin Arkana or just Arkana) is a publishing imprint of Penguin Group of mainly esoteric literature.

== Authors ==
- Carlos Castaneda
- Alfred Douglas
- Michael Baigent
- Karlfried Graf Dürckheim
- P. D. Ouspensky
- Robin Skelton
- Robert John Stewart
- Richard Wilhelm
- Joseph Campbell
- G.I. Gurdjieff
- Arthur Koestler
- Idries Shah
- Maharishi Mahesh Yogi

== Books ==
Title	Author	Year	ISBN
Journey to Ixtlan: Lessons of Don Juan	Carlos Castaneda	1972	ISBN 0-14-019234-4
The Tarot: The Origins, Meaning and Uses of the Cards	Alfred Douglas	1972	ISBN 0-14-019239-5
Letters from Russia-1919	P. D. Ouspensky (Introduction by Fairfax Hall and epilog from In Denikin's Russia by C. E. Bechhofer)	1978	ISBN
The Pocket I Ching: The Richard Wilhelm Translation	Richard Wilhelm, Cary F. Baynes, W. S. Boardman	1984	ISBN 1-85063-000-3
The Secret of the Golden Flower: A Chinese Book of Life	Richard Wilhelm, Carl Gustav Jung	1984	ISBN 1-85063-005-4
Tao Te Ching: The Book of Meaning and Life	Richard Wilhelm	1985	ISBN 1-85063-011-9
A Further Record: Extracts from Meetings 1928–1945	P. D. Ouspensky	1986	ISBN
The Mystic Life of Merlin	R. J. Stewart, Geoffrey of Monmouth	1986	ISBN 1-85063-042-9
The prophetic vision of Merlin: prediction, psychic transformation, and the foundation of the Grail legends in an ancient set of visionary verses	Robert John Stewart	1986	ISBN 1-85063-018-6
The Book of the Dead	E. A. Wallis Budge (introduction by David Lorimer)	1989	ISBN 0-14-019009-0
Chiron and the Healing Journey	Melanie Reinhart	1989	ISBN 0-14-019209-3
The Confessions of Aleister Crowley: An Autohagiography	John Symonds, Kenneth Grant	1989	ISBN 0-14-019189-5
The Arkana Dictionary of Astrology	Fred Gettings	1990	ISBN 0-14-019287-5
Earth, Air, Fire, Water: Pre-Christian and Pagan Elements in British Songs, Rhymes and Ballads	Margaret Blackwood, Robin Skelton	1990	ISBN 0-14-019227-1
The Second Ring of Power	Carlos Castaneda	1990	ISBN 0-14-019235-2
Tales of Power	Carlos Castaneda	1990 (1974, Simon & Schuster)	ISBN 0-14-019237-9
Whole in One	David Lorimer	1990	ISBN 0-14-019258-1
Teachings of Gurdjieff - A Pupil's Journal	Charles Stanley Nott (1961)	1990	ISBN 0-14-019156-9
The Eagle's Gift	Carlos Castaneda	1992 (1981, Pocket Books)	ISBN 0-14-019233-6
A Separate Reality: Further Conversations with Don Juan	Carlos Castaneda	1998 (1972, Pocket Books)	ISBN 0-14-019236-0
Chiron and the Healing Journey: An Astrological and Psychological Perspective	Melanie Reinhart	1999	ISBN 0-14-019573-4
The Masks of God: Primitive Mythology; Vol. 1	Joseph Campbell	1992	ISBN 0-14-019443-6
The Masks of God: Oriental Mythology; Vol. 2	Joseph Campbell	1992	ISBN 0-14-019442-8
The Masks of God: Occidental Mythology; Vol. 3	Joseph Campbell	1992	ISBN 978-0-14-019441-8
The Masks of God: Creative Mythology; Vol. 4	Joseph Campbell	1992	ISBN 0-14-019440-1
Myths To Live By	Joseph Campbell	1993	ISBN 0-14-019461-4
Beelzububs Tales to his Grandson: All and Everything. First Series	G.I. Gurdjieff	2000	ISBN 0-14-019473-8
Meetings With Remarkable Men: All and Everything. Second Series	G.I. Gurdjieff	1988	ISBN 0-14-019037-6
Life is Real Only Then, When I Am: All and Everything. Third Series	G.I. Gurdjieff	1999	ISBN 0-14-019585-8
The Sleepwalkers: A History of Man's Changing Vision of the Universe	Arthur Koestler	1989	ISBN 0-14-019246-8
The Act of Creation	Arthur Koestler	1989	ISBN 0-14-019191-7
The Ghost in the Machine	Arthur Koestler	1989	ISBN 0-14-019192-5
The Way of the Sufi	Idries Shah	1991	ISBN 0-14-019252-2
Oriental Magic	Idries Shah	1993	ISBN 0-14-019464-9
Learning How to Learn: Psychology and Spirituality in the Sufi Way	Idries Shah	1996	ISBN 0-14-019513-0
The Magical Arts	Richard Cavendish	1989	ISBN 0-14-019152-6
Daimonic Reality: Field Guide to the Otherworld	Patrick Harpur	1995	ISBN 0-14-019485-1
The Farther Reaches of Human Nature	Abraham H. Maslow	1994	ISBN 0-14-019470-3
The Magus of Strovolos: The Extraordinary World of a Spiritual Healer	Kyriacos C. Markides	1988	ISBN 0-14-019034-1
Homage to the Sun	Kyriacos C. Markides	1990	ISBN 0-14-019024-4
Atlantis: Myth or Reality	Murry Hope	1991	ISBN 0-14-019232-8
The Case for Astrology	John Anthony West	1992	ISBN 0-14-019280-8
Inner Visions	Nevill Drury	1994	ISBN 0-14-019283-2
The Hidden Tradition in Europe: The Secret History of Medieval Christian Heresy	Yuri Stoyanov	1994	ISBN 0-14-019319-7
Mysticism and the New Physics	Michael Talbot	1993	ISBN 0-14-019328-6
Zen in the Art of Archery: Training the Mind and Body to Become One	Eugen Herrigel	1985	ISBN 978-1-85063-029-6
On Having No Head: Zen and the Rediscovery of the Obvious	Douglas Harding	1991	ISBN 0-14-019043-0
The Book of Chaung Tzu	Martin Palmer, Elizabeth Breuilly	1996	ISBN 0-14-019488-6
Sacred Origins of Profound Things	Charles Panati	1997	ISBN 0-14-019544-0
The Myth of the Goddess: Evolution of an Image	Anne Baring, Jules Cashford	1993	ISBN 0-14-019292-1
Of Water and the Spirit: Ritual, Magic and Initiation in the Life of an African Shaman	Malidoma Some	1995	ISBN 0-14-019496-7
Buddhism Plain and Simple	Steve Hagen	1999	ISBN 0-14-019596-3
The Monks of War: The Military Religious Orders	Desmond Seward	1995	ISBN 978-0-14-019501-9
Medicine Woman	Lynn V. Andrews	1989	ISBN 0-14-019160-7
Jesus the Man	Kahlil Gibran	1997	ISBN 0-14-019546-7
Be as You Are: The Teachings of Sri Ramana Maharshi	Sri Maharshi, David Godman	1988	ISBN 0-14-019062-7
The Bhagavad Gita	Eknath Easwaran	1988	ISBN 0-14-019008-2
The Upanishads	Eknath Easwaran	1989	ISBN 0-14-019180-1
The Kabbalah Unveiled	Knorr Von Rosenroth, S.L. MacGregor Mathers	1992	ISBN 978-0-14-019310-7
From the Omens of Babylon: Astrology and Ancient Mesopotamia	Michael Baigent	1994	ISBN 0-14-019480-0
