= Xenophobia (disambiguation) =

Xenophobia is the fear of people who are different from one's self.

Xenophobia or Xenophobe may also refer to:

- Xenophobia (Why?), a 1988 rock album
- Xenophobe (video game), a 1987 video game
- Xenophobe (play-by-mail game)
- Xenophobe (EP), a 2015 metalcore song

== See also ==
- Xenophobe's Guides
