= Wippler =

Wippler is a surname. Notable people with the surname include:

- Harold Wippler (born c. 1928), Denver-based violinist
- Migene González-Wippler, Puerto Rican New Age author
