= Markides =

Markides (Greek: Μαρκίδες) or Markidis (Greek: Μαρκίδης) is a Greek surname that may refer to:

- Constantinos C. Markides (born 1960), Cypriot management educator and business theorist
- Kyriacos C. Markides (born 1942), American sociologist
- Markides Pouliou brothers, Aromanian typographers in Austria
