= Nicholas Mann =

Nicholas Mann may refer to:

- Nicholas Mann (occult writer) (born 1952), author of books on geomancy, mythology, etc.
- Nicholas Mann (antiquarian) (died 1753), English antiquary and Master of the Charterhouse
- Nicholas Mann (academic) (born 1942), scholar of Italian humanism
