= Edmund Brice =

English translator and schoolmaster

Edmund Brice (fl. 1648–1696) was an English translator and schoolmaster.

== Life ==
Brice, whose dates of birth and death are unknown, became a member of Jesus College, Oxford on or before 27 October 1648, matriculating on 12 March 1649 and obtaining his B.A. degree on 12 July 1650. He was then appointed a Fellow of All Souls College, Oxford, retaining his fellowship until about December 1660. It was reported that, during the time when he was a fellow of All Souls, he heard a sermon "preached in great Power" by John Pordage, rector of Bradfield, Berkshire. Brice and his companion went to discuss matters with Pordage, and joined his Behmenist group, although it is unclear how long he spent with the group.

He was licensed to instruct boys in the diocese of London in Latin grammar on 24 April 1669, having subscribed to the Thirty-Nine Articles. He also translated from the Latin Theodore Mundanus's response to Edmund Dickinson "concerning the Quintessence of the Philosophers" (1686). In 1696, another translation of his, Centrum Naturae Concentratum, or, The Salt of Nature Regenerated, was published. This was based on "The center of nature concentrated, or, Ali Puli his tractate of the regenerated salt of nature", ascribed to an "Asian moor" who had converted to Christianity called Ali Puli. A book by Jakob Böhme (Aurora, that is, the Day Spring (1656)), inscribed by Brice on the flyleaf, came to be owned by Caleb Gilman, a founder of the Philadelphian Society.
