= Xenophobe's Guides =

- Discipline: Non-fiction
- Publisher: Oval books

The Xenophobe's Guide books are a series of short books published by Oval Books that aim to give the reader the most important information about a country or region in a humorous way. They briefly describe its culture and history and something of the values held by its people under headings like "Business", "Language", etc.

== Reception ==
Jo Myers of the Evening Standard described the series as "quick to read, lighthearted and entertaining". In a review of the French guide, the English writer Lorna Sage called it "short, aphoristic, seriously funny, not that xenophobic and almost entirely apt".

The Scots guide, written by David Ross, was controversially received for its jokes about Scottish people, including one that alleged poor hygiene. Alex Salmond, then the leader of the Scottish National Party, criticised it as "a few gags short of the full joke", and historian Tom Devine found it too extreme. Others worried that the book would depict Scotland as an undesirable place. Ross defended the jokes and said that he was trying to "pinpoint what it is to be Scottish".

== Titles ==
- Xenophobe's Guide to the Albanians by Alan Andoni; first published 25 February 2015; ISBN 1-906042-18-7.
- Xenophobe's Guide to the Americans by Stephanie Faul; first published 1 March 1999; ISBN 1-902825-16-0.
- Xenophobe's Guide to the Aussies by Ken Hunt and Mike Taylor; first published 30 September 2004; ISBN 1-903096-86-3.
- Xenophobe's Guide to the Austrians by Louis James; first published 20 March 2000; ISBN 1-902825-18-7.
- Xenophobe's Guide to the Belgians by Antony Mason; first published 1 March 1999; ISBN 1-902825-19-5.
- Xenophobe's Guide to the Brazilians by Paulo Barauna; first published 26 July 2018; ISBN 978-1-906042-23-3.
- Xenophobe's Guide to the Californians by Anthony Marais; first published 20 June 2000; ISBN 1-902825-20-9.
- Xenophobe's Guide to the Canadians by Vaughn Roste; first published 31 October 2002; ISBN 1-902825-21-7.
- Xenophobe's Guide to the Chinese by J. C. Yang; first published 1 April 1999; ISBN 1-902825-22-5 .
- Xenophobe's Guide to the Czechs by Petr Berka, Ales Palan and Petr Stastny; first published 20 Feb 2008; ISBN 1-9028-2523-3.
- Xenophobe's Guide to the Danes by Helen Dyrbye, Steven Harris and Thomas Golzen; first published 1 March 1999; ISBN 1-902825-24-1.
- Xenophobe's Guide to the Dutch by Rodney Bolt; first published 1 March 1999; ISBN 1-902825-25-X.
- Xenophobe's Guide to the English by Antony Miall and David Milsted; first published 1 April 1999; ISBN 1-902825-26-8.
- Xenophobe's Guide to the Estonians by Hillary Bird, Lembit Öpik and Ulvi Mustmaa; first published 31 August 2010; ISBN 1-906042-30-6.
- Xenophobe's Guide to the Finns by Tarja Moles; first published 13 May 2011; ISBN 1-906042-31-4.
- Xenophobe's Guide to the French by Nick Yapp and Michel Syrett; first published 1 September 1999; ISBN 1-902825-28-4.
- The Frisians: A Xenophobe's Guide by Eric Hoekstra; first published 19 October 2017; ISBN 1-906042-52-7.
- Xenophobe's Guide to the Germans by Stefan Zeidenitz and Ben Barkow; first published 1 November 1999; ISBN 1-902825-29-2.
- Xenophobe's Guide to the Greeks by Alexandra Fiada; first published 30 September 2003; ISBN 1-903096-32-4.
- Xenophobe's Guide to the Hungarians by Miklós Vámos and Mátyás Sárközi; first published 1 April 1999; ISBN 1-902825-31-4.
- Xenophobe's Guide to the Icelanders by Richard Sale; first published 20 June 2000; ISBN 1-902825-32-2.
- Xenophobe's Guide to the Irish by Frank McNally; first published 29 April 2005; ISBN 1-902825-33-0.
- Xenophobe's Guide to the Israelis by Aviv Ben Zeev; first publishes 31 July 2001; ISBN 1-902825-34-9.
- Xenophobe's Guide to the Italians by Martin Solly; first published 1 March 1999; ISBN 1-902825-35-7.
- Xenophobe's Guide to the Japanese by Sahoko Kaji, Noriko Hama and Jonathan Rice; first published 1 August 1999; ISBN 1-902825-36-5.
- Xenophobe's Guide to the Kiwis by Christine Cole Catley & Simon Nicholson, first published 1 March 2005; ISBN 1-903096-87-1.
- Xenophobe's Guide to the Norwegians by Dan Elloway, first published 3 July 2015; ISBN 1-906042-43-8.
- Xenophobe's Guide to the Poles by Ewa Lipniacka; first published 1 June 2000; ISBN 1-902825-40-3.
- Xenophobe's Guide to the Portuguese by Matthew Hancock; first published 30 May 2012; ISBN 1-903096-84-7.
- Xenophobe's Guide to the Russians by Vladimir Zhelvis; first published 31 July 2001; ISBN 1-902825-41-1.
  - First for Ravette Books as Xenophobe's Guide to the Russians by Elizabeth Roberts; first published 1 January 2000; ISBN 1-85304-737-6.
- Xenophobe's Guide to the Scots by David Ross, first published 1 October 1999; ISBN 1-902825-42-X.
- Xenophobe's Guide to the Spanish by Drew Launay; first published 1 March 1999; ISBN 1-902825-43-8.
- Xenophobe's Guide to the Swedes by Peter Berlin; first published 1 March 1999; ISBN 1-902825-44-6.
- Xenophobe's Guide to the Swiss by Paul Bilton; first published 1 March 1999; ISBN 1-902825-45-4.
- Xenophobe's Guide to the Welsh by John Winterson Richards; first published 1 April 1999; ISBN 1-902825-46-2.

== Lingo Learners ==
Xenophobe also publishes a language learning book series under the name Xenophobe's Lingo Learners. The current editions include:

- French for Xenophobes by Drew Launay; first published 30 July 2003; ISBN 1-903096-14-6.
- German for Xenophobes by Drew Launay; first published March 2006; ISBN 1-903096-15-4.
- Greek for Xenophobes by Alexandra Fiada; first published July 2006; ISBN 978-1903096277.
- Italian for Xenophobes by Drew Launay; first published March 2006; ISBN 1-903096-18-9.
- Spanish for Xenophobes by Drew Launay; first published 30 July 2003; ISBN 1-903096-19-7.
