= André Launay =

André Joseph Launay was a novelist, essayist, humourist and dramatist of French descent who wrote in English under the pen names André Launay, Drew Launay, Andrew Laurance and Drew Lamark.

He was the author of family dramas, psychic thrillers, humour and travel books published in the United Kingdom and in the US. Launay lived in Nerja, in the south of Spain until his death; He had three children: record producer Nick Launay, film director Matthew Launay, artist and illustrator Melissa Launay, and four grandchildren; Lee, Lana, Nicolas & Samuel.

== Fiction ==
- The New Shining White Murder
- A Corpse in Camera
- Death and Still Life
- The Scream
- The Premonition
- The Link
- The Unborn
- Catacomb
- Ouija
- The Black Hotel
- The Girl with a Peppermint Taste
- The Innocence Has Gone, Daddy
- The Snake Orchards
- The Medusa Horror
- The Latchkey Children (hard & paperback)
- The Harlequin’s Son (hard & paperback)
- Seance
- She Modelled Her Coffin (Linford Mystery Library)
- The Two-Way Mirror
- The Olive Groves of Alhora (with Maria Isabel Rodriguez)
- The Maestro of Alhora (with Maria Isabel Rodriguez)

== Non-fiction ==
- Caviare and After
- Dictionary of Contemporaries
- Historic Air Disasters
- Eat, Drink and Be Sorry
- Morocco
- Madrid & Southern Spain
- The Other You
- Bluffers Guide to Antiques (paperback)
- The Xenophobe's Guide to the Spanish (Paperback)

== Xenophobe's Guides ==
- French for Xenophobes: Xenophobe's Lingo Learners (paperback)
- Spanish for Xenophobes: Xenophobe's Lingo Learners (paperback)
- German for Xenophobes: Xenophobe's Lingo Learners (paperback)
- Italian for Xenophobes: Xenophobe's Lingo Learners (paperback)

== Stage plays ==
- The Man on a Balcony
- The Aimless
- Come Into My Bed
- Yes, We Have no Pyjamas
- A Farce in his Ear, (with Anthony Marriott)

== Screenplays ==
- The Girl With a Peppermint Taste (for Carter DeHaven)
- Hideous Whispers (for Hammer)
- Black Hotel (for Hammer)
- The Latchkey Children (for Joe Manuel Productions)
- The Harlequin's Son (for Rocket Pictures)

== Radio broadcasts ==
- Siesta Days, Fiesta Nights. BBC Radio Four.

== Television ==
- The Man on a Balcony
- If the Crown Fits series with Robert Morley.

== Documentary Film ==
- The Chef of the Dorchester (Look at Life.)
