= Robert John Stewart =

Scottish composer, writer and teacher

R J (Bob) Stewart
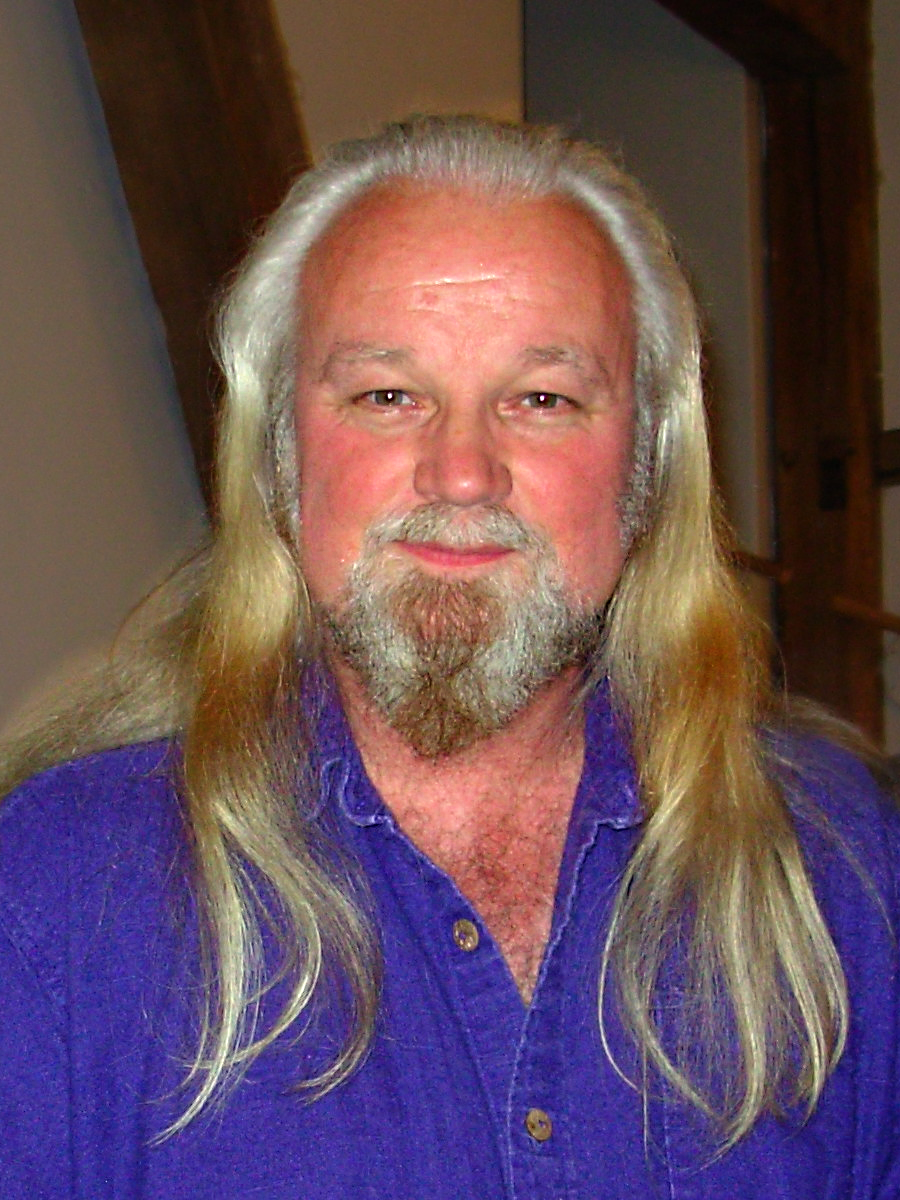
- Author, composer and teacher R.J. Stewart

Background information
- Born: Robert John Stewart; 1949 (age 76–77)
- Genres: Scottish music
- Occupations: composer, author, teacher
- Instruments: psaltery, cittern, guitar, autoharp
- Website: www.rjstewart.net

Robert John "R J" Stewart (born 1949) is a Scottish-born composer, author, and teacher. He has written over 40 books on occultism, Ceremonial magic and Celtic mythology. His books include a series on the underworld and faery traditions.

From 1980 to 1988, Stewart wrote two books about Merlin, translating and exploring medieval texts on the topic (now published in one volume as Merlin: the Prophetic Vision and Mystic Life, by Penguin Arkana). He also created the Merlin Tarot, (HarperCollins) comprising a book and a deck of cards (painted by Miranda Gray) depicting scenes from ancient Merlin texts. This deck and book have been translated into Japanese, French, Italian, and German.

From 1988 to the present, R J Stewart has taught workshops and classes on Celtic and Classical mythological traditions, music and consciousness. In 1993, he co-wrote Celtic Bards, Celtic Druids, (Published by Cassell, Blandford Press) with harper and storyteller Robin Williamson, founder of The Incredible String Band. R J Stewart teaches the Faery (Fairy) Tradition which he has explored in the books: Living World of Faery, Earthlight, Power within the Land and the Well of Light. This later book has great relevance for the increasingly important practice of "Earth Healing" which has great relevance in our modern-day crisis. As folk musician “Bob Stewart”, he made famous a folk instrument of his own design referred to on his albums as a ‘concert psaltery’. The instrument is similar to a zither, and has groups of strings laid out left to right, in triad chord groups rather than as chromatic scales. Although this can make the instrument difficult to play at speed, complex chord progressions can be easily interwoven around a basic melody.

== Discography ==
- Bob Stewart – The Wraggle Taggle Gypsies O
- The Journey to the Underworld
- The Unique Sound of the Psaltery
- Advanced Magical Arts
- Calling in the Elements

== Bibliography ==
- The Way of Merlin
- The Miracle Tree
- Living Magical Arts
- Advanced Magical Arts
- The Underworld Initiation
- The Living World of Faery
- Power within the Land
- Earth Light
- The Spiritual Dimensions of Music
- Celebrating the Male Mysteries
- Celtic Gods, Celtic Goddesses
- Walker Between Worlds
