= Baba Raúl Cañizares =

Cuban priest

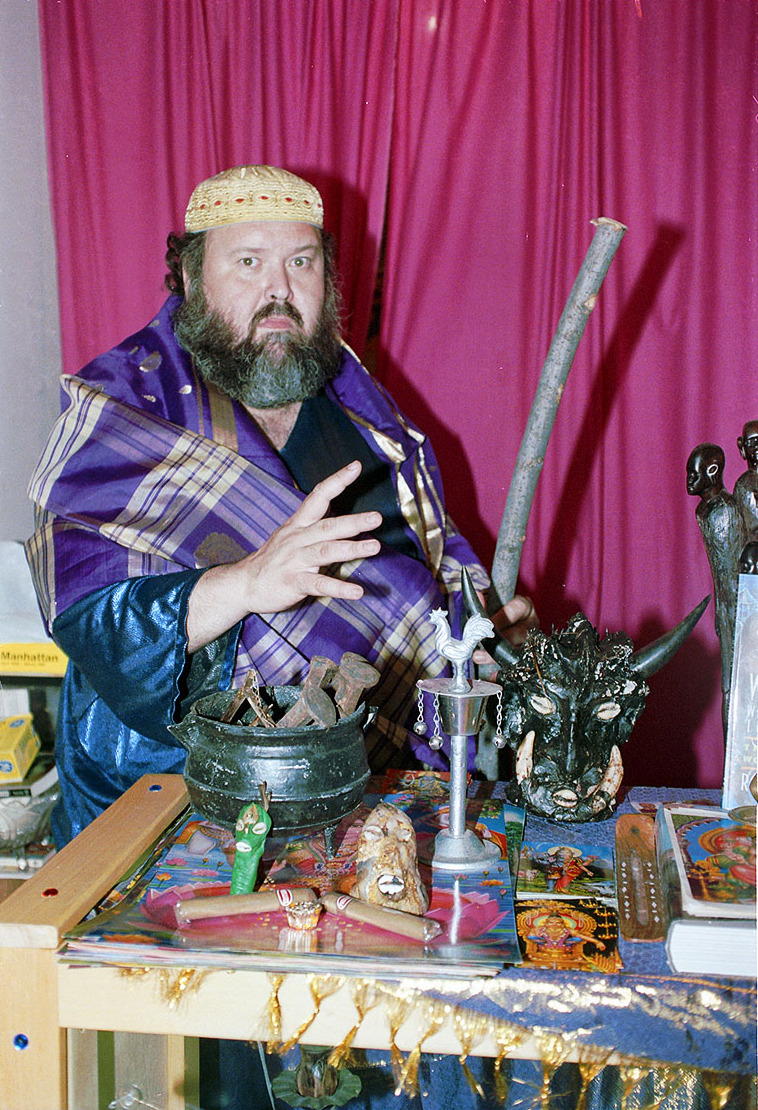
Baba Raúl Cañizares

Baba Raul Canizares (24 September 1955 – 28 December 2002) was a Cuban Oba, a Santerían priest, an author, an artist, a musician, and a professor of religion who founded the Orisha Consciousness Movement.

== Bibliography ==
- 1999 - Cuban Santería: Walking With the Night (Ten Speed; Updated edition) ISBN 0-89281-762-3
- 2000 - Shango : Santería and the Orisha of Thunder (Original Publications) ISBN 0-942272-60-9
- 2000 - Obatala: Santería and the White Robed King of the Orisha (Original Publications) ISBN 0-942272-63-3
- 2001 - The Life and Works of Marie LaVeau (Original Publications) ISBN 0-942272-71-4
- 2001 - Eshu-Eleggua Elegbara: Santería and the Orisha of the Crossroads (Original Publications) ISBN 0-942272-61-7
- 2002 - The Book on Palo (Original Publications) ISBN 0-942272-66-8
- 2002 - Oshún: Santería and Orisha of Love, Rivers & Sensuality (Original Publications) ISBN 0-942272-69-2

== Discography ==
- 2004 - Sacred Sounds of Santería: Rhythms of the Orishas - Music CD (Destiny Recordings; Abridged edition) ISBN 1-59477-002-6
- Sacred Sounds of Santería: Rhythms of the Orishas (Destiny Recordings) ISBN 0-89281-407-1 (Cassette)
- 2005 - Sacred Sounds of the Female Orishas: Rhythms of the Goddess (Destiny Recordings) - Music CD ISBN 1-59477-071-9
- Cuban Trance - Music CD

== Obituary ==
- Dedication in Ashe Journal
