= Sacred geometry =

Symbolic and sacred meanings ascribed to certain geometric shapes

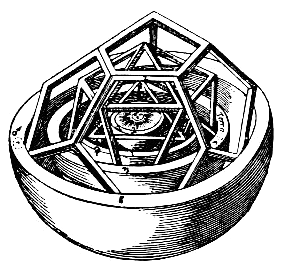
Inner section of Kepler's Platonic solid model of planetary spacing in the Solar System from Mysterium Cosmographicum (1596)

Sacred geometry ascribes symbolic and sacred meanings to certain geometric shapes and certain geometric proportions. It is associated with the belief of a divine creator of the universal geometer. The geometry used in the design and construction of religious structures such as churches, temples, mosques, religious monuments, altars, and tabernacles has sometimes been considered sacred. The concept applies also to sacred spaces such as temenoi, sacred groves, village greens, pagodas and holy wells, Mandala Gardens and the creation of religious and spiritual art.

== As worldview and cosmology ==
The belief that a god created the universe according to a geometric plan has ancient origins. Plutarch attributed the belief to Plato, writing that "Plato said God geometrizes continually" (Convivialium disputationum, liber 8,2). In modern times, the mathematician Carl Friedrich Gauss adapted this quote, saying "God arithmetizes".

Johannes Kepler (1571–1630) believed in the geometric underpinnings of the cosmos.

== Natural forms ==
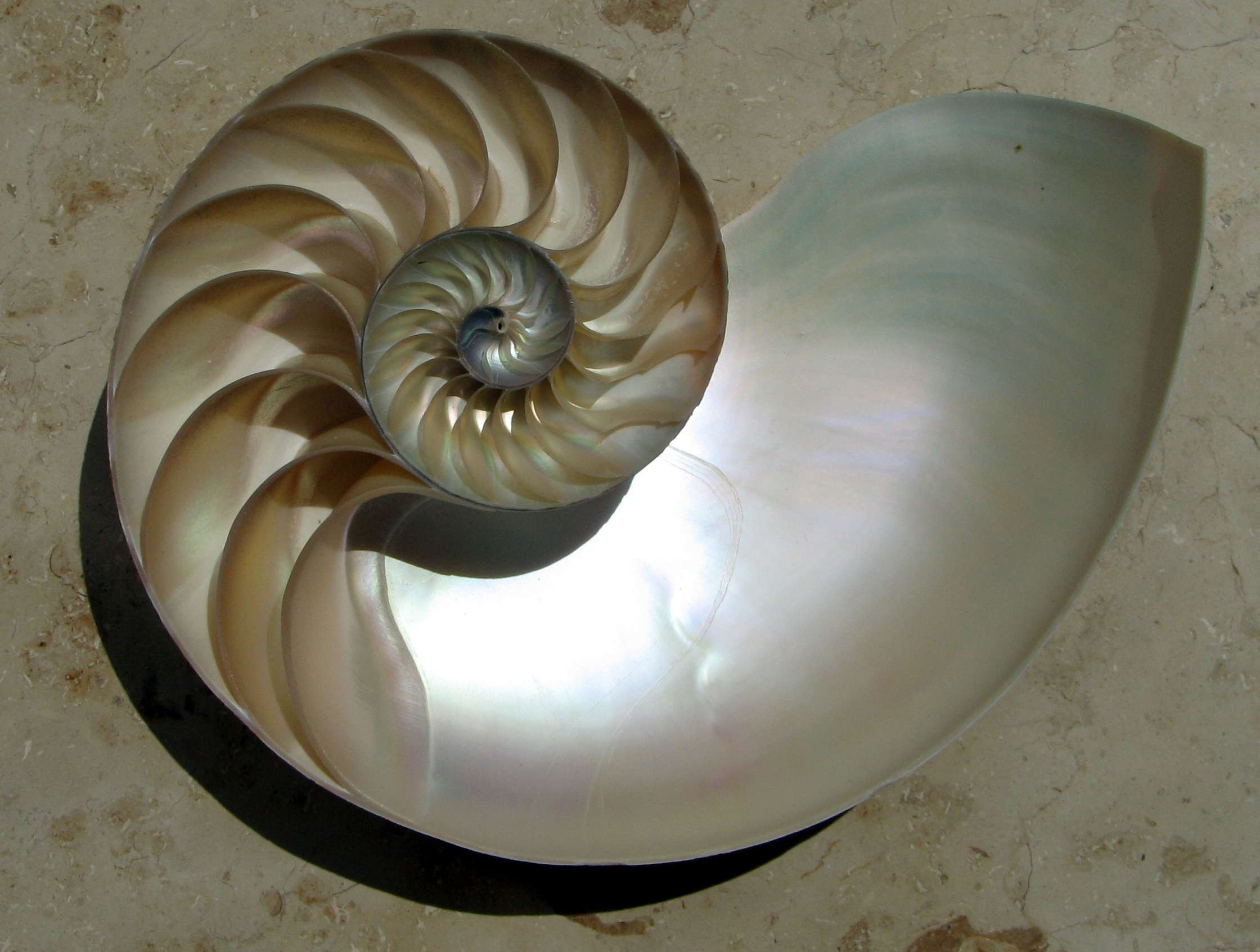
Nautilus shell's logarithmic growth spiral

According to Stephen Skinner, the study of sacred geometry has its roots in the study of nature, and the mathematical principles at work therein.

== Representations in art and architecture ==
=== In Christianity ===
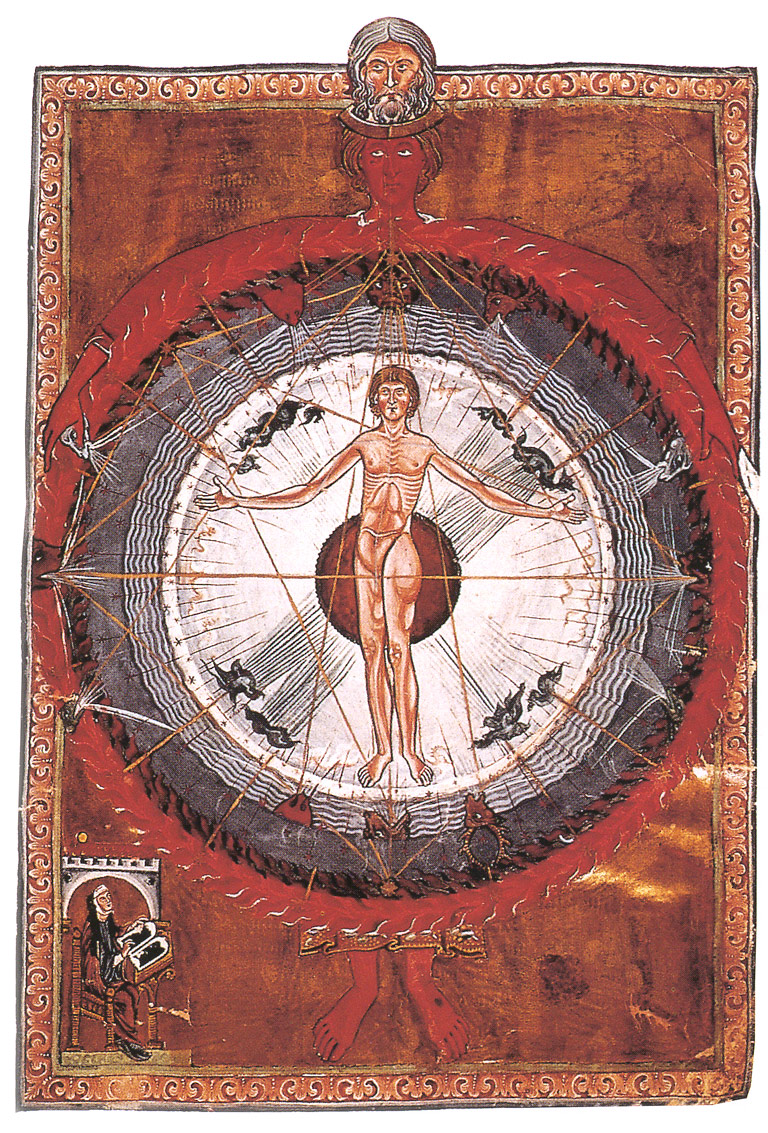
Microcosmic Man as described by Hildegard of Bingen

The construction of Medieval European cathedrals was often based on geometries intended to make the viewer see the world through mathematics, and through this understanding, gain a better understanding of the divine. These churches frequently featured a Latin Cross floor-plan.

In the High Middle Ages, leading Christian philosophers explained the layout of the universe in terms of a microcosm analogy. In her book describing the divine visions she witnessed, Hildegard of Bingen explains that she saw an outstretched human figure located within a circular orb. When interpreted by theologians, the human figure was Christ and mankind showing the Earthly realm and the circumference of the circle was a representation of the universe. Some images also show above the universe a depiction of God. This is thought to later have inspired Da Vinci's Vitruvian Man.

Dante uses circles to make up the nine layers of hell categorized in his book, The Divine Comedy. "Celestial spheres" are also utilized to make up the nine layers of Paradise. He further creates a cosmic order of circular forms that stretches from Jerusalem in the Earthly realm up to God in Heaven. This cosmology is believed to have been inspired by the ancient astronomer Ptolemy.

At the beginning of the Renaissance in Europe, views shifted to favor simple and regular geometries. The circle in particular became a central and symbolic shape for the base of buildings, as it represented the perfection of nature and the centrality of man's place in the universe. The use of the circle and other simple and symmetrical geometric shapes was solidified as a staple of Renaissance sacred architecture in Leon Battista Alberti's architectural treatise, which described the ideal church in terms of spiritual geometry.

=== In Buddhism ===
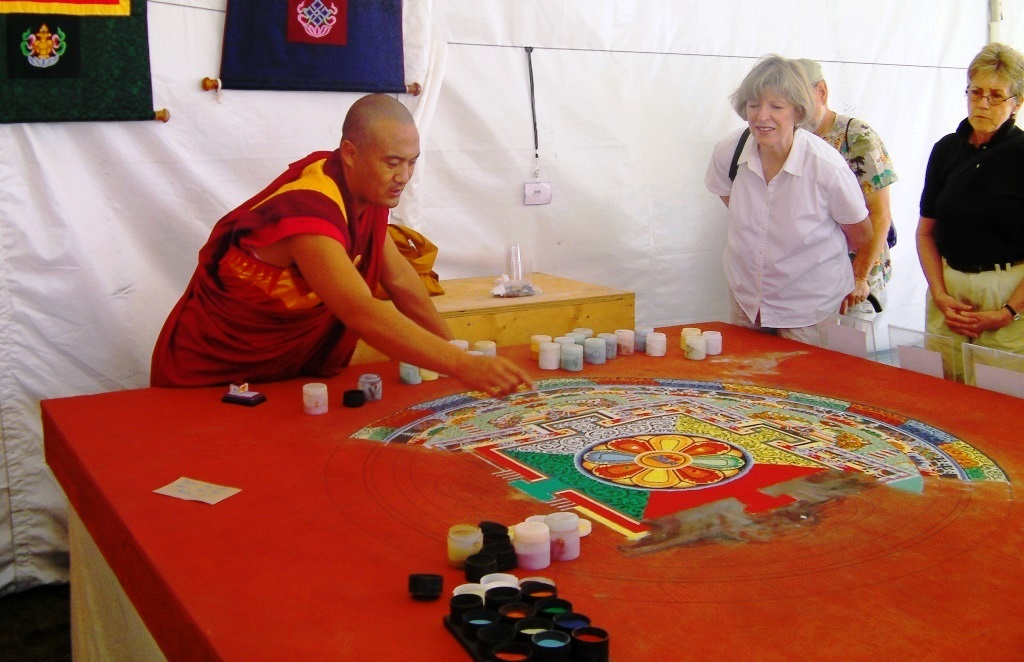
Tibetan Buddhist Sand Mandala

Mandalas are made up of a compilation of geometric shapes. In Buddhism, it is made up of concentric circles and squares that are equally placed from the center. Located within the geometric configurations are deities or suggestions of the deity, such as in the form of a symbol. This is because Buddhists believe that deities can actually manifest inside the mandala. Mandalas can be created with a variety of mediums. Tibetan Buddhists create mandalas out of sand that are then ritually destroyed. In order to create the mandala, two lines are first drawn on a predetermined grid. The lines, known as Brahman lines, must overlap at the precisely calculated center of the grid. The mandala is then divided into thirteen equal parts not by a mathematical calculation, but through trial and error. Next, monks purify the grid to prepare it for the constructing of the deities before sand is finally added. Tibetan Buddhists believe that anyone who looks at the mandala will receive positive energy and be blessed. Due to the Buddhist belief in impermanence, the mandala is eventually dismantled and is ritualistically released into the world.

=== In Chinese spiritual traditions ===
One of the cornerstones of Chinese folk religion is the relationship between man and nature. This is epitomized in feng shui, which are architectural principles outlining the design plans of buildings in order to optimize the harmony of man and nature through the movement of Chi, or "life-generating energy." In order to maximize the flow of Chi throughout a building, its design plan must utilize specific shapes. Rectangles and squares are considered to be the best shapes to use in feng shui design. This is because other shapes may obstruct the flow of Chi from one room to the next due to what are considered to be unnatural angles. Room layout is also an important element, as doors should be proportional to one another and located at appropriate positions throughout the house. Typically, doors are not situated across from one another because it may cause Chi to flow too fast from one room to the next.

The Forbidden City is an example of a building that uses sacred geometry through the principles of feng shui in its design plan. It is laid out in the shape of a rectangle that measures over half a mile long and about half a mile wide. Furthermore, the Forbidden City constructed its most important buildings on a central axis. The Hall of Supreme Harmony, which was the Emperor's throne room, is located at the midpoint or "epicenter" of the central axis. This was done intentionally, as it was meant to show that when the Emperor entered this room, he would be ceremonially transformed into the center of the universe.

=== In Hinduism/Indic Religion ===
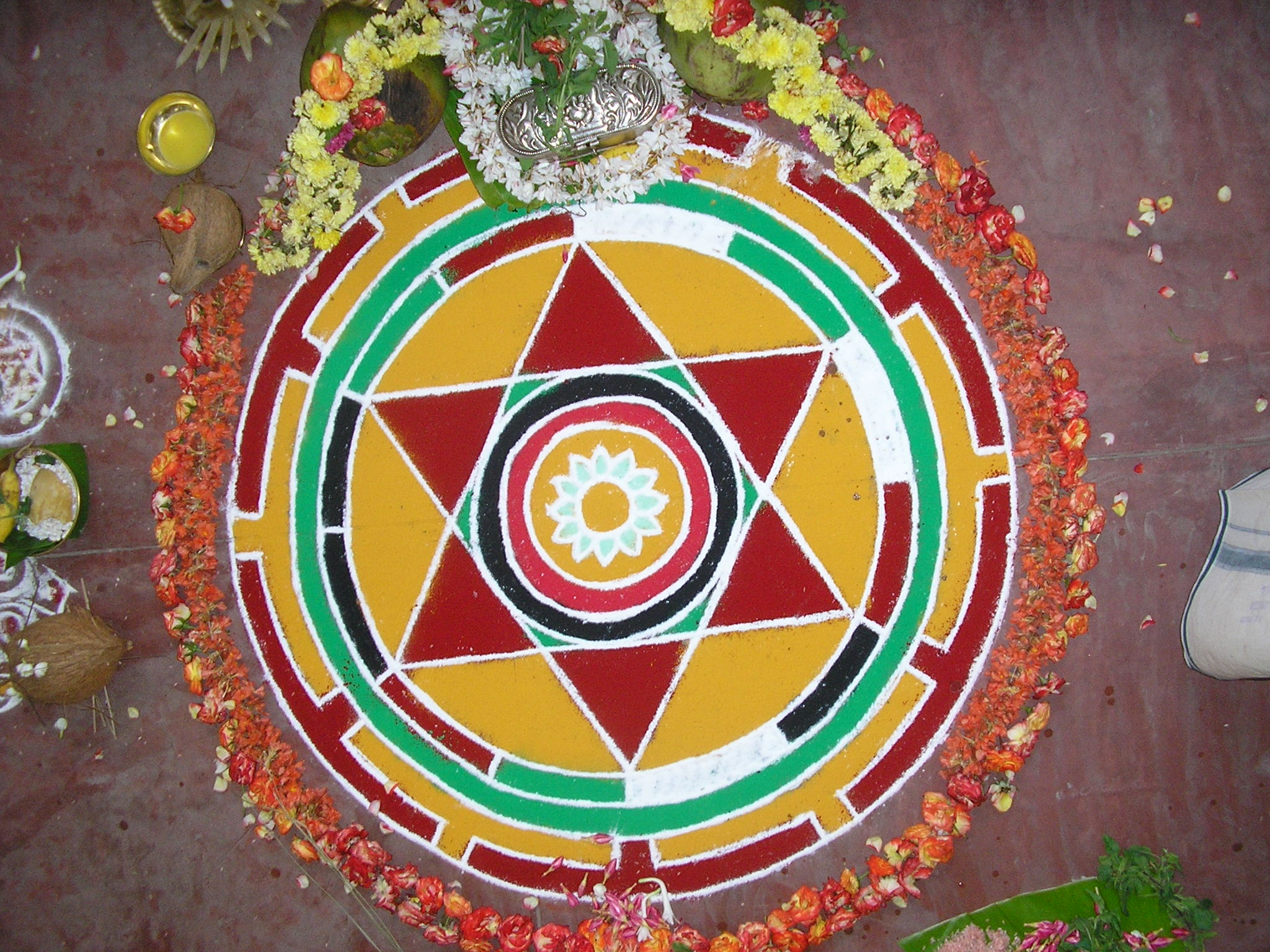
A Hindu Maṇḍala

The Agamas are a collection of Sanskrit, Tamil, and Grantha scriptures chiefly constituting the methods of temple construction and creation of idols, worship means of deities, philosophical doctrines, meditative practices, attainment of sixfold desires, and four kinds of yoga.

==== Hindu temples ====
The symbolic representation of the cosmic model is then projected onto Hindu temples using the Vastu Shastra principle of Sukha Darshan, which states that smaller parts of the temple should be self-similar and a replica of the whole. The repetition of these replication parts symbolizes the natural phenomena of fractal patterns found in nature. These patterns make up the exterior of Hindu temples. Each element and detail are proportional to each other, this occurrence is also known as the sacred geometry.

== Unanchored geometry ==
Stephen Skinner criticizes the tendency of some writers to place a geometric diagram over virtually any image of a natural object or human created structure, find some lines intersecting the image and declare it based on sacred geometry. If the geometric diagram does not intersect major physical points in the image, the result is what Skinner calls "unanchored geometry".

== Notable artists ==
- Hildegard of Bingen
- Hilma af Klint
- Olga Fröbe-Kapteyn
- Carl Jung

== See also ==
- Circle dance
- Golden Ratio
- Ley line
- Lu Ban and Feng shui
- Magic circle
- Harmony of the spheres
- Numerology
- Shield of the Trinity
- Yantra
- 108 (number)
