= Torkom Saraydarian =

American writer and musician (1917–1997)

- Born: November 1, 1917; Sevas, Turkey
- Died: January - 1997; Sedona, Arizona
- Occupations: Writer, spiritual teacher, musician
- Known for: Researching and teaching the Ageless Wisdom, authoring over 150 books

Torkom Saraydarian (1917–1997) was an American writer, poet, and musician. He was born in Sevas, Turkey to Armenian parents. He was trained in "The Ageless Wisdom Teachings" under the guidance of his father.

He visited monasteries, temples and mystery schools seeking answers to his questions about the mystery of man and the universe. He was musically trained and played the violin, piano, oud, cello and guitar. Saraydarian composed hundreds of musical pieces.

His work intends to represent a synthesis of sacred culture of the world by creating a truly universal approach to spirituality. His work spans over books (published and unpublished), musical pieces, and lectures.

== Early life ==
At age nine, Saraydarian began to receive education in the Ageless Wisdom under his father's guidance. At that time, people attended meetings — in caves or outside — to hold ceremonies and dramatizations to reveal the world's mysteries.

== United States ==
In 1959, he moved to the US with his family from Jordan. He began inviting people into his home in Van Nuys, California to learn how to live more productive, healthy, right lives via the principles of Ageless Wisdom. This was the inception of the Aquarian Educational Group (AEG). At AEG's 35th anniversary celebration in Agoura, California he stated:

Now, how we started this group. This group was started in 1961 — unofficially. One day I was coming home from the church. I saw 15 boys sitting and doping themselves. All my neighbors — very beautiful boys and girls. When I saw them doping and smoking, my heart broke. I said, 'Don't they have fathers, don't they have mothers?' Because I was from the old country and could not understand America. (That was not America, but I say 'America'.) I couldn't understand how people could drug themselves and dope themselves. So I went home, I meditated, I thought. I said, "We must form a group to bring all these children in and slowly educate them."

For ten years, he taught classes and lectured in a one-room garage without a salary except for small donations left by students.

== Teachings ==
Torkom Saraydarian's seven principles of right living are Beauty, Goodness, Righteousness, Joy, Freedom, Striving and Sacrificial Service.

We are an international group in which everyone can take part because it is the principles that give life — not religions.

We didn't build a religion. We didn't build hatred between people. We emphasized great principles and these great principles worked.

Through the practice of these principles, Torkom aimed to teach people how to be successful, co-operative, creative and have healthy, happy relationships.

== Legacy ==
Torkom taught for over 50 years in the US and internationally, and counseled thousands of people. He collected over 8,000 books, booklets, and periodicals and therewith formed the TS library. He presented thousands of lectures, seminars, and workshops in the US and internationally.

He wrote 170 books, of which some have been translated into Spanish, Portuguese, Italian, Greek, Armenian, Danish, Swedish, German, Yugoslavian, and Russian, as well as thousands of articles. He studied and wrote summaries of major books of the Wisdom Teachings, including The Secret Doctrine, The Bhagavad Gita, Treatise on Cosmic Fire, and the Agni Yoga Books. With his daughter, Gita Saraydarian, Torkom helped create the TSG Foundation as the major publishing house for his works.

He also created The Creative Trust with Gita to house his creative works and created meditation courses and spiritual training curricula. TSG University curriculum was founded to promote his work.

== Publications ==
- The Ageless Wisdom
- Ashrams
- Aura, Shield of Protection and Glory
- Avatars, Revelations of God
- Battling Dark Forces
- Bhagavad Gita
- Breakthrough to Higher Psychism
- Buddha Sutra - A Dialogue with the Glorious One
- Challenge for Discipleship
- Christ, The Avatar of Sacrificial Love
- Commentary on Psychic Energy
- Cosmic Shocks
- Cosmos in Man
- Creative Fire
- Creative Sound, Sacred Music, Dance, and Song
- Dialogue with Christ (2nd Ed.)
- Dynamics of the Soul
- Dynamics of Success
- Education as Transformation, Vol. I
- Education as Transformation, Vol. II
- Eyes of Hierarchy
- Flame of Beauty, Culture, Love, Joy
- Flame of the Heart
- From My Heart - Collection of Poetry, Vol. I
- Glossary - A Concordance of Torkom Saraydarian's Works
- Hiawatha and the Great Peace
- Hidden Glory of the Inner Man
- Initiation, The Path of Living Service
- I Was (The Journey of a Wise Woman)
- Joy and Healing (3rd Ed.)
- Karma and Reincarnation
- Leadership, Vol. I
- Leadership, Vol. II
- Leadership, Vol. III
- Leadership, Vol. IV
- Leadership, Vol. V
- Legend of Shamballa
- Mysteries of Willpower
- Mystery of Self-Image
- New Dimensions in Healing
- Obsession and Possession
- Olympus World Report - The Year 3000
- One Hundred Names of God
- Other Worlds
- Psyche and Psychism (2 Volume Set)
- Psychology of Cooperation and Group Consciousness
- Purpose of Life
- Science of Becoming Oneself
- Science of Meditation
- Sense of Responsibility in Society
- Sex, Family, and the Woman in Society (2nd Ed.)
- Solar Angel, Vol. 1
- Solar Angel, Vol. 2
- Spiritual Regeneration
- Spring of Prosperity
- Symphony of the Zodiac
- Talks on Agni, Vol. I
- Talks on Agni, Vol. II
- Talks on Agni, Vol. III
- Teaching the Ageless Wisdom
- The Chalice in Agni Yoga
- The Subconscious Mind and The Chalice
- Thought & The Glory of Thinking
- Transformation
- Triangles of Fire
- Unusual Court
- Woman Torch of the Future (2nd Ed.)
- Wisdom of the Zodiac Volume 1: Aries-Taurus-Gemini
- Wisdom of the Zodiac Volume 2: Cancer-Leo-Virgo
- Wisdom of the Zodiac Volume 3: Libra-Scorpio-Sagittarius
- Wisdom of the Zodiac Volume 4: Capricorn-Aquarius-Pisces
- The Year 2000 & After

== Music ==
Torkom composed and recorded hundreds of musical compositions and sacred songs.

- Dance of The Zodiac
- Misty Mountain
- Far Horizons
- Piano Compositions
- Fire Blossom
- Rainbow
- Infinity
- Sacred Songs
- Lao Tse
- Spirit of My Heart
- Let My Dreams Come True
- Sun Rhythms
- Tears of My Joy
- Light Years Ahead
- A Touch of Heart
- Lily in Tibet
- Toward Freedom
