= Ann Moura =

American writer

Ann Moura (born August 20 1947) is an author of books about magic, religion and Neo-Paganism. She calls her witchcraft tradition Green Witchcraft, and has written several books about it. Her public Craft name is Aoumiel.

Ann Moura has been a solitary practitioner of Green Witchcraft for over forty-five years. According to Moura, her mother and grandmother practiced witchcraft, which makes her a hereditary witch. Her mother and grandmother were Brazilians of Spanish descent, and Ann Moura considers their tradition Celtic-Iberian. Unlike them, Moura doesn't include names of Christian saints to her witchcraft practice. Instead, she uses names of Pagan deities because she believes that the family's witchcraft tradition was originally Pagan.

The death of Moura's mother prompted her to write about Green Witchcraft. She wanted to pass along the things she had learned from her mother and grandmother. Her mother and grandmother passed down information as matters came up rather than as a complete, formal education. Moura was worried that the knowledge moving from one generation to the next was getting slimmer. Green Witchcraft as presented by Moura also contains information discovered by Moura herself.

Moura holds both Bachelor of Arts and Master of Arts degrees in history. She is a certified Archivist, and has been a Navy Lieutenant and a high school history teacher. She runs her own metaphysical store. She is married, and has two children. She lives in Florida.

== Bibliography ==
Books about Green Witchcraft

- Green Witchcraft: Folk Magic, Fairy Lore & Herb Craft (1996) Llewellyn Publications ISBN 978-1-56718-690-1, ISBN 1-56718-690-4
  - translated in German as Naturmagie: Die Grüne Hexenkunst Silberschnur ISBN 3-89845-091-0, ISBN 978-3-89845-091-1
  - translated in Italian as Stregoneria verde: Magia popolare, tradizioni fatate e l'arte delle erbe Elfi ISBN 88-89296-00-3, ISBN 978-88-89296-00-4
- Green Witchcraft II: Balancing Light & Shadow (1999) Llewellyn Publications ISBN 978-1-56718-689-5, ISBN 1-56718-689-0
  - translated in Italian as Stregoneria verde 2: L'equilibrio tra luce ed ombra Elfi ISBN 88-89296-08-9, ISBN 978-88-89296-08-0
- Green Witchcraft III: The Manual (2000) Llewellyn Publications ISBN 978-1-56718-688-8, ISBN 1-56718-688-2
- Green Magic: The Sacred Connection to Nature (2002) Llewellyn Publications ISBN 978-0-7387-0181-3, ISBN 0-7387-0181-5
- Grimoire for the Green Witch: A Complete Book of Shadows (2003) Llewellyn Publications ISBN 978-0-7387-0287-2, ISBN 0-7387-0287-0
- Tarot for the Green Witch (2003) Llewellyn Publications ISBN 978-0-7387-0288-9, ISBN 0-7387-0288-9
- Mansions of the Moon for the Green Witch: A Complete Book of Lunar Magic (2010) Llewellyn Publications ISBN 978-0-7387-2065-4, ISBN 0-7387-2065-8

Other books

- Dancing Shadows: The Roots of Western Religious Beliefs (1995) Llewellyn Publications ISBN 978-1-56718-691-8, ISBN 1-56718-691-2
- Origins Of Modern Witchcraft: The Evolution of a World Religion (2000) Llewellyn Publications ISBN 978-1-56718-648-2, ISBN 1-56718-648-3
- Witchcraft: An Alternative Path (2003) Llewellyn Publications ISBN 978-0-7387-0343-5, ISBN 0-7387-0343-5
  - translated in French as Sorcellerie : Une voie alternative ISBN 2-89565-126-4, ISBN 978-2-89565-126-0
- Ann Moura's New History of Witchcraft (2007) 7th House ISBN 978-1-933320-19-9, ISBN 1-933320-19-2
