= Francis X. King =

British occult writer (1934–1994)

- Born: George Francis King; January 10, 1934
- Died: November 8, 1994 (aged 60)
- Occupation: Writer
- Writing career
- Genre: Non-fiction
- Subject: Occult

George Francis King (10 January 1934 – 8 November 1994), known as Francis X. King, was a British occult writer and editor from London who wrote about tarot, divination, witchcraft, magic, sex magic, tantra, and holistic medicine. He was a member of the Society of the Inner Light, an offshoot of the Alpha et Omega, which in turn was an offshoot of the Hermetic Order of the Golden Dawn.

== Controversies ==
King's 1973 publication of The Secret Rituals of the O.T.O. infuriated their order head Grady McMurtry, because the fraternity's secrets were being revealed in 1820. In an O.T.O newsletter, McMurtry stated their policy at the time: "We do not endorse the publication of this material because the so called 9th degree section does not include the paper (titled IX degree Emblems and Modes of Use) which Aleister Crowley handed me at 93 Jermyn St circa 1943-44 e.v. without which the whole thing is nonsense." Francis King is thought to have been given the rest of the rituals (sans the missing one) by Gerald Yorke.

Around the same time, King began to establish a new occult order. Members would begin by participating in a correspondence course before passing to a physical lodge, which King made equipment for and opened with the help of occultist friends. However, the Golden Dawn temple which King claimed his new Order had lineage from, the Hermanubis in Bristol, was made up by King, as were many of the teachings he claimed were in documents passed onto him. This deception found its way into works by Ithell Colquhoun and the Hermetic Tablet journal, complicating accurate histories and teachings of the Golden Dawn and Stella Matutina. King never progressed any students to the physical lodge and later claimed that whilst the Hermanubis temple had existed, it did not have a legitimate lineage.

== Selected publications ==
- Ritual Magic in England (1887 to the Present Day) (1970) (see also 1989)
  - The Rites of Modern Occult Magic (American edition, 1971)
- Sexuality, Magic and Perversion (1971)
- Astral Projection, Ritual Magic and Alchemy (1972)
- The Secret Rituals of the O.T.O. (1973)
- Crowley on Christ (1974)
- Magic: The Western Tradition (1975)
- Satan and Swastika (1976)
- Techniques of High Magic, with Stephen Skinner (1976)
- The Magical World of Aleister Crowley (1977)
- Tantra: A Practical Guide to its Teachings and Techniques
- The Cosmic Influence (1976)
- The Rebirth of Magic (1982)
- The Unexplained File Cult And Occult (1985) Orbis Publishing ISBN 978-0-85613-810-2
- Tantra For Westerners: A Practical Guide to the Way of Action (1986)
- Rudolf Steiner and Holistic Medicine (1987)
- The Encyclopedia of Fortune-Telling (1988)
- Modern Ritual Magic: the rise of western occultism. Bridport: Prism, 1989 ISBN 1853270326 (previous ed. Ritual Magic in England, 1970)
- Tarot (1990)
- Witchcraft and Demonology (1991)
- Mind & Magic - An Illustrated Encyclopedia of the Mysterious and Unexplained (1991)
- The Flying Sorcerer: Being the Magical and Aeronautical Adventures of Francis Barrett (1992)
- Nostradamus: Prophecies Fulfilled and Predictions for the Millennium and Beyond by Francis X. King (1993) With Stephen Skinner
- The Complete Fortune-Teller with Paul Cooper (1994)
- Encyclopedia of Mind, Magic, and Mysteries (1995)
- The Hamlyn Encyclopedia of Fortune-Telling: Predict the Future and Plan Your Life with This Practical Guide to Techniques (1997)
- The Illustrated Encyclopedia of Fortune-Telling (2001)
