= Francis Barrett (occultist) =

English occultist

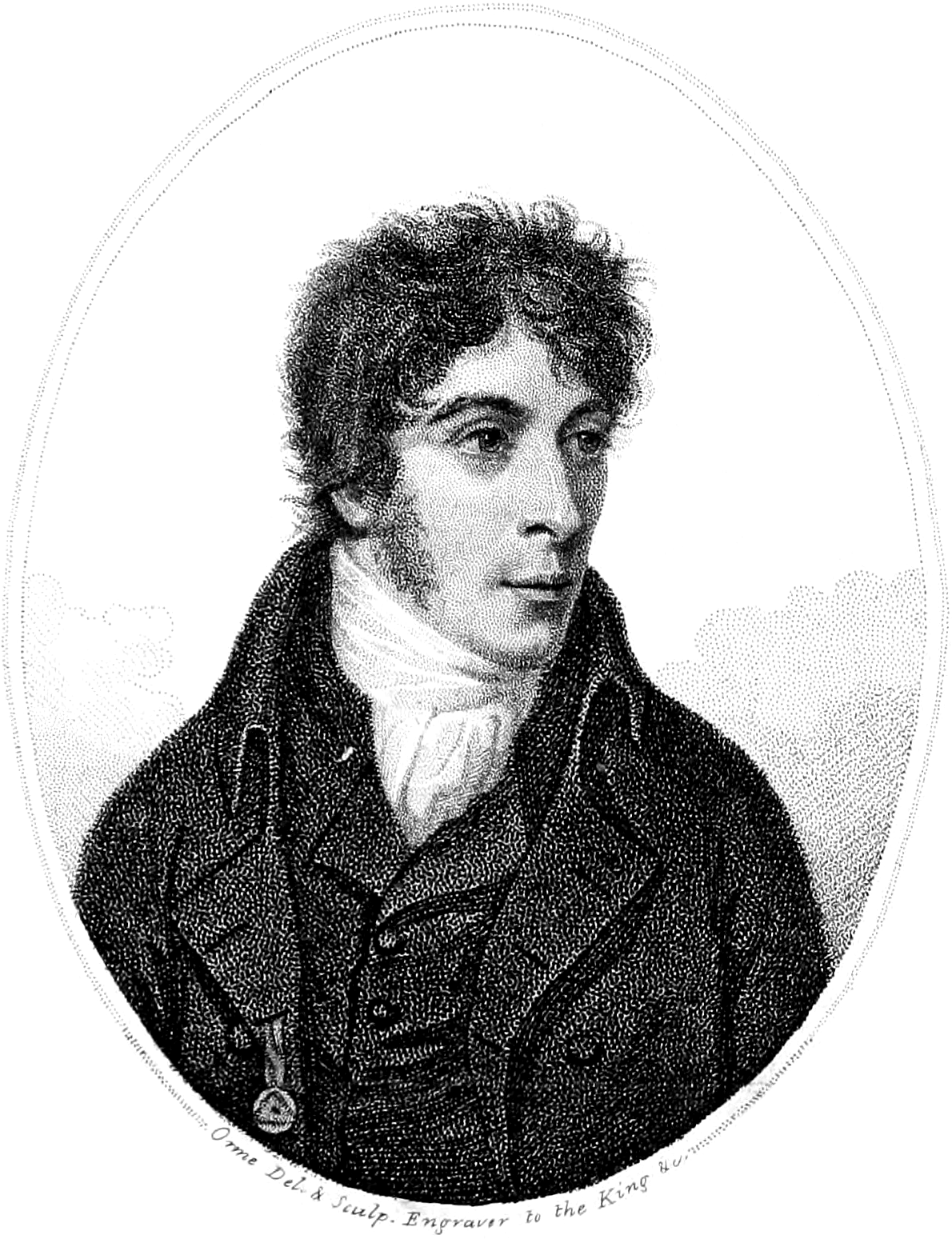
Portrait of Francis Barrett, author of the book The Magus (1801)

Francis Barrett (18 December 1774 - 1830) was an English occultist.

== Background ==
Barrett, an Englishman, claimed himself to be a student of chemistry, metaphysics and natural occult philosophy. He was known to be an extreme eccentric who gave lessons in the magical arts in his apartment and fastidiously translated Kabbalistic and other ancient texts into English, such as von Welling's work, Philosophy of The Universe circa 1735, from German (1801). According to his biographer Francis X. King, Barrett's parents were humble folk married in the parish of St. Martin's in the Fields on 29 September 1772.

== The Magus ==
Barrett was enthusiastic about reviving interest in the occult arts, and published a magical textbook called The Magus. It was a compilation, almost entirely consisting of selections from Cornelius Agrippa's Three Books of Occult Philosophy, the Fourth Book of Occult Philosophy attributed to Agrippa, and Robert Turner's 1655 translation of the Heptameron of Peter of Abano. Barrett made modifications and modernized spelling and syntax.

The Magus dealt with the natural magic of herbs and stones, magnetism, talismanic magic, alchemy, numerology, the elements, and biographies of famous adepts from history.

The Magus also served as an advertising tool. In it Barrett sought interested people wanting to help form his magic circle. An advertisement in The Magus (Vol. 2, p. 140) refers to an otherwise unknown school founded by Barrett.

According to the advertisement:

The Author of this Work respectfully informs those that are curious in the studies of Art and Nature, especially of Natural and Occult Philosophy, Chemistry, Astrology, etc., etc., that, having been indefatigable in his researches in those sublime Sciences; of which he has treated at large in this book, that he gives private instructions and lectures upon any of the above-mentioned Sciences; in the course of which he will discover many curious and rare experiments.

Those who become Students will be initiated into the choicest operations of Natural Philosophy, Natural Magic, the Cabbala, Chemistry, the Talismanic Arts, Hermetic Philosophy, Astrology, Physiognomy, etc., etc. Likewise they will acquire the knowledge of the Rites, Mysteries, Ceremonies and Principles of the ancient Philosophers, Magi, Cabbalists, and Adepts, etc.

The Purpose of this school (which will consist of no greater number than Twelve Students) being to investigate the hidden treasures of Nature; to bring the Mind to a contemplation of the Eternal Wisdom; to promote the discovery of whatever may conduce to the perfection of Man; the alleviating the miseries and calamities of this life, both in respect of ourselves and others; the study of morality and religion here, in order to secure to ourselves felicity hereafter; and, finally, the promulgation of whatever may conduce to the general happiness and welfare of mankind.

== Views ==
When writing about witches Barrett stated that he did not believe that their power to torment or kill by enchantment, touch or by using a wax effigy came from Satan. He claimed if the Devil wanted to kill a man guilty of deadly sin, he did not need a witch as an intermediary.

Barrett's belief in magical power might be summed up thus:

The magical power is in the inward or inner man. A certain proportion of the inner man longs for the external in all things. When the person is in the appropriate disposition an appropriate connection between man and object can be attained.

== Sources ==
- Francis King, The Flying Sorcerer (Oxford: Mandrake, 1992)
- Jason Semmens, “The Magus in Cornwall: An Unknown Chapter in the Life of Francis Barrett, F.R.C.” Old Cornwall 13, No. 1 (2003) pp. 18–21.
- Timothy D’Arch Smith, The Books of the Beast (London, 1987) pp. 89–97.
