= Ali Puli =

German alchemical writer

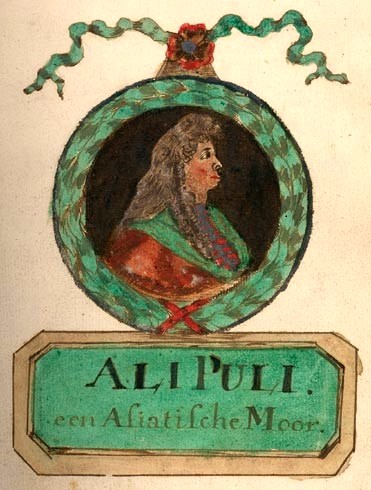
- 18th Century depiction of Ali Puli by Burghard de Groot
- Died: Not Specified
- Occupation: Alchemist
- Known for: Hermetic Philosopher and attributed author of Centrum Naturae Concentratum

Ali Puli, also known as Alipili, is the attributed author of a number of 17th-century alchemical and hermetic texts. However, his historical existence is doubtful, and A.E. Waite went as far as to describe the work attributed to him as "forgery pure and simple in respect of age and authorship [which] may be left to stand at its value in the matter of content."

He is described as a Mauretanian Christian of Asiatic extraction - also variously as an Arab (because he was said to have written in Arabic), and a Moor.

Most probably, Ali Puli is the pseudonym of Johann Otto von Helwig (1654-1698), a German physician, alchemist and author.

== Influence ==
The most influential work attributed to him is Centrum Naturae Concentratum. This work was purported to have been written originally in Arabic, though no Arabic version is extant. It was first published in German in 1682 by Johann Otto von Helwig. In 1694 a Dutch translation was published. It was first translated into English by Edmund Brice in 1696. It is most noted for the following passage:

I admonish thee, whosoever thou art, that desirest to dive into the innermost parts of Nature, if that thou seekest thou findeth not within thee, thou wilt never find it without thee.

The passage has been identified as a source of the Wiccan Charge of the Goddess produced by Gerald Gardner and later revised by Doreen Valiente. It is the oldest of the sources so identified.
