= Lucille Cedercrans =

American mystic

Lucille Cedercrans (1921–1984) was an esoteric mystic apparently influenced by ecumenical gnostic theism, particularly (neo-)Theosophy. However, she stated that the source of her writings was the result of a meditative state that put her in rapport with her teacher, whom she referred to as the Master R.

== Work ==
Most of her writings were stated to be written not from her own consciousness but were psychically or spiritually 'impressed' on her by her teacher. Her writings have been compared to those of Alice A. Bailey with which they have much in common, so much so that some accused her of plagiarism. However, her biography claims that she did not read or have knowledge of esoteric subjects and only began to familiarize herself with them after about 1953. Apparently, she did not study Theosophy or Bailey until much of her work was completed, her teacher having advised against it.

Lucille Cedercrans traveled extensively, developing and moving from one group center to another in response to an inner call. She would throw her things into suitcases, ask someone to send on her papers, and rush off. [...] This mobility and continual movement was, in part, by design. Lucille's intent was not to form an organization and have her work become an institution.

— Wisdom Impressions.

However, her work interested enough people that the Wisdom Impressions 'institution', or group of perennial Philosophers, such as Theosophists, focused on publishing her work, still exists; so do others and people that refer to her texts in their work.

She wrote an encyclopedic-sized set of articles (now in volumes) and her works include:

The Nature of The Soul
Corrective Thinking
Younger Brother Series
The Soul And Its Instrument
Creative Thinking
Leadership Training
The Disciple and Economy
The Path of Initiation
Ashramic Projections
Healing
Applied Wisdom
Headquarters Instruction
