= Nicholas Mann (occult writer) =

British writer

Nicholas R. Mann (born 1952) is the author of books on geomancy, mythology, the Celtic tradition, sacred geometry and, most recently, archaeoastronomy. Glastonbury, England, Avebury, England, Sedona, Arizona (USA) and Washington, DC (USA) are all locations which feature in his work. His book Druid Magic: The Practice of Celtic Wisdom, co-written with Maya Sutton, PhD, has been described by the British Druid Order as"One of the best practical guides available..." He is also an illustrator, producing the images for the Silver Branch Cards, a Celtic divination deck of his own design. He was born in Sussex, England. He lives in Somerset, England with his partner Philippa Glasson, with whom he co-authored The Star Temple of Avalon: Glastonbury's Ancient Observatory Revealed.

== Bibliography ==
- Avalon’s Red and White Springs: The Healing Waters of Glastonbury with Dr. Philippa Glasson (2005) Green Magic
- The Dark God: A Personal Journey Through the Underworld (1996) Llewellyn Publications ISBN 1-56718-460-X, ISBN 978-1-56718-460-0
- Druid Magic: The Practice of Celtic Wisdom with Maya Sutton, PhD (2001) Llewellyn ISBN 1-56718-481-2, ISBN 978-1-56718-481-5
- Energy Secrets of Glastonbury Tor (2004) Green Magic
- The Giants of Gaia with Marcia Sutton, PhD (1995) Brotherhood of Life Books ISBN 0-914732-32-3, ISBN 978-0-914732-32-7
- Glastonbury Tor: A Guide to the History and Legends (Pamphlet) (1993) Triskele Publications
- His Story: Masculinity in the Post-Patriarchal World (1995) Llewellyn Publications ISBN 1-56718-458-8, ISBN 978-1-56718-458-7
- The Isle of Avalon: Sacred Mysteries of Arthur and Glastonbury (2001) Green Magic ISBN 0-9536631-3-2, ISBN 978-0-9536631-3-2
- The Keltic Power Symbols: Native Traditions, the Keltic Goddess and God - The Serpent, the Power Animals and the Pictish Symbol Stones (1987) Triskele
- The Cauldron and the Grail (1986) Triskele
- Reclaiming the Gods: Magic, Sex, Death and Football (2002) Green Magic ISBN 0-9536631-8-3, ISBN 978-0-9536631-8-7
- The Sacred Geometry of Washington, D.C.: The Integrity and Power of the Original Design (2006) Green Magic ISBN 0-9547230-7-4, ISBN 978-0-9547230-7-1
- Sedona: Sacred Earth: A Guide to Geomantic Applications in the Red Rock Country (1989) Zivah Pub ISBN 0-9622707-0-9, ISBN 978-0-9622707-0-3
- Sedona: Sacred Earth - A Guide to the Red Rock Country (2005) Light Technology Publishing ISBN 1-891824-45-7, ISBN 978-1-891824-45-6
- The Silver Branch Cards: Divination using Druid Celtic Symbolism & Mythology (2000) Druidways
- The Star Temple of Avalon: Glastonbury's Ancient Observatory Revealed with Philippa Glasson (2007) ISBN 978-0-9555970-5-3
- Avebury Cosmos: The Neolithic World of Avebury henge, Silbury Hill, West Kennet long barrow, the Sanctuary & the Longstones Cove (2011) O-Books ISBN 978-1-84694-680-6
