= Stephen Skinner (writer) =

Australian writer, editor, publisher and lecturer

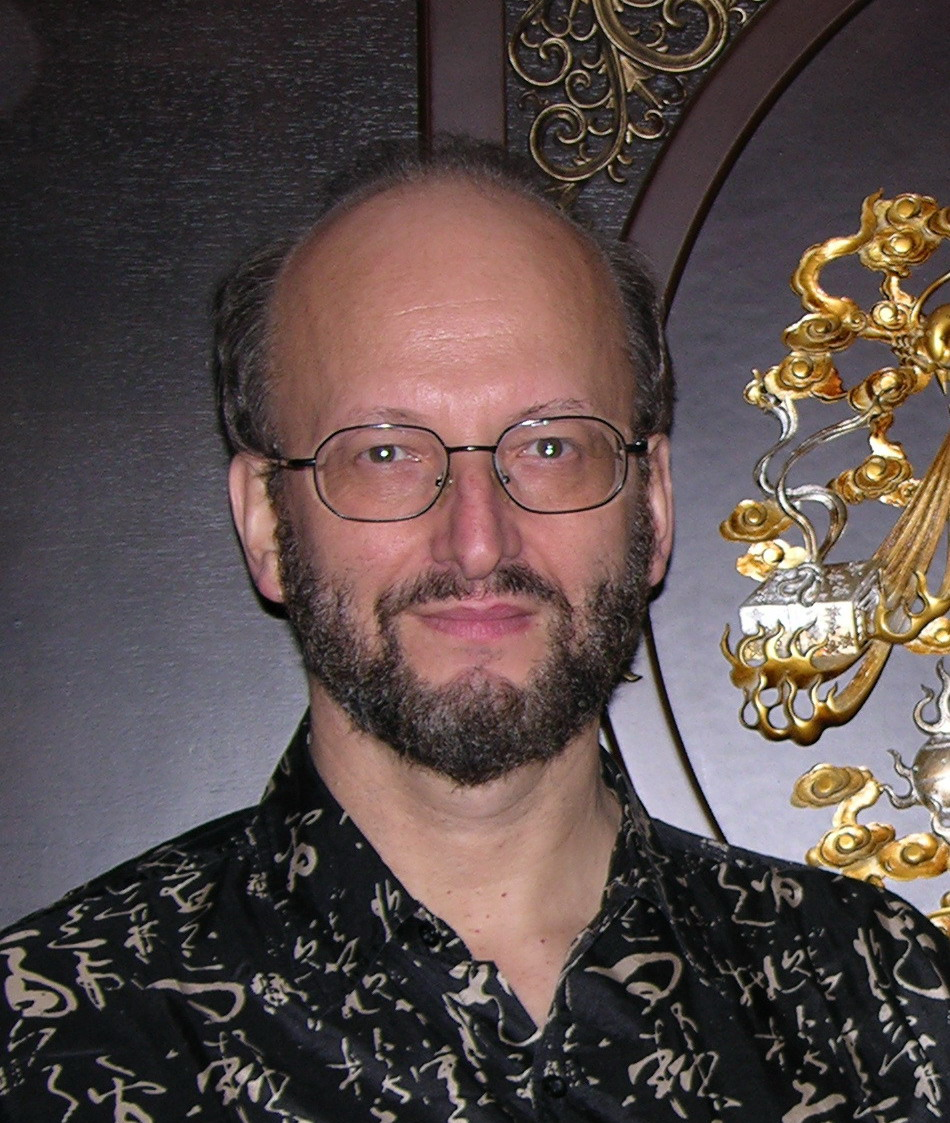
- Skinner at Ming Court in 2005
- Born: 22 March 1948 (age 78); Sydney, Australia
- Education: Sydney University (BA), University of Newcastle (PhD)
- Occupations: Author, publisher and lecturer
- Website: sskinner.com

Stephen Skinner (born 22 March 1948) is an Australian writer, editor, publisher and lecturer. He is known for authoring books on magic, feng shui, sacred geometry and alchemy. He has published more than 46 books in more than 20 languages.

== Early life and education ==
Born in Sydney, Australia, in March 1948, he lived there till 1972. He attended Trinity Grammar Preparatory School (Strathfield) and Sydney Grammar Secondary School from 1959 to 1964, matriculating with First Class Honors in English and honors in Geography. He earned his BA (Arts) at Sydney University from 1965 to 1968, majoring in English Literature and Geography, plus Philosophy (Greek Philosophy and formal Logic).

In 1967 he launched and edited two underground magazines in Sydney, titled Lucifer and Chaos. He worked for one year in the Intelligence section of the Department of Trade & Industry (1969), before an interest in the stock market lead to working full-time as a portfolio manager. From there, he moved to teaching as a Geography Master at St. Joseph's College in Hunters Hill, Sydney (1970), followed by Geography Lecturer at Sydney Technical College (now called the University of Technology) in 1971–72.

He received his Ph.D. in classics from the School of Humanities and Social Science at University of Newcastle in 2014 for a thesis on the transmission of magical techniques and equipment from the Graeco-Egyptian magical papyri (1st-5th century C.E.) via the Byzantine Magical Treatise of Solomon (Hygromanteia) to the 16th-18th century grimoires of Western Europe, specifically the Clavicula Salomonis. The thesis was later developed into two books: Techniques of Graeco-Egyptian Magic and Techniques of Solomonic Magic.

== Career ==
He migrated to London in December 1972 where his career alternated between book and magazine publishing and computer programming. In 1973, he founded Askin Publishers Ltd and became its managing director in order to print editions of the magical writings of Dr. John Dee, Cornelius Agrippa, Paracelsus, Austin Osman Spare, and Aleister Crowley. In 1976, he helped in the production of the Crowley Thoth Tarot card pack by arranging the re-photography of the original paintings in the Warburg Institute, which were later used in the revised edition published by U.S. Games Inc in that year.

In 1998 he launched and published Feng Shui for Modern Living magazine. Skinner organized and ran the London International Feng Shui Conference (co-sponsored by the Daily Express newspaper) at the Islington Exhibition Centre in London on 21–23 of May, 1999. In 2000, he was nominated for Publisher of the Year at the PPA Awards in London for the magazine Feng Shui for Modern Living.

Before leaving London, Skinner founded Golden Hoard Press Pte. Ltd, a book publishing company specializing in the publication of the classics of magic and feng shui, and began publishing the Source Works of Ceremonial Magic series with co-author David Rankine.

In 2003 he migrated to Johor Bahru in Malaysia, to facilitate his research into feng shui. In 2004 Skinner helped found the International Feng Shui Association in Singapore. He subsequently gave a number of lectures at their annual conventions. At the 27th International I-Ching Conference 2015 in Singapore, Skinner gave a lecture on the Hexagrams and Song Dynasty Feng Shui (14 November 2015). In April 2018 he relaunched Feng Shui for Modern Living Magazine online, publishing selected articles from the original 30 Volume 1 Editions along with new Volume 2 Editions. In 2010 he married Navaneeta Das, and moved to Singapore. In 2021 he moved back to London, where he currently lives.

In January 2022 Stephen was featured in the list of "The 100 Most Spiritually Influential People Living in 2022" in issue 68 of Watkins Mind Body and Spirit magazine.

=== Writing ===
Skinner is an author of books on the Western Esoteric Tradition, magic and feng shui. His first book (with co-author Nevill Drury) was Search for Abraxas published in 1972, and subsequently re-published in 2013 and 2016. With the publication of the Living Earth Manual of Feng Shui in 1976, the first book on feng shui in English written in the 20th century Skinner was "credited with bringing feng shui to the West".

In 2006, he published The Complete Magician's Tables which contains tables on Magic, Kabbalah, Angels, Astrology, Alchemy, Demons, Geomancy, Grimoires, Gematria, I Ching, Tarot, Pagan pantheons, plants, perfumes, and character correspondences in more than 800 Tables, four times as many tables as Aleister Crowley's Liber 777.

In 2008, he completed the Guide to the Feng Shui Compass, a detailed study of the rings of the Chinese luopan. A review of this book in a recent sinological academic journal, the reviewer stated "Stephen Skinner is probably the most important Western scholar taking the science of Feng shui seriously. In the past few decades he has made important contributions to clarifying the rather vague image from which Feng shui suffers in the West". This was followed by the publication of Feng Shui History: the story of Classical Feng Shui in China and the West from 221 BC to 2012 AD in 2013.

In 2011 he completed the editing and rectification of the text (using the original manuscripts) of Dr John Dee's A True & Faithful Relation of what passed for many years between Dr. John Dee...and some Spirits. This was published as Dr John Dee's Spiritual Diaries(1583-1608) in 2011. As well as original works he edited a number of 16th-18th century manuscripts on magic, making them available in print for the first time in the Sourceworks of Ceremonial Magic series.

Periplus contracted him to write a coffee table book on feng shui, Feng Shui Style. He set up a feng shui consultancy for both immigrants and the local Chinese community in both Singapore and Malaysia. There he continued writing books on magic, and publishing the Source Works of Ceremonial Magic series. The first volume of this series was The Practical Angel Magic of Dr. John Dee's Enochian Tables, opening the doors on 17th century angel magic. This was followed by The Keys to the Gateway of Magic and then The Goetia of Dr Rudd, a 17th-century version of the four books of the Lemegeton otherwise known as the Lesser Key of Solomon. The next volume in the series was an edition of three manuscripts of one of the most famous grimoires, The Veritable Key of Solomon.

He has written over 38 full length published books on magic and feng shui, with a further 11 edited and introduced, making a total of over 49 books mainly on magic and feng shui, but with a few others on alchemy, astrology, and sacred geometry.

His publishers include Periplus, Routledge, Tuttle, Salamander, Llewellyn Worldwide, Sterling, Nicholas Hayes, Penguin, Ibis Press, Simon & Schuster, Inner Traditions, Golden Hoard, Haldane Mason, Parragon, Cico, Trafalgar, etc.

His books have been translated into more than 20 languages and appear in many separate English editions in UK, US, Australia, Canada, South Africa, India and Singapore, making a total of over 90+ different editions. His books have had introductions written by people such as Colin Wilson and Jimmy Choo.

== Bibliography ==
=== Books on Magic, Western Esoteric Tradition, etc. ===
- The Search for Abraxas (with Nevill Drury) – Neville Spearman 1972, Salamander 2013, Golden Hoard 2016, ISBN 978-0-9932042-4-1
- Techniques of High Magic (with Francis King) – Daniels 1976, Inner Traditions 1981, Destiny Books 1990, Affinity 2005, Golden Hoard 2016, ISBN 978-0-993204234
- The Oracle of Geomancy: Techniques of Earth Divination - Prism, Devon, 1987, ISBN 978-0907061823
- Terrestrial Astrology: Divination by Geomancy - Law Book, Sydney, 1980, ISBN 978-0710005533
- Nostradamus: Prophecies of the World's Greatest Seer : Prophecies Fulfilled and Predictions for the Millennium & Beyond (with Francis King) - Carlton, London, 1994, ISBN 978-0312112028
- Millennium Prophecies: Predictions For The Year 2000 And Beyond - Carlton, London, 1994, ISBN 978-1858680347
- Practical Angel Magic of Dr John Dee's Enochian Tables (with David Rankine) - Golden Hoard, Llewellyn 2004, ISBN 978-0-9547639-0-9
- The Keys to the Gateway of Magic (with David Rankine) – Golden Hoard, Llewellyn 2005, ISBN 978-0-9547639-1-6
- Sacred Geometry - Gaia Books / Sterling Publishing 2006, ISBN 978-1-4027-6582-7
- Clavis Inferni: the Grimoire of Saint Cyprian (with David Rankine) – Golden Hoard 2009, ISBN 978-0-9557387-1-5
- The Goetia of Dr Rudd: Liber Malorum Spirituum (with David Rankine) – Golden Hoard 2009, ISBN 978-0-955738715.
- Geomancy in Theory & Practice – Golden Hoard, Llewellyn 2011, ISBN 978-0-9557387-0-8
- Veritable Key of Solomon (with David Rankine) – Golden Hoard, Llewellyn 2011, ISBN 978-0-9557387-6-0
- Dr John Dee's Spiritual Diaries (1583-1608): the revised edition of ‘A True & Faithful Relation of what passed between Dr John Dee & some Spirits’ - Golden Hoard 2011, ISBN 978-0-9557387-8-4.
- Key to the Latin of Dr John Dee's Spiritual Diaries (1583-1608) - Golden Hoard 2012, ISBN 978-0-9568285-5-2
- Sepher Raziel also known as Liber Salomonis a 1564 English Grimoire (with Don Karr) - Golden Hoard 2010, ISBN 978-0-9557387-3-9
- Techniques of Graeco-Egyptian Magic - Golden Hoard, Llewellyn, 2014, ISBN 978-0-9568285-6-9
- Techniques de Magie Greco-Egyptienne Magic - Editions Alliance Magique, 2017, ISBN 978-2-3673602-4-9
- Techniques of Solomonic Magic - Golden Hoard, Llewellyn 2015, ISBN 978-9810943103
- The Complete Magician's Tables – 5th edition - Golden Hoard, Llewellyn 2015, ISBN 978-0-9547639-7-8
- A Cunning Man's Grimoire (with David Rankine) – Golden Hoard, Llewellyn 2018, ISBN 978-1912212101
- The Clavis or Key to Unlock the Mysteries of Magic by Rabbi Solomon translated by Ebenezer Sibley (with Daniel Clark) – Golden Hoard, Llewellyn 2018, ISBN 978-1912212088
- Ars Notoria (with Daniel Clark) – Golden Hoard, Llewellyn, 2019, ISBN 978-1912212033
- Ars Notoria the Method – Golden Hoard, Llewellyn, 2021, ISBN 978-1912212286

=== Books edited and introduced by ===
- The Magical Diaries of Aleister Crowley (edited and introduced) - Red Wheel Weiser/ Spearman, London, 1996, ISBN 978-0877288565
- Agrippa's Fourth Book of Occult Philosophy (edited and introduced) - Ibis Books, Lake Worth, 2005, ISBN 978-0892541003
- The Archidoxes of Magic (edited and introduced) - Ibis Books, Lake Worth, 2005, ISBN 978-0892540976
- Michael Psellus on the Operation of Daemons (edited and introduced) - Golden Hoard, Singapore, 2010, ISBN 978-0738723549
- The Voynich Manuscript: The Complete Edition of the World's Most Mysterious and Esoteric Codex (contributed foreword) - Watkins, London, 2017, ISBN 978-1786780775
- Both Sides of Heaven: Essays on Angels, Fallen Angels and Demons (contributed essay) - Avalonia 2009, ISBN 978-1905297269
- Climbing the Tree of Life: A Manual of Practical Magickal Qabalah by David Rankine (contributed foreword) - Avalonia 2005, ISBN 978-1905297061
- Collection of Magical Secrets by David Rankine & Paul Harry Barron (edited & introduced) - Avalonia 2009, ISBN 978-1905297207
- Complete Enochian Dictionary: A Dictionary of the Angelic Language by Don Laycock (edited & introduced) - Askin 1978, Weiser 2001, ISBN 978-1578632541
- Splendor Solis: The World's Most famous Alchemical Manuscript (introduction and commentary) - Watkins, London, 2018, ISBN 978-1786782052
- Aleister Crowley's Four Books of Magic (edited and introduced) - Watkins, London, 2021.

=== Books on Feng Shui ===
- Flying Star Feng Shui - Tuttle, 2002, ISBN 978-0804834339
- Guide to the Feng Shui Compass: a Compendium of Classical Feng Shui – Golden Hoard, Llewellyn 2008, ISBN 978-0-9547639-9-2
- Feng Shui History: the story of Classical Feng Shui in China and the West from 221 BC to 2012 AD – Golden Hoard, Llewellyn 2013, ISBN 9780956828552
- Advanced Flying Star Feng Shui - Golden Hoard/Llewellyn 2015, ISBN 978-1912212057
- The Living Earth Manual of Feng Shui – RKP, Penguin, Arkana, Brash 1976, 1981, 1991, 2006, ISBN 978-9971947330
- KISS Guide to Feng Shui (Keep It Simple Series) - DK, London, 2001, ISBN 978-0789481474
- Feng Shui: The Traditional Oriental Way To Enhance Your Life - Parragon, London, 2002, ISBN 978-0752562384
- Feng Shui: The Traditional Oriental Way (boxed set with mini luopan - Parragon, London, 2002, ISBN 978-0752542140
- Feng Shui Style: The Asian Art of Gracious Living - Periplus, Singapore, 2004, ISBN 978-0794602314.
- The Water Dragon – Golden Hoard/CreateSpace 2016, ISBN 978-1533506894
- The Original Eight Mansions Formula – Golden Hoard/CreateSpace 2016, ISBN 978-1533507488
- The Key San He Feng Shui Formulas – Golden Hoard/CreateSpace 2016, ISBN 978-1533517579
- The Mountain Dragon – Golden Hoard/CreateSpace 2016, ISBN 978-1533517654
- Tibetan Oracle Pack - Carroll & Brown 2005, ISBN 978-1904760047
