= Murry Hope =

English writer and occultist

- Born: 17 September 1929; Westcliffe-on-Sea, Southend-on-Sea, England
- Died: 25 October 2012; Emsworth, West Sussex, England
- Occupation: Writer
- Writing career
- Language: English

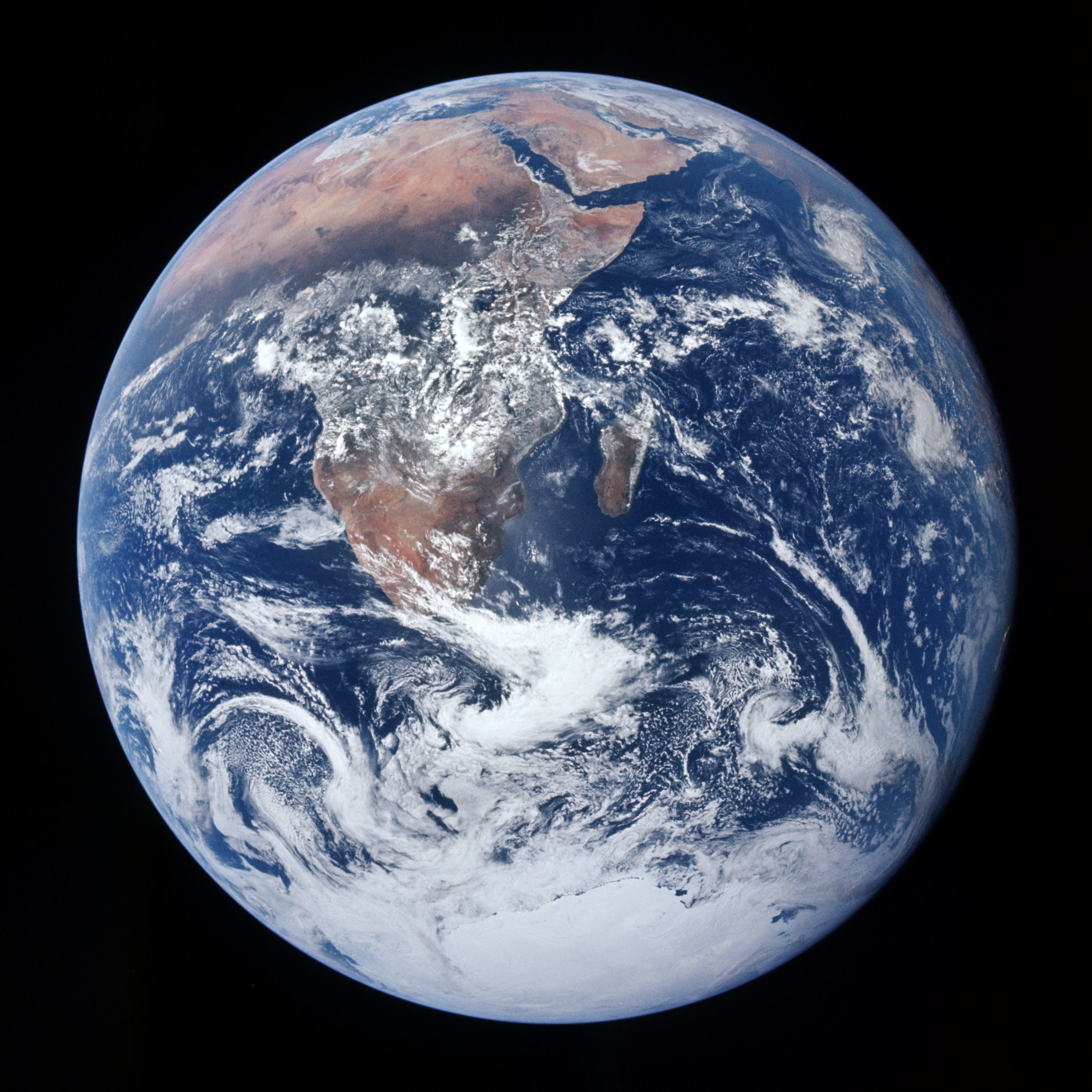
Hope argued that Gaia, a living and conscious being, must be protected in her work The Gaia Dialogues.

Murry Hope (17 September 1929 – 25 October 2012) was an English writer and occultist. Considered a Wiccan priestess and a New Age author, she wrote sundry books on the topics of psychology, human consciousness, the future of planet Earth, witchcraft, the Sirius star system, etc.

== Early life ==
Hope's mother left her after she was born and her father died of throat cancer at a very early age. She was raised by her nurse, Rhoda Adams. A bomb killed her nanny in 1945, leaving her in the care of Adams's husband and niece who were in the country at the time. At 19 Hope was a member of the Women's Royal Air Force. In 1951 she was working for the Officer's Association of the British Legion.

== Opera career ==
Hope studied voice, taking lessons with a teacher from the Paris Conservatoire and in London had a small part in West End production for two years. She received an opera scholarship at the Royal College of Music where she stayed for three years, then joined the English National Opera. Her premiere was the mystical opera The Magic Flute.

== Occult and writing ==
In 1957 she co-founded the Atlanteans Society with Tony Neate, a healing and spiritual group at Malvern Hills, England, that aimed to treat issues such as exorcism and mental disorders. By that time Hope wrote a seasonal column for Prediction magazine, a periodical oriented towards mystical subjects, where she used to sign the pseudonym Athene Williams. In 1975 Hope left the association claiming incompatibility between the predominant Christian layout settled amidst Atlanteans and her Pagan beliefs.

In 1977 Hope had her alleged psychic abilities tested by a doctor from Cambridge University under the supervision of the broadcaster BBC and obtained good results. Hope claimed to remember her past lives including not being human by belonging to the devic kingdom.

In her esoteric essays Hope created the Cartouche, a method of divination which used cards that she claimed heightened levels of awareness. based on symbols of energies on the monuments and walls of various Egyptian temples. She contracted Martin Jones in 1983 to develop artwork for the deck with symbols. The same year Hope and Jed Collard founded Ostaris Publications which produced 3,000 decks of these cards with accompanying guide book. The decks sold well, drawing a business transaction between Jed Collard and the American book publisher St. Martin's Press. Following this success, oversized cards and a larger guidance book were printed by St. Martins. Her final contribution was the book The Way of Cartouche, published in 1985.

In 1988 Hope founded the Institute of Transpersonal Sensitivity in America, intending to establish a relation between transpersonal experience and the approved schools of psychology.

== Personal life ==
Hope married four times; she had no children.

== Death ==
Murry Hope died 25 October 2012 in Emsworth, West Sussex, aged 83. Her remains were cremated at the Chichester Crematorium on 12 November 2012.

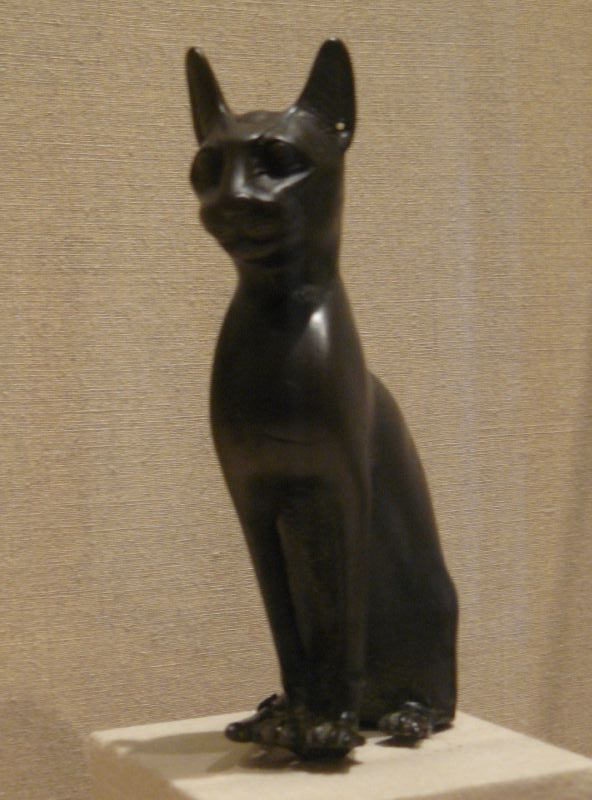
Egyptian goddess Bastet, a possible representation of leonine beings from Sirius star system, surmises Murry Hope.

== Themes ==
Hope's frequent themes, including "the roots of ancient Egyptian civilization", are explored through books like Ancient Egypt: The Sirius Connection of 1991, The Paschats and the Crystal People of 1992 and others. There she calls attention to the knowledge possessed by North African tribes, namely the Dogons, and conducts the reader on a trip across an alleged alien legacy descended from the "tri-star system of Sirius". She claims that beryl stone represents the Sirius star system and emerald the "Sirius C star", which create a cosmic link between initiates from Egyptian and stellar energies. Later on she examines the nature of leonine entities from Sirius called Paschats which, conjectures Hope, through the lion goddess Bastet were worshiped in Egypt.

Particularly in The Gaia Dialogues (1995), Hope defends the natural world asserting that the Earth (Gaia) is a conscious being, a living entity who is shifting its magnetic poles as part of a plan to defend itself from desolation caused by its human children.

== Books ==
- Practical Egyptian Magic, Aquarian Press, 1984, ISBN 0-85030-361-3; republished as The Ancient Wisdom of Egypt, Thorsons Publishers, 1999, ISBN 978-0-7225-3582-0.
- The Way of Cartouche: An Oracle of Ancient Egyptian Magic, St. Martin's Press, 1985. ISBN 0-312-85823-X.
- Practical Techniques of Psychic Self-Defense, St. Martin's Press, 1986, ISBN 0-312-63552-4.
- Practical Greek Magic: A Complete Manual of a Unique Magical System Based on the Classical Legends of Ancient Greece, Aquarian Press, 1987, ISBN 0-85030-430-X.
- Practical Celtic Magic: A Working Guide to the Magical Heritage of the Celtic Races, Aquarian Press, 1988, ISBN 0-85030-624-8.
- The Lion People: Intercosmic Messages from the Future, 1989; republished by Thoth Publications, 2006. ISBN 978-1-870450-01-0.
- Essential Woman: Her Mystery, Her Power, Thoth Publications, 1990, ISBN 1-85274-097-3.
- The Nine Lives of Tyo, Thoth Publications, 1990, ISBN 1-870450-12-4.
- The Psychology of Healing, Element Books, 1990, ISBN 1-85230-107-4; rev. ed., Vega Books, 2002, ISBN 978-1-84333-658-7.
- Time: The Ultimate Energy, Element Books, 1991, ISBN 1-85230-237-2; rev. ed., Vega Books, 2002, ISBN 978-1-84333-261-9.
- Ancient Egypt: The Sirius Connection, Element Books, 1991. ISBN 1-85230-177-5; republished as The Sirius Connection: Unlocking the Secrets of Ancient Egypt, Element Books, 1996, ISBN 978-1-85230-818-6 (hardcover), ISBN 978-1-86204-102-8 (paperback).
- Atlantis: Myth or Reality?, Penguin, 1991, ISBN 0-14-019232-8.
- The Elements of the Greek Tradition, Element Books, 1991, ISBN 1-85230-112-0.
- Olympus: An Experience of Self-Discovery, Aquarian Press, 1991, ISBN 1-85538-128-1.
- The Psychology of Ritual, Element Books, 1991, ISBN 1-85230-043-4.
- Practical Atlantean Magic: A Study of the Science, Mysticism and Theurgy of Ancient Atlantis, Aquarian Press, 1992, ISBN 1-85538-069-2; republished as The Ancient Wisdom of Atlantis, Thorsons Publishers, 1999, ISBN 978-0-7225-3585-1.
- The Paschats and the Crystal People, Thoth Publications, 1992, ISBN 1-870450-13-2.
- The Gaia Dialogues, Thoth Publications, 1995, ISBN 1-870450-18-3.
- Cosmic Connections, Thoth Publications, 1996, ISBN 1-870450-20-5.
- The Changeling: The Autobiography of Murry Hope, The College of Psychic Studies, 1999, ISBN 978-0-903336-31-4.
- The Ancient Wisdom of the Celts, Thorsons Publishers, 1999, ISBN 978-0-7225-3586-8.
- The World of Psychism: An Authoritative Study of Mysticism and Magic, Thoth Publications, 2001, ISBN 978-1-870450-44-7.

== See also ==
- Ceremonial magic
- Dogon people
- Drawing Down the Moon
- Earth Mother
- Gaia philosophy
- Judy Harrow
- List of occultists
- List of occult writers
- Maggie Shayne
- Neopaganism
- Nommo
- The Sirius Mystery
- Zecharia Sitchin
