= M. R. Sellars =

American novelist

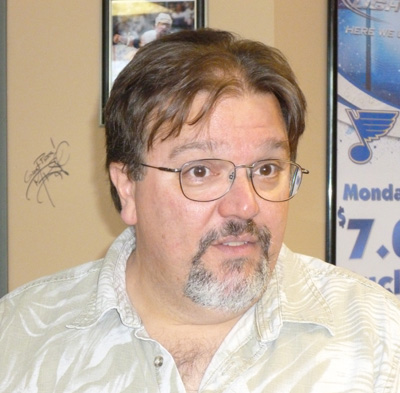
- Born: February 20, 1962 (age 64); Fulton, Kentucky
- Writing career
- Period: 2000–present
- Genres: Thriller fiction, Paranormal fiction, horror fiction, mystery (fiction)
- Notable works: The Rowan Gant Investigations, The Special Agent Constance Mandalay Novels
- Website: mrsellars.com

Murvel Russell Sellars Jr. (M. R. Sellars) (born February 20, 1962) is an American paranormal, thriller, horror, and mystery writer. He is best known for his Rowan Gant Investigations series about a practicing Witch turned occult detective, who aids the Saint Louis police department in solving bizarre crimes. He is a member of the International Thriller Writers, and a former member of the Horror Writers Association.

== Early life ==
Born in Fulton, Kentucky, Sellars spent the first one and a half years of his life on the family farm before the family relocated to Saint Louis, Missouri in the early sixties. His sister, Sandra, was born in Saint Louis in December 1965. He resided in Saint Ann, Missouri during his childhood and teen years.

After graduating Ritenour High School in 1980, Sellars attended college, majoring in Journalism and Literature before eventually pursuing a career in the growing field of computer and electronics technology.

== Personal life ==
He married "Kat" Sellars in October 1987. They have one daughter.

It was while working as a computer technician in the repair center for the now defunct chain, Crazy Dave's Computertrend, that Sellars met his wife, Kat, who at the time was his immediate supervisor. He details their meeting, courtship, and eventual marriage in a humorous, and per his own words, "sometimes sappy," series of entries at his blog, Brainpan Leakage.

== Writing career ==
Although working as a computer network and printer technician, Sellars continued to write short stories, as well as full-length novel manuscripts. He sporadically submitted them to agents in search of representation. For a period of several years, he gave up on hopes of publication, but still wrote on a regular basis. Per his own accounting, in 1995 he was looking through some of his old works and was inspired to write Harm None, which he finished in early 1996. He once again started seeking representation, and after several "near misses," finally sold the manuscript in 1999. Harm None: A Rowan Gant Investigation was published in May 2000, and became the first in the series of "Rowan Gant Investigation" ("RGI") novels to be published over the subsequent decade. It was followed in May 2001 by Never Burn A Witch: A Rowan Gant Investigation, which was actually the original working title of Harm None.

In addition to the "RGI" series he has also written short works of fiction for anthologies, and in 2010 launched a second series centered around a different protagonist, FBI Special Agent Constance Mandalay, a recurring character in the Rowan Gant novels. (see bibliography below)

== The Writing Process ==
Sellars refers to himself as a "seat of the pants" type of writer, starting at the beginning and working his way toward the ending, conducting research into the story and writing notes, but not creating an extensive outline. In a 2011 interview with The Big Thrill magazine he is quoted as saying he doesn't really know where a story is going to take him until he gets there.

In the same article, regarding research and the writing process he went on to call himself a "harmless sociopath" when it comes to getting into the mindset of a particular story, and outlines his three basic rules for the process.

== Career Obstacles ==
Sellars' writing career faced a major hurdle at the very outset. Due to a printing error, the initial run of the novel, Harm None, was produced from the wrong set of files, which were unedited and had been intended solely for use in producing Advance Review Copies. Unfortunately, several thousand copies of the erroneous version made it to market.

This error brought about harsh criticism from reviewers and readers regarding the typos and formatting errors, yet in many cases the novel was still praised for the story itself. The novel was quickly reprinted with the proper, edited files, and the cover was altered to distinguish between the versions.

Even more than a decade after its release an occasional flawed copy will surface in a garage sale or second-hand bookstore, and then be picked up by a reader who is unaware of the circumstances behind the gaff. Subsequently, Harm None will receive a fresh negative review on the web. November 2009 Sellars penned a blog entry about the longevity of the unfortunate mistake in response to a complaint email he received from a reader.

Another obstacle came at the beginning of July 2001. While on a camp-out with family and friends, Sellars' appendix unexpectedly burst. As he was in a semi-remote, wooded area with no cell reception, it was necessary to transport him several miles to a two-lane highway and contact emergency services via landline from a canoe rental establishment on Highway K in Reynolds County, Missouri. He was taken by ambulance to the nearest hospital in Ellington, Missouri, which unfortunately, due to budget cuts, had no operational surgical facilities at that time. After being stabilized, he was transported by a second ambulance to the next closest medical center, Lucy Lee Hospital in Poplar Bluff, Missouri where he underwent emergency surgery. As a result of the extended transport time allowing for the spread of infection in his abdomen, he remained hospitalized for a week, the first two days of which were "touch and go" according to his doctor.

== Rumors of his death ==
Late 2003, following the death of Sellars' father, Murvel Rusell Sellars, SR., a rumor began surfacing - especially within the alternative spirituality community - that M. R. Sellars was dead, and that the person making appearances was actually a shill hired by the family to promote his novels, which were being released posthumously by his estate. Although Sellars and his publicist debunked the rumor on several occasions, there were a few holdouts who would cite his father's obituary as proof that he was dead, even though Murvel Russell Sellars, JR. is mentioned as his surviving son.

It has been posited that exaggerated re-tellings via "the grapevine" about Sellars' emergency surgery in 2001, followed by his father's death in 2003 gave rise to the story. In any event, the rumor eventually faded out over the years.

== Convention appearances ==
Sellars has toured extensively, appearing as a Guest of Honor (GoH) and speaker/panelist at several Science Fiction/Fantasy Conventions, Alternative Spirituality Festivals, and Mystery Writer Conferences, as well as bookstores nationwide.

== Unofficial fan club ==
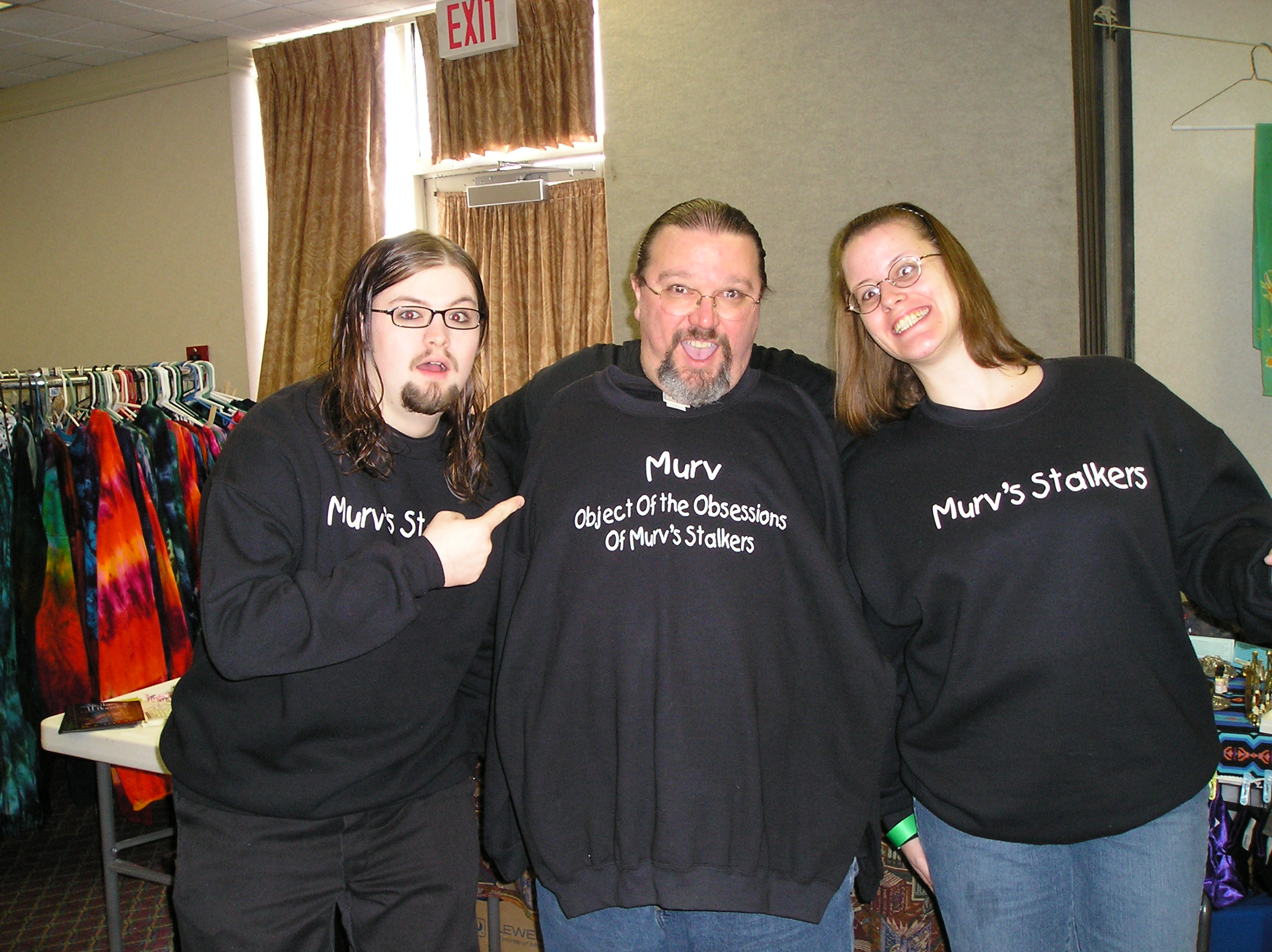

Early 2007, a pair of fans started an M. R. Sellars fan club they named "Murv's Stalkers." The unofficial organization was created as a joke according to the founders, with the primary focus being that of presenting Sellars with an imprinted sweatshirt at one of his book signing events in Columbia, Missouri. The founders of the club are pictured (left) with Sellars at the event, making the presentation.

== Fan interaction ==
When not touring, Sellars makes extensive use of the Internet to keep in touch with - and to interact with - his readers. In addition to his personal website and blog, he maintains a healthy presence on social media, especially Facebook and Twitter. His often candid, satirical observations about writing and life in general earned him a spot on the Mashable Literary Tweets: 100+ of the Best Authors On Twitter in 2009, and the Huffington Post Books Section Great Authors To Follow On Twitter in 2011.

== M. R. Sellars Bibliography ==
From WillowTree Press/E.M.A Mysteries:

The Rowan Gant Investigations Series

* Harm None: A Rowan Gant Investigation (2000) ISBN 978-0-9678221-0-5
* Never Burn A Witch: A Rowan Gant Investigation (2001) ISBN 978-0-9678221-1-2
* Perfect Trust: A Rowan Gant Investigation (2002) ISBN 978-0-9678221-9-8
* The Law Of Three: A Rowan Gant Investigation (2003) ISBN 978-0-9678221-8-1
* Crone's Moon: A Rowan Gant Investigation (2004) ISBN 978-0-9678221-4-3
* Love Is The Bond: A Rowan Gant Investigation (2005) ISBN 978-0-9678221-2-9
* All Acts Of Pleasure: A Rowan Gant Investigation (2006) ISBN 978-0-9678221-3-6
* The End Of Desire: A Rowan Gant Investigation (2007) ISBN 978-0-9678221-6-7
* Blood Moon: A Rowan Gant Investigation (2008) ISBN 978-0-9794533-3-5
* Miranda: A Rowan Gant Investigation (2010) ISBN 978-0-9794533-6-6
* Ghoul Squad Rowan Gant Investigations E-book Omnibus - RGI Novels 1, 2, and 3 (2012) ISBN 978-1-937778-00-2
* Death Wears High Heels Rowan Gant Investigations E-book Omnibus - (Miranda Trilogy) RGI Novels 6, 7, and 8 (2012) ISBN 978-1-937778-01-9

The Special Agent Constance Mandalay Novels

* Merrie Axemas: A Killer Holiday Tale Special Edition E-Novella (2010) ISBN 978-0-9794533-7-3
* In The Bleak Midwinter: A Special Agent Constance Mandalay Novel (2011) ISBN 978-0-9794533-8-0

Anthologies

From Belfire Press:
* Courting Morpheus (Anthology) includes original RGI novelette "You're Gonna Think I'm Nuts..." (2010) ISBN 978-0-9864831-1-0
From Dark Moon Books:
* Slices Of Flesh (Anthology) FlashFic Horror Short "Last Call" (2012) ISBN 978-0-9850290-9-8

== Awards ==
- Saint Louis Riverfront Times People's Choice Award - Best Novel by a Local Author (2003) for The Law Of Three: A Rowan Gant Investigation
- Preditors and Editors Readers Poll Best Mainstream Novel Award - (2006) for All Acts Of Pleasure: A Rowan Gant Investigation
- Coalition Of Visionary Resources - Finalist, Best Visionary Fiction Novel - (2009) for Blood Moon: A Rowan Gant Investigation
