= Kyriacos C. Markides =

Greek Cypriot sociologist (born 1942)

Kyriacos C. Markides (born November 19, 1942) is a Greek Cypriot sociologist based in the United States.

He teaches at the University of Maine and has written several books on Christian mysticism.

== Work ==
Born in Nicosia, in his early books he explored first a circle of healers on Cyprus surrounding "Daskalos" (a pseudonym for Stylianos Atteshlis), who combined some Christian beliefs with shamanistic practices, and latterly mystical Christianity through his association with a charismatic elder, Father Maximos, a former monk from Mount Athos, and a close disciple when on Athos of the great 20th-century Greek saint, Paisios of Mount Athos. (Maximos is, apparently, Markides' pseudonym for a Cypriot bishop, namely Metropolitan Athanasios of Limassol.) Markides essentially returned to his Orthodox Christian roots of childhood, centering his latter books around conversations with Father Maximos when he got posted to Cyprus to be an Abbot, and then later to be Bishop and Metropolitan. Markides visited him there many times, and also returns to Mount Athos, the great monastic centre of North Greece where 2,500 monks reside. Markides has also given lectures and workshops around the United States, Canada and other countries as well as appearing on US television and being interviewed by radio stations, newspapers and magazines. There is a fairly wide-ranging interview in two parts with Kevin Allen of Ancient Faith Radio available online as an audio download or transcript. Dr. Markides also spoke for the San Antonio, Texas-based South Texas Geriatric Education Center (STGEC) in 2000.

In his earlier books Markides seems content to see any psychic phenomenon as of interest and value in itself and is also quick to draw (apparent) parallels between different religions or to gesture towards "the perennial philosophy". However, he has gradually moved away from these assumptions. Speaking to Kevin Allen he avers "... it was a revelation to me that there might be something over and beyond the physical material universe. So, that was the starting point. Then, of course, I realized that there are grey areas and there are problematic kinds of phenomena [that not all] are good, necessarily." It is not clear where Markides stands on some of these issues now.

In addition Markides has written a book about the political sociology of the Cyprus problem.

== Personal life ==
Markides lives in the Stillwater neighborhood of Old Town, Maine, with his wife, Emily, whom he describes in his books an eco-feminist and peace activist.

== Books ==
- The Rise and Fall of the Cyprus Republic, Yale University Press, 1977, ISBN 978-0-300-02089-2
- The Magus of Strovolos (1985)
- Homage to the Sun (1987)
- Fire in the Heart
- Riding with the Lion (1994)
- The Mountain of Silence: A Search for Orthodox Spirituality, Doubleday, 2001. ISBN 978-0-385-50092-0
- Gifts of the Desert: The Forgotten Path of Christian Spirituality, Doubleday, 2005, ISBN 978-0-385-50663-2
- Inner River: A Pilgrimage to the Heart of Christian Spirituality, Image, 2012. ISBN 978-0-307-88587-6
- The Accidental Immigrant: A Quest for Spirit in a Skeptical Age, Hamilton Books (2021), ISBN 978-0761872870
