= Migene González-Wippler =

Puerto Rican writer

- Born: Puerto Rico
- Education: University of Puerto Rico; Columbia University

Migene González-Wippler is a Puerto Rican new-age author and a leading expert on the Afro-Caribbean religion of Santería.

== Education ==
González-Wippler was born in Puerto Rico and has degrees in psychology and anthropology from the University of Puerto Rico, and from Columbia University, from where she earned a Ph.D. in cultural anthropology.

== Career ==
In addition to her solid background in social sciences she has also worked as a science editor for the Interscience Division of John Wiley, the American Institute of Physics, and the American Museum of Natural History, and as an English editor for the United Nations in Vienna, where she resided for many years. She is a cultural anthropologist and lectures frequently at universities and other educational institutions. She writes about Santeria-its practices, beliefs and organization.

== Bibliography ==
- El libro completo de magia, hechizos, y ceremonias
- El libro de las sombras
- Keys to the Kingdom: Jesus & the Mystic Kabbalah
- Book of Shadows
- The Complete Book of Amulets & Talismans
- Luna, Luna: Magia, poder y seducción
- La Magia de las piedras y los cristales
- Sueños: Lo que significan para usted
- Amuletos y Talismanes
- La magia y tú
- What Happens After Death: Scientific & Personal Evidence for Survival
- Santería: La Religión
- Dreams and What They Mean to You
- The Complete Book of Spells, Ceremonies & Magic
- Las llaves del reino: Jesús y la cábala cristiana
- Kabbalah For The Modern World
- Angelorum: El libro de los ángeles
- Santería: mis experiencias en la Religión
- Peregrinaje: la vida después de la muerte
- Santería: the Religion: Faith, Rites, Magic, Llewellyn Publications: 2002 ISBN 9781567183290
- Cabala para el mundo moderno
- Powers of the Orishas: Santeria and The Worship of Saints
