= Anthony Marais =

American writer, musician, and academic (born 1966)

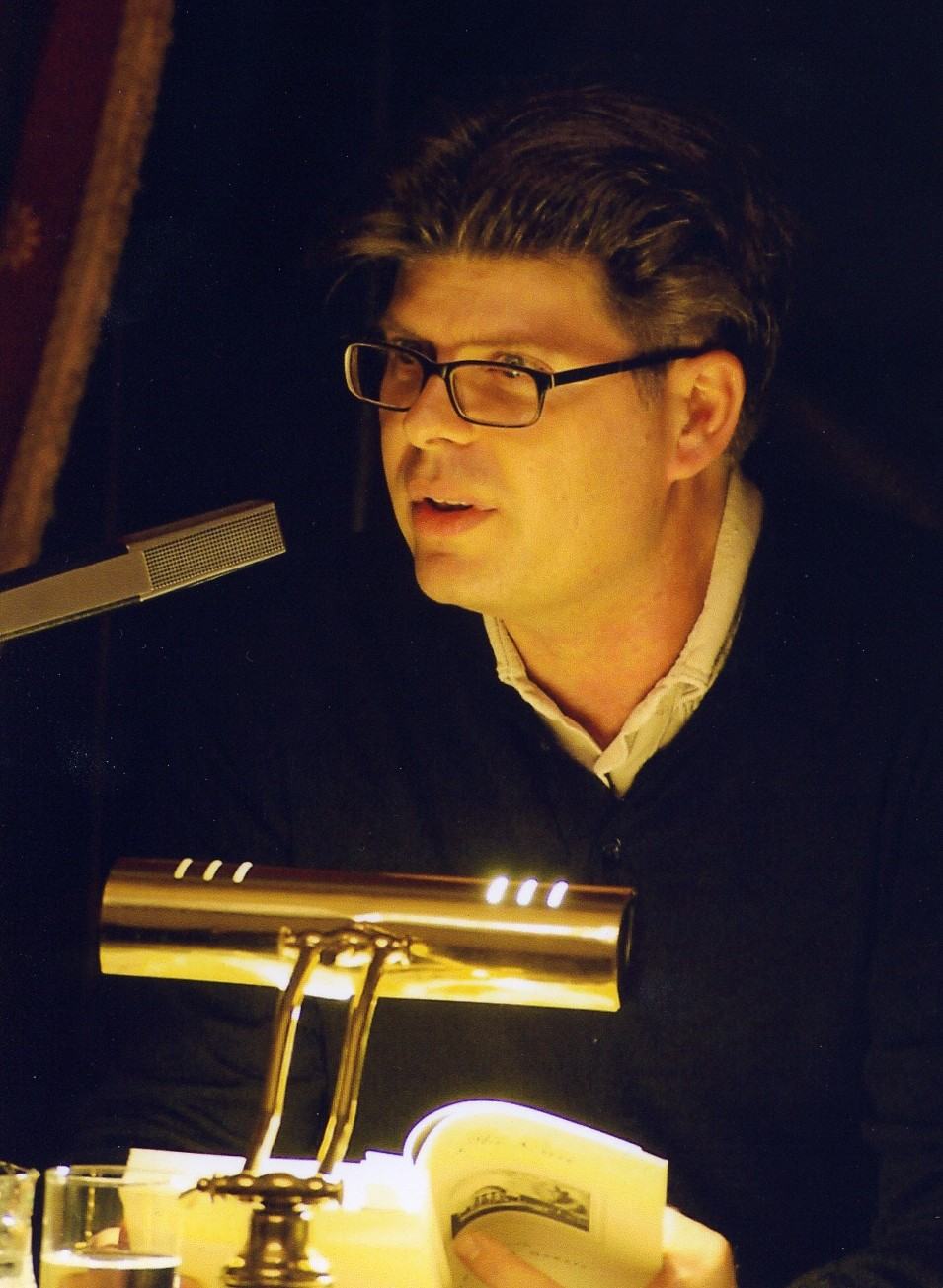
- Marais in Wiesbaden (2007)
- Born: April 7, 1966 (age 60); Hollywood, Los Angeles
- Occupation: Writer
- Writing career
- Notable works: The Xenophobe's Guide to the Californians (2000), The Cure (2006)

Anthony Marais (born 1966, Hollywood, California) is an American writer, musician, and academic. His writing focuses on culture, alchemy and the tendency of people to follow delusions.

== Career ==
Marais graduated from the University of California, Berkeley with a bachelor's degree in anthropology, then continued his education in Canada at Simon Fraser University in British Columbia, focusing on Polynesian archaeology, where he earned a master's degree in archaeology with a thesis on fortifications in Tonga.

Marais studied language and art history in Paris and since 1995 has lived in Germany, during which time he began publishing novels and working as a screenwriter. He currently teaches English composition and creative writing at the Anglo-American University in Prague.

== Publications ==
=== Novels and screenplays ===
- Marais, Anthony (2006). The Cure. Newport Beach, California: Balneum Books. ISBN 0-9774792-0-X. The Cure describes a man's mental journey. Fleeing unusual troubles, the protagonist arrives in Wiesbaden, Germany. Here he develops an obsession with the town's healing springs leading to a surreal journey into the occult.
- Marais, Anthony; Marszewski, Jarek (2007). Plateau. Balneum Books. ISBN 978-0977479245. Plateau, a screenplay co-written with Jarek Marszewski, is the story of a thirteen-year-old girl who finds a dying man along the roadside near her small town. Into this situation stumbles a local womanizer and drunk. This unlikely pair find themselves helping one another against their will and ultimately secure their survival on the plateau. In 2009 the screenplay was optioned by Opus Film of Poland.
- Marais, Anthony (2012). Insured Risk. Newport Beach, California: Balneum Books. Insured Risk is a novel about a Californian family dealing with the revealed homosexuality of the husband/father in conjunction with his diagnosis of a fatal disease. While swindling insurance companies the protagonist develops the delusion that he is recovering, inciting his agent to hire a contract killer.

=== Translations ===
- Marais, Anthony (2025). Employer Attractiveness and Leadership: An Impetus. By Cornelius Riese. Frankfurter Allgemeine Buch. ISBN 978-3-96251-233-0. This book is a catalyst and a source of inspiration on how employer attractiveness and leadership can be organised both institutionally as well as individually and how it can be anchored in the company.

=== Other writings ===
- Marais, Anthony (2000). The Xenophobe's Guide to the Californians. Xenophobe's Guides. London: Oval Books. ISBN 1-902825-20-9. The Xenophobe’s Guide to the Californians is a "frank, irreverent, and funny" guide to understanding the Californians which shows the quirks of personality that set them apart from the rest of the Americans.
- Marais, Anthony (2008). Delusionism. Newport Beach, California: Balneum Books. ISBN 978-0-9774792-1-4. Delusionism is a collection of essays which take an irreverent look at life philosophy – in particular, the nature/nurture debate and art theory. Marais emphasizes the importance of the group in survival, claims that culture is born of delusion, and advocates a return to romanticism in art.
- Marais, Anthony; Frankfurt Writers Group (2009). A Place Between Worlds. Schwalbach, Germany: Fairmount Publishing. ISBN 978-3-940280-04-6. A collection of essays, fiction, and poetry, bound by the city and the shared experience of emigration – impressions dealing with the adventure, loss, and the enrichment of cultural change.
- Marais, Anthony; The Frankfurt Writer's Group (2012). Loose Change. Limerick, Ireland: RealTime Publishing. ISBN 978-1849611794. The short stories and reflections in this compilation are all loosely connected with change, whether geographical or emotional.
- Marais, Anthony (2013). People from Hollywood, Los Angeles. General Books LLC. ISBN 978-1-23080-680-8.
