= Havelock Work =

The Havelock Work was an arts and spirituality movement in the small town of Havelock North, New Zealand, begun in 1907 by Reginald and Ruth Gardiner and Harold Large, and later embraced by the whole town. It culminated in the founding of the Smaragdum Thalasses temple, better known as the Whare Ra, the longest-standing temple of the Stella Matutina magical order.

== Beginnings ==
In 1908 a meeting of over 100 people was held to discuss cultural affairs in nearby Frimley, with Reginald Gardner as one of the main speakers, resulting in the commencement of the "Havelock Work". The first meetings in 1908 were attended by only half a dozen to a dozen people and consisted of readings from Shakespeare and Dickens in a church schoolroom. From this developed social afternoons and Wednesday night talent shows, then carving and drama classes, flower and fruit shows and arts and crafts exhibitions. A morris dancing side was formed by school children, the first in the country.

== Festivals ==
A series of elaborate festivals were held. In 1911 the Old English Village Fete was held, opening with a procession of over 100 men, women and children in medieval costume and carrying banners. "King Arthur" and his court presided over morris and folk dances, tourneys and playlets, and there were stalls selling refreshments and crafts. In 1912 an even more elaborate Shakespearean Pageant was held, opening with a grand procession including "Queen Elizabeth" and her court and retinue, as well as "Shakespeare" and his group of players. Entertainments included teas and games, sixteenth century songs and dances, music by the Hastings Town Band and other concerts, a production of Much Ado About Nothing, scenes from Twelfth Night and The Merchant of Venice, and Shakespearean games. That weekend a ball was held in Shakespearean costume.

== Magazine ==
A magazine called The Forerunner was produced, with its first issue in 1909-03-01. It contained numerous spiritually-inclined and often Theosophically-inspired articles. The first issue stated "We all seek expression for the ideals that well up from time to time from the deeps of our eternal self". Describing the festivities, an article in one issue stated that "they aimed at cultivating a feeling for what is beautiful and true"; "behind the outward manifestation of things lay the ideal"; and "it is by the 'power of harmony and the deep power of joy that we see into the life of things'".

The three prime organisers of the Work, the Gardiners and Harold Large, believed that eastern methods of spiritual training such as Theosophy were unsuitable for westerners, but also felt that the Church had lost the esoteric teachings of Jesus and his disciples. They were determined to undergo rigorous training and initiation to merit learning those hidden teachings. These three were the prime organisers of many of the town's public events, and also meditated together on a daily basis, in which they were soon joined by Miss M. M. McLean and Reginald's sister, Miss Rose Gardiner. Reginald Gardiner considered the Havelock Work to be a cultural society "built around this silent power station". The meditation group grew, and began to incorporate simple ritual, calling itself the Society of the Southern Cross.

== Felkin and the Temple ==
In 1910 the Community of the Resurrection at Mirfield sent a mission of help to New Zealand, preaching and conducting retreats. One of the visiting priests was a Father Fitzgerald, whom Miss McLean had met in Britain, and she arranged for him to meet members of the Havelock prayer group. He agreed to be the director of their spiritual work from Britain. After a period of instruction, focussing on an esoteric approach to Christianity, Father Fitzgerald told the group that they had reached a level where personal instruction would be necessary, and he recommended a Dr. Robert Felkin for the task, who was the head of the Stella Matutina. Within a week the group had cabled £300 passage, supplied by Maurice Chambers and his father, Mason, and his uncle John, for Felkin and his family to visit New Zealand for three months. During this visit in 1912 Dr Felkin established the Smaragdum Thalasses Temple of the Stella Matutina, and later emigrated permanently to NZ in 1916, when he took up the day-to-day running of the Temple until his death in 1926.

== Whare Ra ==
The New Zealand Order became known by the Māori name of Whare Ra or "the House of the Sun". Foundations of the house at Whare Ra were laid down by the architect James Chapman-Taylor, who later became a member of both the Golden Dawn and the Order of the Table Round (Ordo Tabulae Rotundae), a neo-Arthurian mystical and chivalric order also brought to New Zealand by Felkin.

The Whare Ra attracted many members of the community, and by 1926 the inner order alone had over 100 members including many of the most wealthy and influential people in Havelock North and Hastings. The outer order numbered over 200 at its peak. It continued to operate until 1978.

Another outcome of the Havelock Work, albeit via Whare Ra, was the establishment in 1938 of the Tauhara Trust, which set aside money for the development of a conference centre for spiritual groups, particularly those engaging in meditation, mysticism, the New Age and deep ecology. This conference centre continues to operate, overlooking Acacia Bay in Taupō.
