= Baháʼí Faith in New Zealand =

The history of the Bahá’í Faith in New Zealand first appeared the public record in 1846 in newspapers, but meaningful contact began in the early 1900s as individual New Zealanders encountered Bahá’ís abroad or through print. Wilhelmina Sherriff Bainwas one, publishing a detailed 1908 article after learning of the religion through overseas contacts. By the 1910s, several New Zealanders were corresponding with ʻAbdu'l-Bahá, then head of the religion, and figures such as Robert Felkin—who had met ʻAbdu’l‑Bahá in London—moved to New Zealand and helped introduce the teachings. The first known Bahá’í to reside in the country was Dorothea Spinney in 1912, and by 1913 both Felkin and Margaret Stevenson had appeared as active members of the religion in the country, with Stevenson becoming a lifelong advocate.

Through the 1920s–1960s, the community expanded steadily. Stevenson and others undertook Bahá'í pilgrimage, helped launch the Herald of the South Bahá'í newsletter, and established the first Local Spiritual Assemblies, the local governing institutions of the religion. Visits from prominent Bahá’ís—including Martha Root, Keith Ransom-Kehler, and several other Hands of the Cause—strengthened the young community. By 1957, New Zealand elected its own National Spiritual Assembly, and by 1963, it had multiple Assemblies and smaller groups across both islands. The community also became more diverse, with the first Māori believer joining in 1948 and later waves of Persian Bahá’í refugees settling in the country during the 1980s.

From the 1970s onward, the Bahá’í community deepened its involvement in social and economic development, interfaith work, and national conversations on race relations. New Zealand Bahá’ís helped support Iranian refugees, launched local development initiatives, and collaborated with government agencies—most notably in establishing Race Unity Day in 1998. The community also navigated internal challenges, such as controversies over burial practices with its Māori members, and misunderstandings about women’s roles, while continuing to grow and diversify. By the 2000s, Bahá’ís were active in media, interfaith councils, disaster memorials, and regional gatherings, with census and independent estimates placing the population between roughly 2,800 and 7,400 believers across more than 65 local communities.

== Earlist history ==
The first mention of events related to the history of the Baháʼí Faith( and its precursor, the Bábí Faith,) in New Zealand appeared in a Wellington newspaper in July 1846. There was followup coverage of controversial news in Persia that reached New Zealand in 1853. There were several contacts between New Zealanders and Baháʼís at the beginning of the 20th century. Ongoing communication began around 1904 when one individual after another came in contact with Baháʼís and some of these individuals published articles in the print media in New Zealand as early as 1907, 1908, when New Zealander Wilhelmina Sherriff Bain wrote a decidely positive review of the religion. She may have met Sarah Jane Farmer, a notable Baháʼí in the United States, (see Green Acre Baháʼí School) in 1904. Whoever her contact was, Bain had authored a large detailed article in the Otago Witness published edition of 30 December 1908 about the religion. Other articles followed in 1909, 1911, and 1913. Other articles were published as well. It is also known that letters were exchanged in 1910 between a Mildred Burdon of Geraldine and ʻAbdu'l-Bahá. Robert Felkin, who had met ʻAbdu'l-Bahá, the Son of Bahá'u’lláh, the Founder of the Baháʼí Faith, in London in 1911, moved to New Zealand in 1912 where he helped found the Whare Ra. He wrote an article for a New Zealand publication which was published.

The first Baháʼí in the Antipodes was Dorothea Spinney who arrived in Auckland, from New York, in 1912. Shortly thereafter – about 1913 – there were two converts. They were Robert Felkin, who is considered to be a Baháʼí by 1914 and Margaret Stevenson who first heard of the religion in 1911 and who, by her own testimony, was a Baháʼí in 1913. Auckland resident Margaret Stevenson's interest was aroused when her sister, Amy, living in the United Kingdom, sent her a copy of "The Christian Commonwealth" which had reported on ʻAbdu'l-Bahá's speech in London on 27 March 1911. Stevenson followed up her interest in the prophet and His teachings and subscribed to a Baháʼí magazine published in the United States. According to the claims of the Baháʼí Faith, she found, God reveals himself through prophets who appear at various stages in history, and that the most recent of these was Bahá'u’lláh. Followers stress the oneness of all people: “The earth is but one country, and mankind its citizens. It is not for him to pride himself who loveth his own country, but rather for him who loveth the whole world”. Stevenson became a believer, and devoted the rest of her life to the service of the Baháʼí Faith.

== Growth of the community ==
Cities with Assemblies or smaller groups of Baháʼís in the North Island in 1963

'Abdu'l-Bahá wrote a series of letters, or tablets, to the Bahá'ís of the United States and Canada in 1916–1917. These letters were published in book form titled the Tablets of the Divine Plan. The seventh of these tablets, written on 11 April 1916, was the first to mention New Zealand. “The moment this divine Message is carried forward by the American believers .......and is propagated through the continents .........Then will all the peoples of the world witness that this community is spiritually illumined and divinely guided......... if some teachers go to other islands and other parts, such as the continent of Australia, New Zealand, Tasmania, ......most great results will be forthcoming”.

These tablets were translated and published in the magazine Star of the West on 12 December 1919. Stevenson was visited by Australian community founders John and Clara Hyde-Dunn in both 1922 and 1923 and the New Zealand community quickly grew. New adherents included Stevenson's sisters Amy and Lilias. In 1924 Martha Root shared the news that Shoghi Effendi, then head of the Baha’i religion, would receive Baháʼís of New Zealand who wished to undertake pilgrimage. 1924 was also the year in which the first pioneer from New Zealand, Nora Lee, moved to Fiji. The first Baháʼí Local Spiritual Assembly of the country was attempted in 1923 or 1924.

In 1925, Stevenson and two other New Zealand converts joined with a contingent from Australia for a year-long trip. They first went on pilgrimage for 19 days in the Holy Land, and then visited with the community of the Baháʼí Faith in the United Kingdom. During their travels, the news journal of New Zealand and Australia, Herald of the South, was first published in Auckland; later, in 1931, publication was transferred to Adelaide, Australia.

On their return, they carried with them dust from the Tomb of Baháʼu'lláh, which was placed in New Zealand soil at Stevenson's home in a ceremony held on 14 February 1926.

Also, in 1926, the Baháʼís in Auckland elected their first Baháʼí Local Spiritual Assembly. By 1928 there were a total of seven such institutions in New Zealand and Australia. By 1940 there were 19 in total, and smaller groups of Baháʼís in 17 other locations. In 1931 the prominent Baháʼí Keith Ransom-Kehler, visited.

In 1934, Baháʼís of Australia and New Zealand elected a Regional National Assembly - there were three delegates from Auckland, three from Sydney and three from Adelaide. In 1947 Alvin and Gertrude Blum left the United States for New Zealand where they lived until 1953 when they pioneered to the Solomon Islands, and were named Knights of Baháʼu'lláh. In 1948, Albert White became the first person of Māori descent to accept the Baháʼí Faith. In 1949, the first Persian Baháʼí pioneer, Manoochehr Alaʼi, arrived as a student at Massey College. In 1953 the first standing Hand of the Cause, ʻAlí-Akbar Furútan, visited New Zealand.

Cities with Assemblies or smaller groups of Baháʼís in the South Island in 1963

In 1957, the New Zealand community held its first independent National Convention to elect its own National Spiritual Assembly with three delegates from Auckland and two each from Devonport, New Plymouth and Wellington.

In 1958, Hand of the Cause of God, Enoch Olinga visited the Ngāruawāhia Marae and talked with elders. Four years later, when Hand of the Cause of God, Dr Muhajir visited, Ephraim Te Paa, a Kaumatua (Māori elder) from Ahipara joined the religion. In 1963, at the time of the election of the first Universal House of Justice, there were four Assemblies - Auckland, Devonport, Hamilton, Wellington – and 18 localities with smaller groups of Baháʼís.

The members of the New Zealand National Spiritual Assembly, who participated in the convention for the first election of the Universal House of Justice, were: Hugh Blundell, John Carr, Margaret Harnish, Linda Hight, Percy Leadley, Phyllis Milne, Jean Simmons, Douglas Weeks, and Terry Stirling.

=== Growth since the 1970s ===
In 1979, the New Zealand Baháʼí community came to the assistance of refugees to this country who were escaping from the persecution of Baháʼís in Iran . Later, between 1987 and 1989, some 142 Iranian Baháʼís settled in New Zealand.

Since its inception the religion has had involvement in socio-economic development beginning by giving greater freedom to women, promulgating the promotion of female education as a priority concern, and that involvement was given practical expression by creating schools, agricultural coops, and clinics. The religion entered a new phase of activity when a message of the Universal House of Justice dated 20 October 1983 was released. Baháʼís were urged to seek out ways, compatible with the Baháʼí teachings, in which they could become involved in the social and economic development of the communities in which they lived. Worldwide in 1979, there were 129 officially recognised Baháʼí socio-economic development projects. By 1987, the number of officially recognised development projects had increased to 1482. In the modern Baháʼí community of New Zealand the Baháʼís have multiplied their interests internally and externally. Aside from major themes there have also been individual work done in variety of topics – for example post-traumatic stress syndrome. Additionally the community has continued to advocate with the New Zealand government to speak up on behalf of the persecuted Baháʼís in Iran.

== Race relations ==
In 1997 the Baháʼí community approached the Race Relations Conciliator with a project to honour the memory of Hedi Moani, an Iranian-born Baháʼí who worked to promote positive race relations. Discussions took place over many months and on 10 December 1998 (Human Rights Day), the Race Relations Office formally announced that Race Unity Day would be celebrated in New Zealand on 21 March each year. The first awards were in 2001. There are reviews of speeches in 2007, 2008, and 2009. National coverage of events with the police was affirmed in 2008. In addition to national-scale events various localities have had local competitions – an example was the observance in Whangārei and Lower Hutt in 2009. In 2012 then 13-year-old Rima Shenoy submitted a video that won first place in the Race Unity Speech Awards of the New Zealand Police and the Baháʼís.

== Development ==
As the Baháʼí community has grown in size and complexity it has also run into controversies and survived. In the 1980s there was a controversy about the status of women not being electable to the Universal House of Justice. In 1989 there was a controversy over the burial of a Māori Baháʼí, Pakaka Tawhai. Though the National Assembly had consulted with Tawhai's wife about burial, Pakaka's tribal family, the Ngati Porou, confronted the Baháʼís during the tangihanga, demanding to take his body back to Ruatoria. Ultimately they failed. Then member of the Universal House of Justice Peter Khan spoke at a conference in New Zealand in 2000, noting that the Universal House of Justice had received letters "written in distasteful language" from New Zealand – he encouraged systematic education of children, application of a moral life, a serious study of the Covenant of Baháʼu'lláh, and study of the writings of Shoghi Effendi.

Beyond controversies, the Baháʼís in New Zealand have broadened their interests both through individual initiatives and collective action. In 1991 an assembly was elected in the Kāpiti Coast District. In 2000 two Baháʼí pioneers from New Zealand settled in Pitcairn Islands, one of the few nations on earth that had no Baháʼí presence. In 2006 Baháʼís helped dedicate the temporary Spiritual Centre at Middlemore Hospital. In 2007 Dunedin Baháʼís had been granted access to a community centre. The Universal House of Justice called for a regional conference for the Baháʼís from New Zealand, the Cook Islands, Fiji, Hawaii, Kiribati, New Caledonia and the Loyalty Islands, Samoa, Tonga, Tuvalu, and Vanuatu to be held in Auckland's Manukau City, on the sacred grounds of their marae, in 2008 and it came to pass in February 2009. The Baháʼí on Air television show is broadcast weekly on Auckland's Triangle TV which also covers the Cook Islands, American Samoa, and Adelaide, Australia. There has also been an independent documentary by a non-Baháʼí New Zealander exploring the religion in 2007. In 2011 Baháʼís participated in the community memorial for those who had died in the 2011 Christchurch earthquake. It was mentioned in a review of spirituality in business in 2012. The community in Tauranga invited the Baháʼís to join their interfaith council.

== Demographics ==
A 1999 report from the census bureau noted that of the citizens of New Zealand of Middle Eastern ethnicity, 4% were Baháʼí and 20% of the Baháʼís in New Zealand are members of some ethnic minority. The 1991 and 2006 New Zealand census reports about 2800 Baháʼís though the 1996 census listed just over 3100 Baháʼís. The Association of Religion Data Archives (relying mostly on the World Christian Encyclopedia) estimated some 7400 Baháʼís in 2005. There are more than 65 local Baháʼí communities around New Zealand, the large city communities have hundreds of members and assemblies, while some rural areas having groups of just two or three Baháʼís. About 46 are full-fledged assemblies. The religion was called a "mainstream religion" by the International Union for Conservation of Nature.

=== Notable Baháʼís ===
The Bahá´í Association For the Arts and its publication Arts Dialogue has produced a lists of New Zealand Baháʼí artists, reviews of the shows and articles published dealing with New Zealand. The national assembly posted profiles of some Baháʼís in 2011.

- Pax Assadi - New Zealand comedian and writer. Star of the TV comedy, drama seriers "Raised by Refugees".
- Barry Crump was a writer of semi-autobiographical comic novels who travelled widely and became a Baháʼí about 1982.
- Sheryl Davis works for a charitable trust focused on promoting economic development and tourism in the northern part of the country.
- Russell Garcia – Garcia is from Oakland, California and is a composer who has worked with major Hollywood artists and producers. Garcia and his wife Gina have been members of the Baháʼí Faith since 1955. In 1966 they set sail and ended up in the south Pacific when some musicians from Auckland, New Zealand invited Russell to do some live concerts, radio and television shows and to lecture at the various universities around the country on behalf of the New Zealand Broadcasting Commission and Music Trades Association. Russell, finished with his lectures and concerts and on advice of friends, drove up to the Bay of Islands in the north of North Island where they live.
- Tilly Hirst - Netball player.
- Ilona Rodgers - Film, stage and television actress.
- Heather Simpson is a District Court judge, enrolled in the Baháʼí community in 1983.
- Murray Robert Smith was a member of the New Zealand Parliament from 1972 to 1975. He later enrolled in the Baháʼí community and served on the national governing body for two years before he and his wife, Miette, began a period of service at the Baháʼí World Centre in Haifa, Israel, which lasted from 1994 to 2007. At the Baháʼí World Centre, Murray served as Deputy Secretary General of the Baháʼí International Community, a role centred on developing the Baháʼí community's contributions to wider society. Note government service is not proscribed, just partisan politics.
- Robin White (artist) - New Zealand painter and printmaker.
- Ken Zemke – Zemke was a freelance film editor working in Hollywood in 1972 when he became a Baháʼí after working on comedy TV series such as Hogan's Heroes and eventually won an Emmy in 1974, for an episode in the series Medical Story TV Series. However he and his wife soon moved to New Zealand in 1981 where he continued work in movie production – winning New Zealand Guild of Film and Television award for best editing for Came a Hot Friday while continuing to be involved with documentaries and projects associated with the Baháʼí Faith through individual initiative or commissioned as well as his own ongoing project – Baháʼí on Air.

== See also ==
- Religion in New Zealand
- History of New Zealand
- Baháʼí Faith in Australia
