= Havelock School =

Havelock is the name of several schools:

In England

- Havelock Academy, formerly Havelock School, in Grimsby

In Canada:

- Havelock Elementary School in New Brunswick

In New Zealand:

- Havelock School, New Zealand in Havelock, Marlborough
- Havelock North Primary School, Havelock North Intermediate and Havelock North High School in Havelock North.
