= Mabel Hodge =

New Zealand teacher and headmistress

- Born: 5 February 1862; Cheltenham, England
- Died: 15 October 1938 (aged 76); Te Awanga, New Zealand
- Occupations: Teacher and headmistress
- Known for: Founder of Woodford House
- Relatives: Merton Hodge (nephew)

Annie Mabel Hodge (5 February 1862 – 15 October 1938) was a New Zealand teacher and headmistress. Born in England, she founded Woodford House, a girls' boarding school in Havelock North.

== Early life and family ==
Hodge was born in Cheltenham, Gloucestershire, England on 5 February 1862. Around 1879 she began working as an assistant teacher at Woodford House School in Croydon. Before her father's death in the late 1880s, she also spent two or three years teaching in Germany. She had three brothers, and her nephew, Merton Hodge, was a playwright.

== Woodford House ==
After her father's death, two of Hodge's brothers moved to New Zealand, where one of them began to work as an engineer in Hastings, Hawke's Bay. In late 1893, Hodge, her mother and younger brother moved to New Zealand, and in 1894, Hodge established Woodford House, a school for both boarding and day students, in a house in Hastings.

At the time of opening, the school had 22 students (including four boarding students) and four other teachers. Through Hodge's promotional efforts, the roll increased to 85 students by 1905, and in 1911 the school moved to a larger site in Havelock North. William Nelson assisted Hodge in the move.

Hodge retired as school headmistress in 1922, and in 1933 established the Woodford House Old Girls' Association. She also travelled overseas during her retirement.

Hodge died at Te Awanga on 15 October 1938. A memorial service attended by many former staff and students of Woodford House was held at St Luke's Church in Havelock North. An obituary in The Evening Post said that Hodge's "lovable personality and the spirituality of her nature made her ideally fitted to be a teacher"; the Hawke's Bay Herald-Tribune noted that Woodford House was "almost her sole interest in life" and that she was "never happier than when entertaining old girls".
