= Robert William Felkin =

British medical missionary, explorer and ceremonial magician (1853–1926)

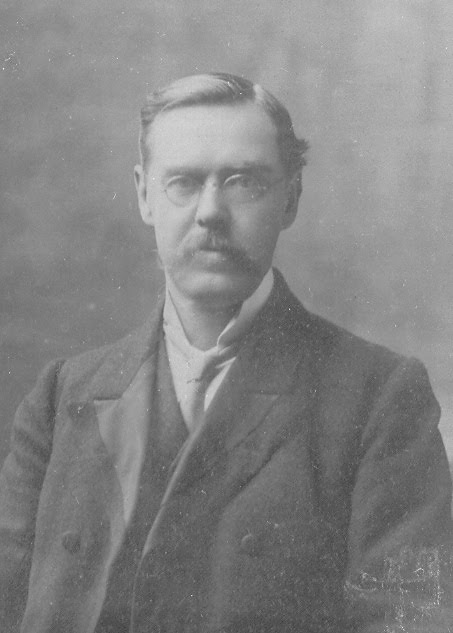
- Born: 13 March 1853; Nottingham, England
- Died: 28 December 1926 (aged 73); Havelock North, New Zealand
- Occupations: Medical Missionary and Explorer; Ceremonial Magician
- Spouse(s): Mary Mander; Harriet
- Children: Ethelwyn Mary Felkin, Samuel Denys Felkin, Laurence Felkin
- Parent: Robert Felkin Sr.

Robert William Felkin FRSE LRCSE LRCP (13 March 1853 – 28 December 1926) was a British medical missionary and explorer, a ceremonial magician, member of the S.R.I.A, member of the Hermetic Order of the Golden Dawn, a prolific author on Uganda and Central Africa, and early anthropologist, with an interest in hypnotism, ethno-medicine and tropical diseases.

He was the founder in 1903 of the Stella Matutina, a new Order based on the original Order of the Golden Dawn, with its Hermes Temple in Bristol, UK and, later, Whare Ra (or more correctly, the Smaragdum Thallasses Temple) in Havelock North, New Zealand in 1912.

The fullest account of his life is found in A Wayfaring Man, a fictionalised biography written by his second wife Harriot and published in serial form between 1936 and 1949.

== Early life ==
Robert William Felkin was born in Beeston, Nottinghamshire, on 13 March 1853, the son of Robert Felkin (1828–1899), a Nonconformist lace manufacturer. His grandfather, William Felkin (1795–1874), son of a Baptist minister, remains one of the best known names in the Victorian lace industry and was mayor of Nottingham in 1851, when he exhibited at the Great Exhibition. But he overreached, and the business failed disastrously in 1864, when Felkin retired to write standard works on the lace and hosiery trades. His son and partner Robert Felkin Sr settled in Wolverhampton to take up a position as manager of the home department of Mander Brothers, varnish manufacturers. Robert Jr was educated at Wolverhampton Grammar School, where he met the explorer David Livingstone, who inspired him to become a medical missionary.

== Medical missionary in Africa ==
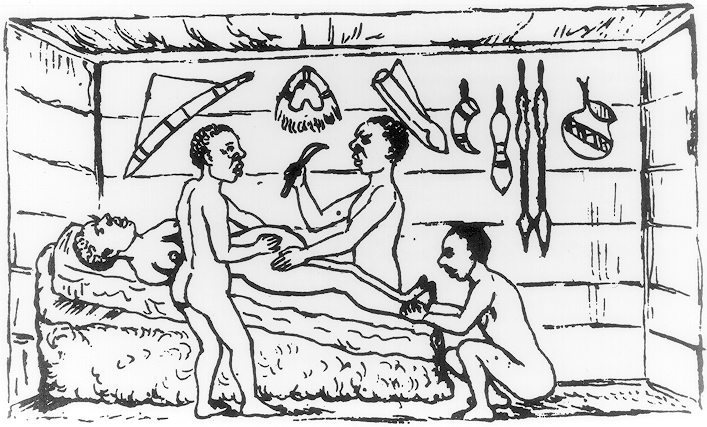
A caesarean section performed by indigenous healers in Kahura, Uganda. As observed by Felkin in 1879.

He worked for a period in Chemnitz, Germany, after his schooling, where his uncle Henry Felkin lived, and became fluent in the language. In about 1876 he began studying medicine at the University of Edinburgh. In 1878, as yet unlicensed, he joined a mission led by the Church Missionary Society to Central Africa. He travelled up the Nile to Khartoum, where he met General Gordon, and then on through what was then wild and unmapped country to the African Great Lakes. Eventually he spent two years in Africa, and became personal physician to King Muteesa, who had previously tried to kill him. In Zanzibar, he actively campaigned against the slave trade. He published several articles on tropical medicine and childbirth in medical journals, and also wrote Uganda and the Egyptian Soudan (1882, with C. T. Wilson), Egypt Present and To Come (1885), Uganda (1886), and other African works.

In 1881, he returned to Edinburgh when his health deteriorated to complete his medical studies (LRCP, LRCS, Ed, 1884). While still a medical student he became a Fellow of the Royal Society of Edinburgh, a Fellow of the Royal Geographical Society, a member of the Anthropological Institute of Great Britain and a corresponding Fellow of the Berlin Anthropological Society.

== First marriage and medical practice ==
In 1882, Felkin married his first wife, Mary ("Polly"), daughter of Samuel Small Mander of Wolverhampton, his father's employer, who had been a friend since childhood, and became a collaborator in both his esoteric work and his work for child welfare. They had a son (Samuel) Denys and a daughter, Ethelwyn (1883–1962), who was to publish on the legacy of the Golden Dawn under the name "Ethel Felkin".

In 1884, he studied further in Marburg, acquiring his M.D. there in 1885. Following this he practiced as a doctor in Edinburgh for some years, returning to Africa and travelling frequently with his wife in Europe. He was appointed as a senior lecturer in tropical medicine in Edinburgh in 1886. In 1889, Dr Joseph Bell suggested that he investigate hypnotism by reviewing Charles Lloyd Tuckey's Psycho-Therapeutics. This prompted him to visit the Amsterdam Psychotherapeutic Clinic of Frederik van Eeden and Albert van Renterghem in Holland. He reviewed the European literature on hypnotism in a short book called 'Hypnotism or Psycho-Therapeutics', acknowledging Tuckey's contributions in his choice of title and in the foreword. He is considered one of the 'New Hypnotists', a small group of English physicians who promoted hypnotism in the era. His work in hypnotism influenced both his medical practice and his esoteric leanings.

== Theosophy and the Golden Dawn ==
Mary and Robert seem to have been introduced to esotericism through a Bible study circle they joined in Edinburgh; other scriptures were discussed, including the Tao te ching and the Bhagavad Gita, and some members of the group were Theosophists. Robert and Mary joined the Theosophical Society in Edinburgh in 1886, but found it lacking in terms of ritual, and eventually joined John William Brodie-Innes' Amen-Ra Temple of the Hermetic Order of the Golden Dawn on 12 March 1894.

He continued to write and publish: he edited (with others) a collection of the letters and journals of Mehmet Emin Pasha, whom he had met (translated by Mary), which appeared in 1888. Following a breakdown from strain and overwork he transferred his practice to London in 1896.

In 1903 Mary died and Robert reinforced his commitment to both Anglican Christianity and occultism. He made a retreat at the monastery of the Mirfield fathers, the Community of the Resurrection, and considered joining the order. Several of the Mirfield fathers had an interest in Rosicrucian and Golden Dawn Christian mysticism, and regarded Felkin as an eminent figure in that tradition. One of these priests, Father Fitzgerald, would later play a key role in bring Felkin to New Zealand.

Also in 1903, a schism occurred within the Order of the Golden Dawn, when Felkin and Brodie-Innes split from A.E. Waite to form the magically inclined Order of the Stella Matutina. The poet W. B. Yeats joined the Stella Matutina and was a member for 20 years. Felkin's main temple in London was called Amoun.

== The Sun Masters ==
From the time that Felkin assumed leadership of the Stella Matutina, he came increasingly under the influence of the "Sun Masters", the fabled Secret Chiefs of the Order, and other supposed adepts on the astral plane. Having these supposed contacts reinforced his position as leader in the order. Around 1908, he also claimed to have contacted an "Arab Teacher" called Ara Ben Shemesh ("Lion Son of the Sun"), one of the "Sons of Fire" inhabiting a Near Eastern "temple in the desert", who had been given special permission to contact and teach Western students. His first contact with Ara Ben Shemesh seems to be recounted in A Wayfaring Man, which describes how a conversation between Felkin and Waite was interrupted by the appearance of a "shadowy presence". Felkin called for Harriot, who was clairvoyant, and she saw "a tall man in Eastern dress, kuftan, galabieh, and turban. He has a smooth olive face, and large dark eyes". Apparently this figure, described in the account as "the Chaldean", was seeking someone to help in uniting Eastern and Western teaching. Upon learning that he "believed in the Lord Jesus Christ", Felkin and Waite agreed to collaborate with him.

Another mystical teacher was Sri Parananda, whom Felkin claimed to have first seen materialising out of steam at the Bad Pyrmont baths in Germany. This apparition, described as a dark Eastern man with a beard and large black eyes, wearing a flowing robe and a peculiar conical cap, arranged with Felkin to meet him in exactly one month in the lounge of the Carlton Hotel in London. According to Felkin their subsequent meeting in the flesh was the start of a series of conversations that lasted for several years.

== Freemasonry and Rosicrucianism ==
Felkin was initiated into Freemasonry in Mary Chapel Lodge, Edinburgh, on 8 January 1907, was passed to the Fellow Craft degree on 12 February and raised to Master Mason on 26 February. On 11 April, he was admitted to the Societas Rosicruciana in Anglia (SRIA), Metropolitan College, to which only Master Masons are admitted. The officiating celebrant was Dr. W. Wynn Westcott, Supreme Magus of that society and co-founder of the Golden Dawn.

According to R. Ellwood, by the time Felkin first visited New Zealand in 1912 he was already a 32° Freemason, one of the highest to visit the country thus far. But according to K. Edney of the New Zealand SRIA, Felkin's interest in Freemasonry was probably slight; he was never Master of the Lodge nor joined the Holy Royal Arch, and it is unlikely that he joined any higher degrees; his motive for joining Freemasonry and the SRIA seems to have been to gain credibility with continental occultists and contact members of the original Rosicrucian society. Anna Sprengel, a member of this fabled German society of nearly god-like adepts, had allegedly warranted the founding of the Golden Dawn, and Felkin believed that she and her order still existed deep under cover in Germany, along with the tomb of Christian Rosencreutz. In search of this group he and Harriot travelled to Europe in 1906, 1910 and 1914, and on one of these trips he met with Rudolf Steiner and claimed to have contacted other Rosicrucian adepts. Felkin considered Steiner to be an extremely high initiate, and after their meeting incorporated elements of Anthroposophy into his practice, including homeopathy.

During their 1914 trip the Felkins, they became stranded in Germany when Britain declared war on Germany on 4 August. Harriot's fictionalised account of his life suggests that he had been sent there on an urgent mission by the "Sun Master" Ara Ben Shemesh, despite all warnings of impending war. They managed to avoid arrest, and escaped the country via the neutral Netherlands with the help of German Masons.

== New Zealand ==
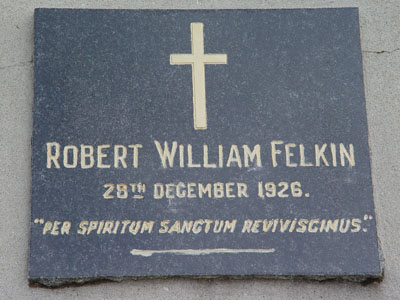
Felkin's grave

In 1912, Felkin, together with Harriot and Ethelwyn, visited Havelock North, New Zealand at the invitation of the Society of the Southern Cross. This was a prayer and meditation group closely involved with the "Havelock Work", an arts and spirituality movement embraced by the whole town. Reginald and Ruth Gardiner and Harold Large, founders of both the Havelock Work and the Society of the Southern Cross, believed that eastern methods of spiritual training such as Theosophy were unsuitable for westerners, but also felt that the Church had lost the esoteric teachings of Jesus and his disciples. They were determined to undergo rigorous training and initiation to merit learning those hidden teachings. These three had started daily meditations together, and were soon joined by Miss M. M. McLean and Reginald's sister, Miss Rose Gardiner. Reginald Gardiner considered the Havelock Work to be a cultural society "built around this silent power station". The meditation group grew, and began to incorporate simple ritual, calling itself the Society of the Southern Cross.

In 1910, the Mirfield Fathers sent a mission of help to New Zealand, preaching and conducting retreats. Miss McLean, who had met Father Fitzgerald in Britain, arranged for him to meet members of the Havelock prayer group, and he agreed to direct their spiritual work from Britain. He instructed them in an esoteric approach to Christianity, but soon decided they had reached a stage where personal instruction was necessary for further progress, and he recommended Dr. Robert Felkin for the task. Within a week the group had cabled £300 passage, supplied by Maurice Chambers and his father, Mason, and his uncle John, for Felkin, Harriot and Ethelwyn to visit New Zealand for three months. During this visit in 1912 Dr Felkin established the Smaragdum Thallasses Temple of the Stella Matutina. The New Zealand Order became known by the Maori name of Whare Ra or "the House of the Sun". Foundations of the house at Whare Ra were laid down by the architect James Chapman-Taylor, who later became a member of both the Golden Dawn and the Order of the Table Round (Ordo Tabulae Rotundae), a neo-Arthurian mystical and chivalric order also brought to New Zealand by Felkin.

Back in England in 1916, Felkin was appointed Inspector General of colonial colleges for the Societas Rosicruciana in Anglia, although he seems never to have functioned in this capacity. In that same year he also founded three more daughter-Temples of the Stella Matutina, together with a side-order, and claimed to found the Guild of St. Raphael. He published on the theme of 'Rosicrucian medicine' and, at the height of the German U-boat activity, emigrated permanently with his family to New Zealand, as his health broke down with recurrent malaria and other tropical diseases.

In September 1917, Felkin wrote to William Westcott, one of the two major founders of the Golden Dawn, that the Smaragdum Thallassess Temple had twenty members in the Second Order, thirty-four in the First Order, and ten people waiting to join.

Felkin became involved in the Baháʼí Faith, through his meeting with ʻAbdu'l-Bahá in London in 1911 at Lady Blomfield's. Felkin introduced Maurice Chambers to the Faith and presented him with two Baháʼí ring stones that Abdu'l-Baha had given him. Felkin may have had an article on the Baháʼí Faith published in a local newspaper, although there had been an earlier article by British Baha'i Alice Buckton published c. 1909 in the Havelock Journal "The Forerunner".

Felkin spent the rest of his life in New Zealand, where he continued to practise as a consulting physician as well as a magician between bouts of ill health. His strong personality and clinical acumen, combined with a kind and generous nature brought him patients from far afield, including Australia. On 28 December 1926, he died at Havelock North, and was buried in the Havelock North cemetery facing the Whare Ra, wearing the cloak, mantle and purple cross of a Knight of the Ordo Tabulae Rotundae. He was survived by his second wife Harriot, his daughter Ethelwyn, and two sons; Harriot and Ethelwyn were later buried with him.
