= William Alexander Ayton =

British Anglican clergyman

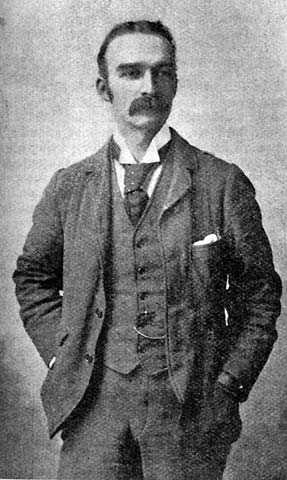
William Alexander Ayton

William Alexander Ayton (28 April 1816 – 1 January 1909) was a British Anglican clergyman with an interest in alchemy. He was Vicar of Chacombe (in Northamptonshire) from 1873 to 1894. In 1894 he retired on a small pension, and he died at Saffron Walden (in Essex) in 1909. He translated from Latin the life of John Dee written by Thomas Smith.

He is generally thought to have been a member of the shadowy Society of Eight founded in 1883. He became a member of the successor Order of the Golden Dawn. He was a supporter of the reforms of Arthur Edward Waite, which split the Order as the Holy Order of the Golden Dawn and the Stella Matutina.

Ayton became a vegetarian in 1868 after visiting the family of his friend Joseph Wallace. Ayton converted to Wallace's dietary system.
