= Plas Mawr, New Plymouth =

Arts and Crafts style cottage in New Zealand

Plas Mawr
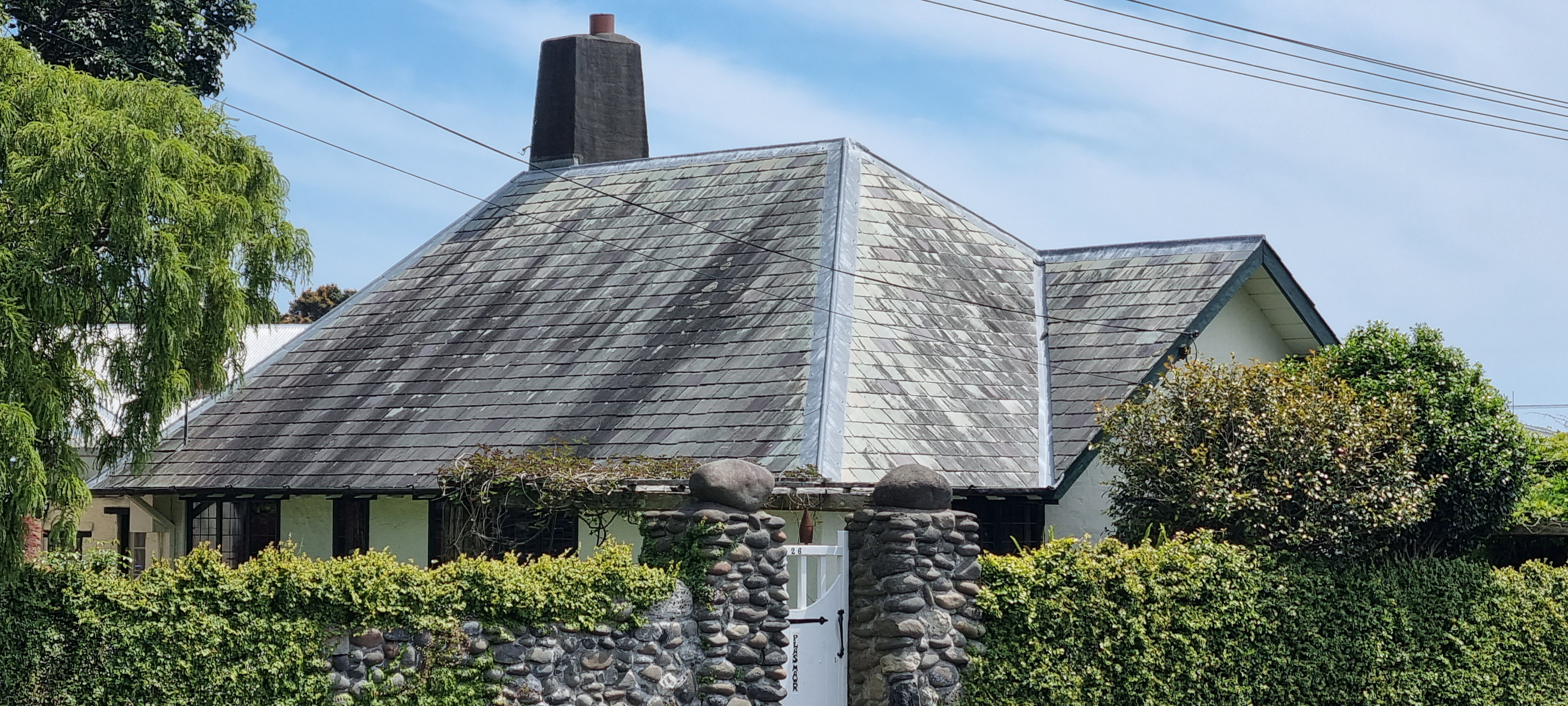
- Plas Mawr
- Interactive map of the Plas Mawr area

General information
- Architectural style: Arts and Crafts
- Location: 26 Standish Street and Wallace Place, New Plymouth, New Zealand
- Coordinates: 39.0657°S 174.0689°E
- Completed: 1913

Design and construction
- Architect: James Walter Chapman-Taylor

Heritage New Zealand – Category 1
- Designated: 16 November 1989
- Reference no.: 146

Plas Mawr is an Arts and Crafts style cottage in New Plymouth, New Zealand, designed and built by the local architect and builder James Walter Chapman-Taylor in 1913.

The name of the cottage translates from the Welsh language as "big hall" or "large manor house". It was designated as a Category 1 Historic Place by Heritage New Zealand in 1989.

== History ==
Plas Mawr was built for Charles Hayward Burgess, former mayor of New Plymouth from 1915 to 1919. The house was commissioned by his wife Ann and was completed in 1913.

Because of the small, triangular section where the house was to be built, it was difficult to find an architect who would design it. Eventually, it was the architect James Walter Chapman-Taylor, born in London and raised in New Zealand, who designed and built it. He was inspired by the Arts and Crafts movement's interpretation of rural English cottage construction and style, which was an attempt to revive traditional craft methods. After returning to New Zealand, Chapman-Taylor designed and built about 80 high-quality, hand-crafted homes, one of the first being the two-storey cottage Plas Mawr in New Plymouth.

The house was given the Welsh name Plas Mawr, translated variously as "great hall" or "large manor house" by Chapman-Taylor. It was designed to house two elderly people in comfort.

Designing the house, Chapman-Taylor developed a "sun-trap" plan, which he used later for many other houses. After the completion of Plas Mawr, Chapman-Taylor commented that "although house building is generally a trade, it can and should be an art".

The house was owned by the Burgess family for almost 42 years. After that it has had a number of owners, the majority of them being retired couples.

== Description ==
Built in the Arts and Crafts style, an expensive concept at the time, the two-storey house design required the inclusion of detailed quality, uncluttered woodworking and unique contemporary mechanisms.

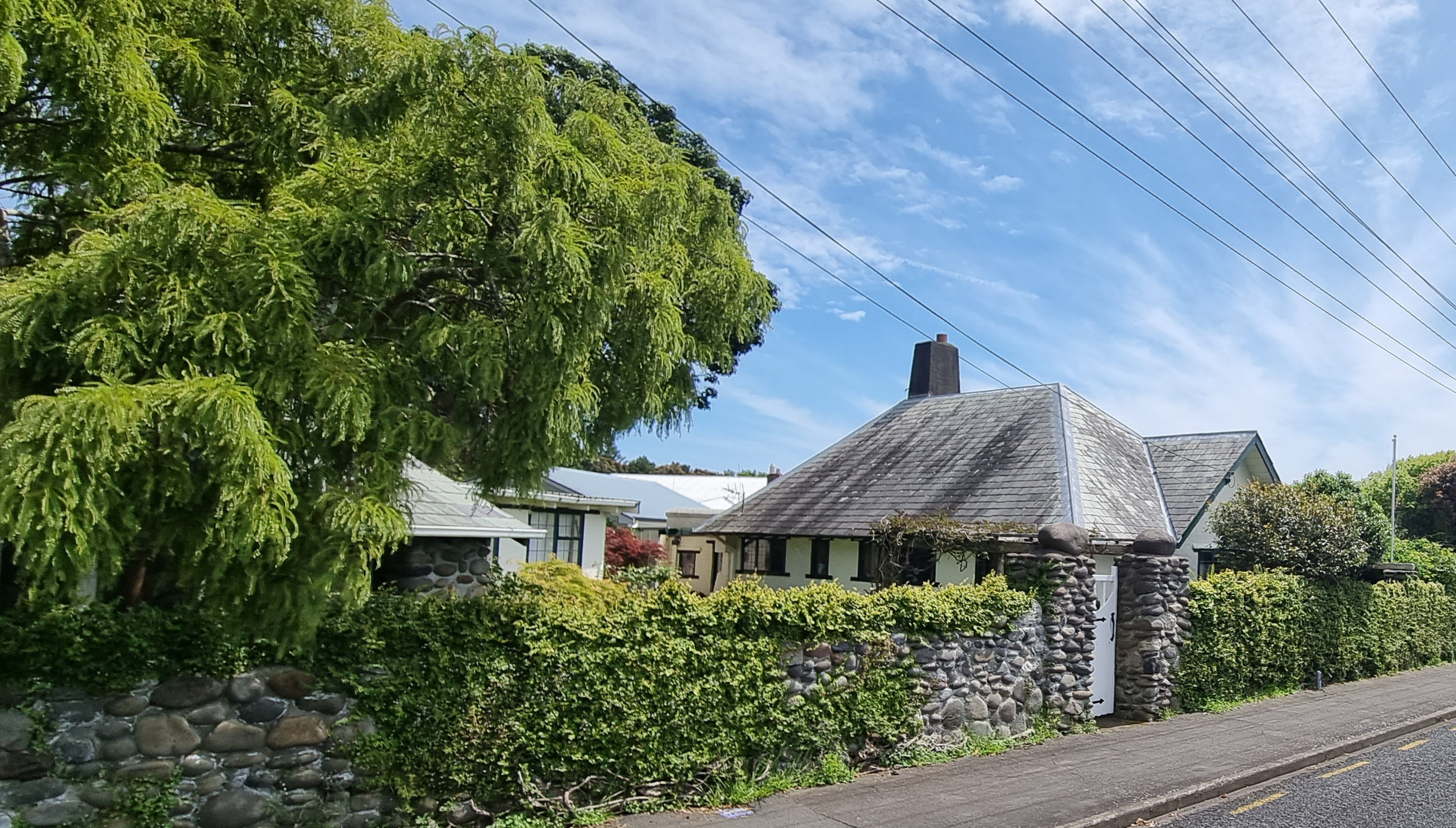
Plas Mawr

James Walter Chapman-Taylor, one of New Zealand's most important local architects of his time, was also a skilled craftsman, builder and furniture designer. He described the Plas Mawr as "a butterfly with two splayed wings". The house has an open L shape, fitted neatly into a corner of the property, leaving the rest free for a garden. Built of brick covered with white, trowel-stroked plaster, the cottage has a roof of slate tiles.

Inside, it features the hand-adzed jarrah wood and timber beams and hand-crafted built-in furniture typical of the Arts and Crafts style. The exposed timber beams of dark coloured jarrah contrast with the plastered white walls and the ceilings plastered as well between the beams. The house, which is well preserved, still features the hand-crafted, built-in timber shelves and seats characteristic of most of the Chapman-Taylor homes. The floor was made of concrete flagstones interleaved with small red tiles. The house has iron door hinges and window latches forged by hand.

== Bibliography ==
- Heritage New Zealand, New Zealand Heritage List
