= Herbert Sutcliffe (alternative health advocate) =

British psychologist and New Thought teacher

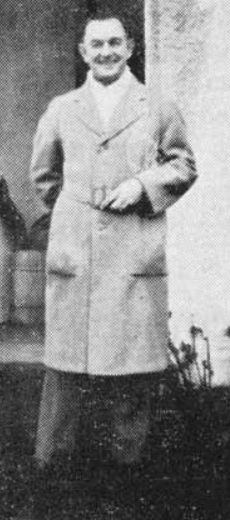
- Born: 19 October 1886; Louth, Lincolnshire, England
- Died: 27 October 1971 (aged 85); Havelock North, New Zealand
- Occupations: Psychologist, new thought teacher

Herbert Sutcliffe (19 October 1886 – 27 October 1971) was an English psychologist, alternative health advocate and New Thought teacher. He founded a proto-New Age movement called the School of Radiant Living. Many of Sutcliffe's ideas about health were pseudoscientific.

== Biography ==
Sutcliffe was born in Louth, Lincolnshire, England, in 1886. Sutcliffe edited the Australian Psychological Society's magazine and was its president (1925–1930). He obtained a PhD in psychology, in 1931.

He married Hilda Gertrude Wilson in Brunswick on 5 June 1915. Hilda died in Australia in 1944 and in 1955 Herbert married his secretary, Phyllis Evelyn Farley, in Hastings, New Zealand. He took interest in homoeopathy and vitamin therapy.

Sutcliffe bought a large house in Havelock North with around 26 acres (11 hectares) of land and lived there with his family and it became the headquarters of his Radiant Living organisation. He named it "Peloha" from the three words peace, love and harmony. He died at Havelock North on 27 October 1971.

He was survived by Phyllis and the children of his first marriage. Phyllis ran Peloha until her death in 1981 when it was sold to Weleda, a manufacturer of herbal remedies and it is still their New Zealand headquarters. Following the sale, a large endowment was made to Victoria University of Wellington to establish the Herbert Sutcliffe scholarships for disadvantaged students in 1989. Other educational institutions, such as the Hohepa homes which assists children with learning difficulties, were also given endowments.

== Radiant Living ==
He founded a proto-New Age movement called the School of Radiant Living. It took influence from Christianity, new thought and transcendentalism. Sutcliffe's most famous student was a young Edmund Hillary. Hillary's whole family were involved in the Auckland school and Hillary himself trained and qualified as a teacher and went on to assist Sutcliffe and worked at the school from 1938 to 1943.

The philosophy of Radiant Living argued that each person has a soul and for successful psychoanalysis the relationship between mind and soul must be explored. Sutcliffe established the first School of Radiant Living in Providence, Rhode Island, in 1931. During the next two decades Sutcliffe set up 36 schools in the United States, Canada, Hong Kong, Australia and New Zealand.

Sutcliffe was influenced by Carl Jung and developed a metaphysical system which taught that mental health was the key to better physical health. He held a holistic view of nature and diet played an important role in his teachings. He developed a fad diet known as the "eliminating diet" combined with exercise and prayer. His diet based on food combining principles emphasised the consumption of fresh fruit, vegetables and what he termed "potassium broth". Sutcliffe was not a vegetarian, but meat was rarely eaten. Sutcliffe believed that vegetables should consist of 80% of the diet as they are "alkaline forming" and the remaining 20% should be proteins, carbohydrates and fats which are "acid forming".

== Selected publications ==
- How to Re-Make Your Life (1931)
- Radiant Living: Summary of Course of Instruction in Psycho-Cosmology (1951)
