= Stella Matutina =

Occult organisation

The Stella Matutina (Morning Star) was an initiatory magical order dedicated to the dissemination of the traditional occult teachings of the earlier Hermetic Order of the Golden Dawn. Originally, the outer order of the Stella Matutina was known as Mystic Rose or Order of the M.R. in the Outer. When occult writer Israel Regardie released documents of the Golden Dawn to the public it was the teachings of the Stella Matutina that he revealed, not those of the original order. The Stella Matutina was one of several daughter organisations into which the Hermetic Order of the Golden Dawn fragmented, including the Alpha et Omega led by John William Brodie-Innes and Macgregor Mathers, the Isis-Urania Temple led by A. E. Waite, and others.

== Origins ==
After a revolt of London Adepts against the then-head of the Order (Samuel MacGregor Mathers) in early 1900, the Order segmented into two new groups. Those who remained loyal to Mathers took on the name Alpha et Omega, while the London group took on the name Hermetic Society of the Morgenrothe. The latter group retained such members as Robert Felkin (a British doctor), John William Brodie-Innes, A. E. Waite, William Alexander Ayton, W. B. Yeats and others.

The Morgenrothe had a very short existence before it, too, schismed into two groups. Those who were most interested in Christian Mysticism (led by A. E. Waite) took over the remnants of Isis-Urania, and formed the Independent and Rectified Rite of the Golden Dawn, and later the Fellowship of the Rosy Cross. Those from the Morgenrothe who were more interested in occultism (led by Dr. Felkin) formed the group "Stella Matutina" – naming their Mother Temple "Amoun".

The outer order was changed by Dr. Felkin and other members of the Golden Dawn based in London. Among others who helped form Stella Matutina was J. W. Brodie-Innes, though he soon made peace with Mathers and left for the Alpha et Omega.

The first gesture of independence brought a committee of twelve to govern for a year. Further developments forced them to realise that this was far from satisfactory. With pettiness and further dispute, they abandoned every reform and went back to the original scheme of appointing three chiefs to lead and govern them.

While visiting New Zealand in 1912, Dr. Felkin issued a Warrant for the Smaragdum Thallasses Temple No. 49 (commonly referred to as Whare Ra (Māori for "House of the Sun")), which operated in the basement of his purpose built home at Havelock North, in the Hawke's Bay Region. Felkin's visit was closely associated with the New Zealand Province of the Societas Rosicruciana. The stay was supposed to be permanent, but Meakin, who was to take over as chief of the Amoun Temple, died in the autumn of 1912. Felkin returned to England, but moved to New Zealand permanently in 1916.

During the next few years, Felkin established Hermes Lodge in Bristol, the Secret College in London, and Merlin Lodge, also in London.

The Amoun Temple of the Stella Matutina in London closed its doors in 1919 due to two members developing schizophrenia, one of whom, a clergyman, was later to die in a mental institution.

In 1933, Israel Regardie joined the Hermes Temple in Bristol, and resigned from Amoun Temple in 1934, finding it, according to him, in a state of low morale and decay. Many of the original Golden Dawn's Knowledge Lectures had been "removed or heavily amended, largely because they were beyond the capacity of the chiefs". These same chiefs claimed "extraordinarily exalted" grades, but Regardie found them lacking. As an example, he recounted that no one in the temple knew how to play Enochian chess, in fact the Order's chess set had never been used. He constructed his own boards and he challenged his superiors in the Order to play: all refused with excuses.

By 1939, Stella Matutina became largely dormant, although the Hermes Temple continued until 1970. Whare Ra in New Zealand continued until 1978.

== Asserting independence ==
From the very beginning, Felkin believed that the Order must in fact gain contact with the Secret Chiefs by the use of astral work and communications which were received through either trance or automatic writing, as well as his wish that there should be unity among the Rosicrucians. Great importance was given to these messages, which were coming in considerable numbers, some of which gave approval to make changes to the rituals. Felkin constructed new rituals for the Stella Matutina, which included Adeptus Major, Adeptus Exemptus, and Magister Templi, all of which bear resemblance to the original Fourth, Fifth and Sixth Degree rituals of Ordo Templi Orientis before they were rewritten by Aleister Crowley.

At this point, according to Francis King, the chiefs of the Amoun Temple were addicted to mediumship and astral travel. Their interpretation of the Golden Dawn techniques of astral projection and travel appears to have been derived from Florence Farr's Sphere group.

There were two main astral entities contacted. The first group were Rosicrucian, in which at times the medium believed to be controlled by Christian Rosenkreuz himself. The second were called Arabs, said to be the teachers of the Rosicrucians. The orders given by these "Arabs" had a substantial effect on the policies. For example, instructions received on January 9, 1915, was put into effect by the foundation of the Anglican spiritual healers organisation called the Guild of St. Raphael, as Francis King notes, "were almost without exception, members of the Stella Matutina". Recent documentary evidence, however, suggests King may have been mistaken and the Guild was not linked to Felkin (Chrism, 2006, p2)

Felkin was not satisfied with astral meetings as he wished for physical contact with the Secret Chiefs. From 1901 onwards, he traveled extensively in hoping to meet authentic Rosicrucians. In 1906, he believed he had found what he was looking for: a professor, his adopted daughter, and another gentleman, all who he believed were in fact Rosicrucians. The professors' adopted daughter had claimed to be the niece of Anna Sprengel (the Secret Chief who authorised the founding of the original Golden Dawn), and also claimed that her aunt was a member of the same organization as herself.

The purported Rosicrucian group which Felkin had made contact with was led by Rudolf Steiner, founder of the Anthroposophical Society, and at that time, still head of the German section of the Theosophical Society. King explains that it didn't appear as though this group was Theosophical, nor did it appear to be any later form of Anthroposophy. He speculates that, since Steiner was at that time also the Austrian Chief of Ordo Templi Orientis, his first Rosicrucian grade bore resemblance to the original first Degree of O.T.O.

== Known members ==
- Herbert Burrows -- British socialist (according to Ritual Magic in England a.k.a. Modern Ritual Magic: The Rise of Western Occultism by Francis King)
- James Chapman-Taylor
- Robert Felkin – Frater Finem Respice: Imperator
- Dion Fortune – Deo, non-fortuna – writer and founder of the Society of the Inner Light
- E. Graham Howe – British psychiatrist who brought Eastern philosophy and psychotherapy to England
- Edith Nesbit - English writer best known for her children's literature (British socialist (according to Ritual Magic in England by Francis King)
- Israel Regardie – Frater Ad Maiorem Adonai Gloriam
- W. B. Yeats – Irish poet and winner of the Nobel Prize for Literature

== See also ==
- Magical organization
