= Whare Ra =

Building which housed the New Zealand branch of the magical order the Stella Matutina

Coordinates: 39°40′36″S 176°53′21″E

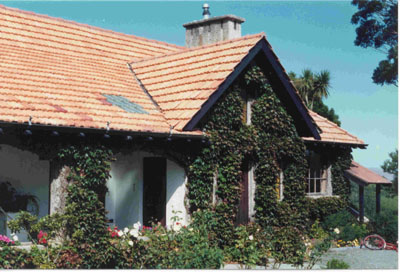
- The north side of Whare Ra

General information
- Location: 2 Tauroa Road, Havelock North
- Year built: 1913

Design and construction
- Architect: James Chapman-Taylor

Heritage New Zealand – Category 1
- Designated: 28 June 1990
- Reference no.: 4407

Whare Ra is a building in Havelock North in the Hawkes Bay region of New Zealand. The building housed the New Zealand branch of the magical order the Stella Matutina. It was designed and overseen by James Chapman-Taylor, a senior member of the order.

Whare Ra was one of the last surviving temples that could trace its lineage back to the original Hermetic Order of the Golden Dawn. It was the only temple to operate in a permanent, purpose-built building.

== Early preparations ==
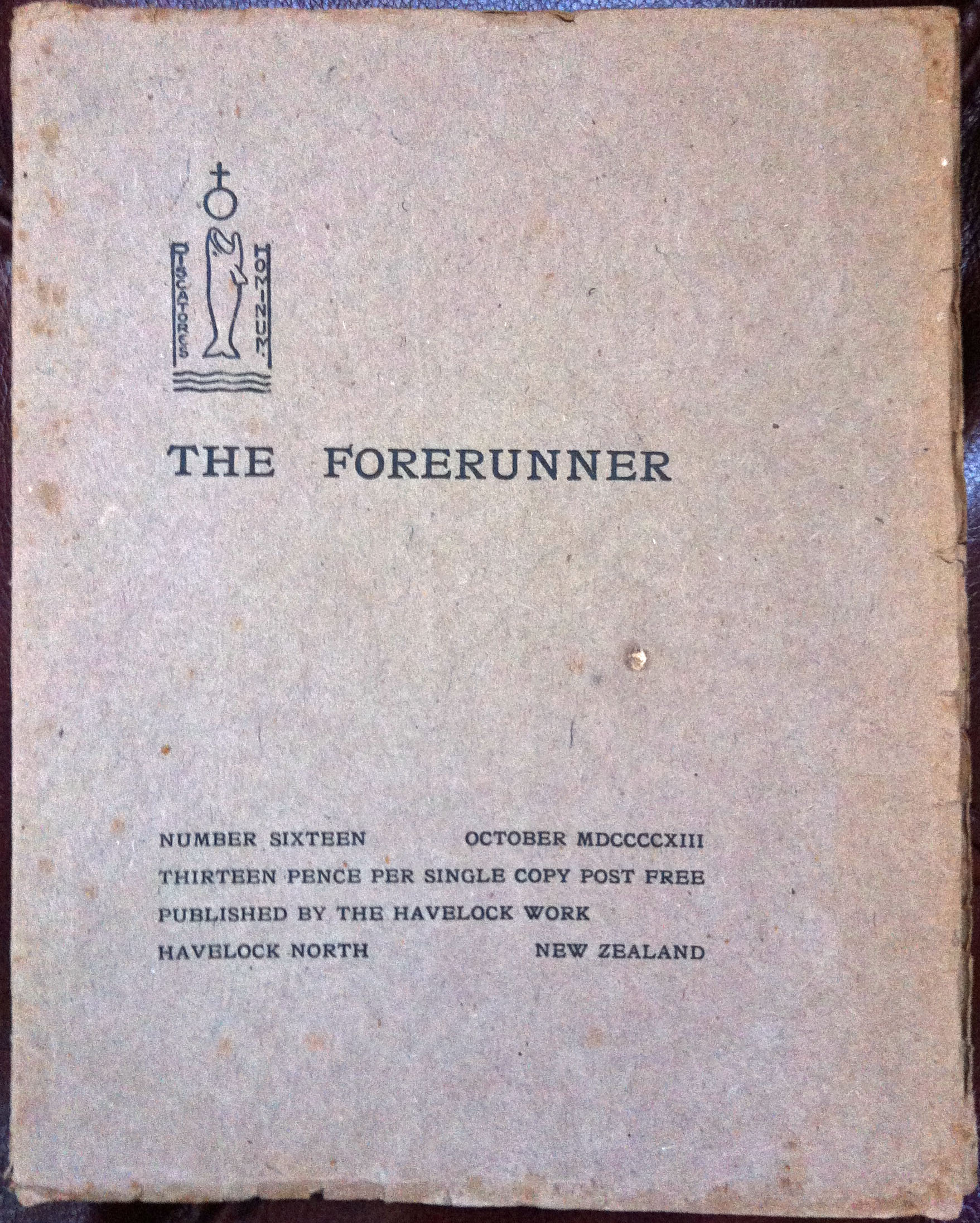
Cover of The Forerunner, No. 16, October 1913.

The foundations for the Order in New Zealand were laid by Reginald Gardiner (1872-1959). Born in New South Wales, Australia, he was the son of an Anglican vicar and brother of the Anglican vicar of St Luke's Church, Havelock North, New Zealand, where he settled in 1907. He formed about him an artistic, cultural and spiritual group whose activities became known as the "Havelock Work", and produced a publication called The Forerunner. The Havelock Work grew and in time the group became known as the Society of the Southern Cross.

In 1910, Revd. Father J. Fitzgerald travelled to New Zealand on Church business, and was introduced to the group. He was suitably impressed, and prior to his return to Britain, promised to stay in touch and to do what he could to help. One of the last G.H. Chiefs of the Order later recollected:

Needless to say, this visit filled the group with hope and expectation. They kept in touch with the priest after he returned to England and conducted their meetings as he instructed them.

In due course he wrote that if further progress were to be made, that certain people of his acquaintance would need to come out from England.

In 1912 Dr. Robert Felkin, Chief of the Order of the Stella Matutina arrived, assisted by his appointment as Inspector of the Australasian Colleges of the Societas Rosicruciana in Anglia by William Wynn Westcott, one of the original Chiefs of the Hermetic Order of the Golden Dawn and Supreme Magus of the S.R.I.A.

== Founding of the Smaragdum Thallasses Temple No 49 ==
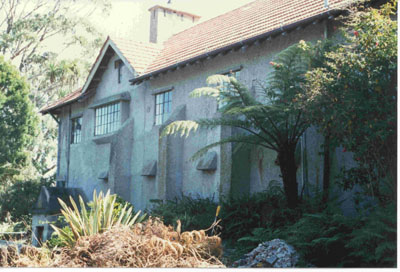
The South side of Whare Ra.

Travelling with his wife and daughter, he initiated a group of twenty-four members into the Order, twelve of whom were advanced to the "Second Order". A sizeable piece of land on Tauroa Road in Havelock North was donated, and a home for the Order constructed, which they named “Whare Ra”, or House of the Sun. It was in the basement of this house that the large Temple was built.

Whare Ra is a large 3,000 sq. ft. building with the upper floor having the same footprint as the Temple below. The reinforced concrete construction was an innovative choice at the time when there was still strong resistance to any building material other than timber. But 'Whare Ra' was to be a very different building from a domestic home and the advantages of fire resistance, low maintenance, permanence and durability appealed. Also, the monolithic quality could not be ignored and it was desirable that the Temple should be of one continuous form. The reinforced walls were six inches thick and were poured by sections at a time into boxing of around a metre in height.

During their three-month stay, sufficient members had been initiated to make a beginning, and the building commissioned and sufficiently advanced to enable its Consecration. Before leaving New Zealand to return to England, a Warrant was issued establishing the Smaragdum Thallasses Temple No. 49 of the Order of the Stella Matutina. The three Chiefs that appeared on the Warrant were Reginald Gardiner, Mason Chambers, and probably Harold Large (or possibly Thomas Chambers).

A trust had been set up to manage the monetary affairs of the Order, with the trustees being Mason Chambers, his wife Margaret Chambers, the younger John Chambers, and Reginald Gardiner. The trust deed stated that the group was formed:

For the purpose of instituting carrying on or developing such scientific, religious charitable and similar work as the trustees shall in this discretion deem expedient and also for the purpose of aiding and assisting the carrying out or developing of literary work in all its branches and crafts work and similar or analogous work of which the trustees may in their absolute discretion approve or for such one or more or all of the above purposes as the trustees may from time to time determine.

John von Dadelszen, who spent most of his adult life in the Order, and who had been a Temple Warden and one of its last Chiefs, stated that the Order:

...used a threefold system of training, i.e. ceremonial, meditation and personal study. The ceremonial involved a series of grades, with an appropriate ritual for each grade; rather on the lines of Masonic degrees, but based on the symbolism of the Tree of Life, which is the Hebrew Qabalah. There was also a special ceremony, of a more cosmic nature, to mark the vernal and autumnal equinoxes.

A contemporary of John von Dadelszen, and fellow Chief Archie Shaw, wrote of the role of the three Chiefs, in his 1960 address to members:

The three Chiefs are responsible for the conduct of the whole Order, under the guidance of the Divine Powers Who direct the Order.

Each Chief brings to his office his own particular talents. Together they form an equilateral triangle - a balanced and harmonious whole, and should be regarded as equal in all respects.

The Chiefs should act in harmony and speak as one in all matters pertaining to the rule of the Order. They have the responsibility of ensuring that the true traditions of the Order are preserved, no matter what changes may come about in the future. They will consult as necessity arises, with the Council of the Order, composed of senior members, and may possibly delegate certain duties to senior members from time to time.

The three Wardens also form a triangle, and are responsible, as deputies of the three Chiefs, for the running of the Outer Order. In practice they should be regarded as equal with one another in their office as Warden, notwithstanding that they may possibly be of different Grades.

The Chiefs will meet with the Wardens at regular intervals, and generally maintain such contact as is necessary for the smooth functioning of the whole.

== The Work ==
Students who had been initiated into the Order had to follow a curriculum of activities.

Each member was expected to follow a structured daily discipline of ritual, meditation, prayer, exercise and study, not too dissimilar (although obviously less extreme) to the routine of a devout monk or nun in a religious order.

Topics studied included comparative religion, mythology, geomancy, astrology, tarot, cabala, alchemy and tatwas.

After a minimum prescribed period, and having passed appropriate examinations, a student would then progress to the next grade, and receive another “Advancement” through a ceremonial experience. In all, there was one initiation ceremony and 10 advancement ceremonies used in the Order, although arguably the last one or possible two were reserved for a small number of very senior members and leaders of the group.

The Order was really two orders, an “Outer” or “First Order” where basic disciplines and rudimentary knowledge were taught, and an “Inner” or “Second Order” where in essence the member received advanced teachings to enable them to become effectively priests, capable of making their own connection with the divine. Admission to the Second Order was by invitation only.

The “Work” of the Second Order took the theory and knowledge taught in the First Order, and turned it into ceremonial and ritual with the intent of strengthening the link with the divine, personal spiritual enlightenment, and the advancement of life in general.

The core content of the study materials and the methods used by members of the Smaragdum Thallasses included almost all (if not all) of the original content of the Golden Dawn, verbatim. However, some of the wording in the initiation and advancement ceremonies were changed by the Stella Matutina, which the Smaragdum Thallasses came out of, minimising masonic style references but by and large keeping the structure and intent the same as the original.

After time, and with decades of experience applying the methods of the Golden Dawn, the Smaragdum Thallasses also produce a plethora of new material to its membership.

== The temple prospers ==
In 1916, at the invitation of the members of the New Zealand branch, and with the offer of life tenancy of “Whare Ra”, Felkin and his family returned to New Zealand for good. He issued a new constitution for the Order of the Stella Matutina in the same year, informing members that the Mother Temple of the Order was now in New Zealand. The Order, governed by three ruling Chiefs, prospered under their leadership. By the time of the death of Felkin in 1926, it had a very active membership and was well established – its membership included two Anglican Bishops, General Sir Arthur Russell, Lord Jellicoe, Governor General of New Zealand, members of Parliament, and local dignitaries and officials.

Entrance to the Temple, by the candidate for initiation, was via a secret staircase behind a wardrobe, located in Felkin's surgery.

Halfway down the stairs, where the candidate was required to await further instructions, was a landing, known as “the Cave”, lined with hessian curtains on which Egyptian figures were worked in light blue. After an interval of time the candidate was met by two Temple officers dressed in robes and Egyptian headdresses, blind-folded by one of them, and then led into the Temple where the ceremony of initiation began.

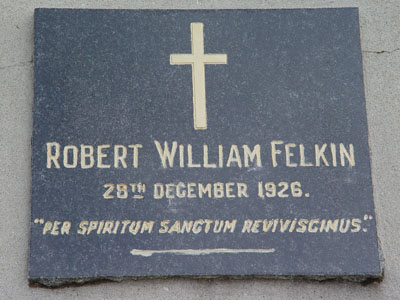
Felkin's grave inscription.

In 1931 a devastating earthquake hit the area, and many buildings were levelled or damaged. With its fortress like construction, Whare Ra was unscathed.

The big earthquake of 1931 did no damage whatsoever. Except that the Black Pillar, being top-heavy fell on the paw of the black sphinx on the north side of the steps to the dais in the Temple below the house.

Gardiner replaced Felkin as a Greatly Honoured Chief of the Order, and with Mrs and Miss Felkin, ruled for a further stable period of 33 years.

In its heyday during the 1930s, it has been estimated that its membership numbered some 300 men and women, and during its 60-plus-year history that approximately 400–500 people had been initiated. It was during this time that the Temple distanced itself from the affairs of the Stella Matutina in Britain, and renamed itself simply the Order of Smaragdum Thallasses.

In 1949, in the last issue of The Lantern, Mrs. Felkin stated:

Perhaps, before very long. someone else will take up the torch that I lay down and endeavour to carry the light a little further. Put as briefly as I can express it, I think it is the conviction of the reality of a spiritual world, not beyond or above our ordinary, everyday world, but interwoven with it here and now.

In the Annual Report for year ending 31 December 1959, the Order's Cancellarius reported that:

During the past year 18 Ceremonies were held and the number of members advanced to the higher grades will add greatly to the strength of the Order. Four new members were admitted and we welcome them. It may be said that four new members in one year is not many, but we must remember that the Path of Initiation is only for the few. The Order does not actively seek members, but those who are ready are inevitably drawn to the Light.

In 1959 Gardiner and Mrs Felkin died, followed by Miss Felkin three years later.

During the late 1960s, Frater Albertus of the Paracelsus Research Society visited Whare Ra. He reported this visit to members of the society in one of their bulletins.

In the heart of the north island--New Zealand has two main islands-- is an interesting spot where much activity centers about the ancient wisdom. Not only are the Maories custodians of this ancient wisdom, but the later settlers brought much with them from Europe that they know how to perpetuate. Dr. Felkin was one of them. Under the Maori name "Whare Ra" (house of the sun) the Order of the Golden Dawn has its present quarters and underground temple in a beautiful, secluded and heavily landscaped place. The "chiefs" as they are called, heading Whare Ra, Messrs. von Dadelszen and Salt and Mrs. Jones, whom we met proved to be very fine people with a fervent interest in perpetuating the work of the Golden Dawn, brought to New Zealand by Felkin before the first World War.

== Decline ==
By 1978 it was clear that Whare Ra was a spent force. On 24 August 1978 a letter was circulated to members announcing the closure:

Dear Fratres and Sorores,

This letter is addressed to all members of the Order of S.T., including members of the Second Order.

It is with great great regret that we write to inform you that the Temple is closing and there will be no Vernal Equinox Ceremony.

Those of you who have been present at recent Equinox Ceremonies will surely have been aware, not only of the lack of numbers, but also the lack of power, in the Temple. Those who have read their annual reports can scarcely have failed to notice that no new members have been admitted since 1975. Indeed there have been no grade ceremonies at all for the last two years or more. ...

Much to the regret of many esoteric historians, they burnt most of the group's regalia, Temple furnishings and records. Some things survived, including the Temple's pillars, the two sphinxes which flanked either side of the dais steps. Many copies of the rituals and lectures were passed on and preserved.

Whare Ra is now in private hands, and has been registered as a Category I protected building by the New Zealand Historic Places Trust.

== Well known members ==
- Euan Campbell - was the Order’s Enochian expert, he was also a 9=2, a Grade usually held only by senior Chiefs of the Order.
- James Walter Chapman-Taylor - was the architect of Whare Ra and maker of much of the temple furnishings. He held the Grade of 7=4.
- Harriot Miller Felkin - was one of the three founding Chiefs of the temple in New Zealand, also the wife of Dr Felkin, she was initiated into the Amoun Temple of the Stella Matutina in England in 1904. She held the Grade of 9=2.
- Nora Ethelwyn Felkin- was one of the three founding Chiefs of the temple in New Zealand, also the daughter of Dr Felkin, she was initiated into the Amoun Temple of the Stella Matutina in England in 1904. She held the Grade of 8=3.
- Robert William Felkin - was one of the founding Chiefs of the Stella Matutina. He was initiated into the Amen Ra Temple of the Golden Dawn in 1894. He held the Grade of 9=2.
- Reginald Gardener - his motto appears on the Whare Ra Warrant as one of the founding Temple Chiefs. He became an Order Chief in 1927 on the death of Dr. Felkin. He held the Grade of 9=2.
- Hobson, Nancy - became an Order Chief in 1963 after the death of Ms. Felkin. She had previously been Imperator, and was an 8=3.
- Bethany (Betty) Jones - became an Order Chief on the resignation of Archie Shaw. She was previously Sub-Demonstrator and an 8=3.
- David Osbourne - became Cancellarius in 1959. He was a 7=4.
- Frank Salt - better known as Fiat Lux, was Initiated into the Order in 1936. He was acting Cancellarius for 6 months before becoming Demonstrator in 1959. He held the Grade of 7=4.
- Archie Shaw - became an Order Chief in 1960 on the death of Mrs. Felkin. He had previously been Demonstrator, and held the Grade of 8=3.
- Jack Taylor - resigned from the Order in 1960, after being passed over as either an Order Chief or the Demonstrator, to focus on the Order of the Table Round of which he was the head. He held the Grade of 7=4.
- John Von Dadelszen - became an Order Chief in 1959 on the death of Reginald Gardener. He was previously Cancellarius, and held the Grade of 9=2.
- Percy Wilkinson - was a 6=5 member of the Order.
