= Havelock North Intermediate =

Location
- Nimon Street, Havelock North, New Zealand; 39.6646°S 176.893°E

Information
- Type: State Co-Ed Intermediate (Year 7-8)
- Motto: Learning Together
- Ministry of Education Institution no.: 2572
- Principal: Julia Beaumont
- Enrolment: 523 (July 2026)
- Socio-economic decile: 8
- Website: www.hni.school.nz

Havelock North Intermediate is a middle school located in Havelock North, Hawke's Bay, New Zealand. The school was redeveloped in the mid-2000s, with a new administration block, media suite and performing arts centre.
