= James Chapman-Taylor =

New Zealand architect

- Born: James Walter Chapman-Taylor; 24 June 1878; London, England
- Died: 25 October 1958 (aged 80); Lower Hutt, New Zealand
- Occupation: Architect
- Buildings: 97 houses

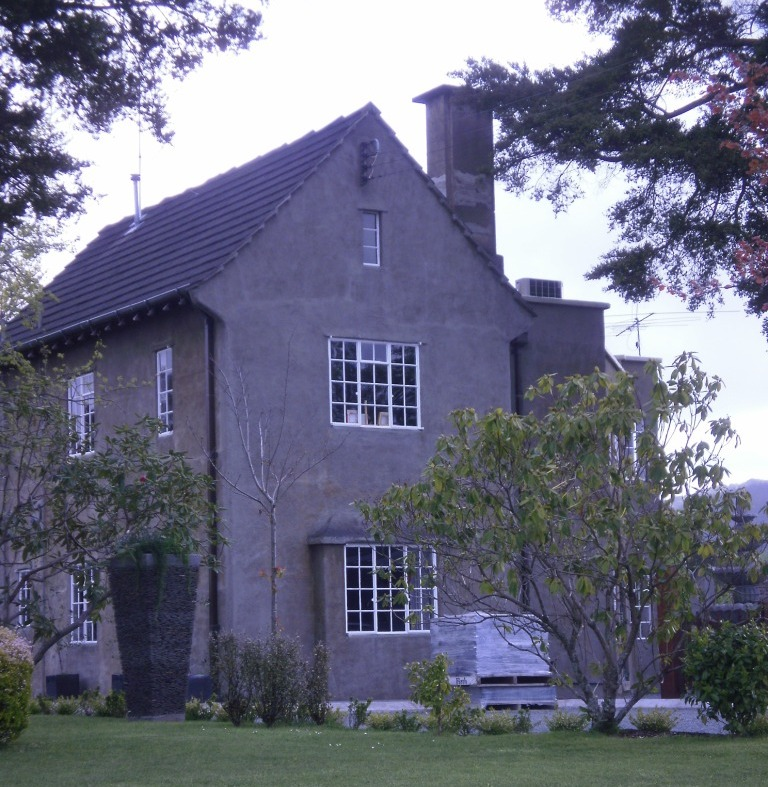
Brentwood Manor, built 1931, a Chapman-Taylor designed house in Upper Hutt, New Zealand

James Walter Chapman-Taylor (24 June 1878 – 25 October 1958) was a New Zealand architect. One of the country's most important domestic architects of his time, he is noted mainly for his Arts and Crafts-influenced houses. Chapman-Taylor was also a skilled craftsman, builder, furniture designer and photographer, and had a keen interest in astrology.

== Early days ==
James Walter Chapman-Taylor was born in London in 1878 to Theodore Chapman-Taylor and his wife, Ada Thomas. In 1879 Theodore migrated to New Zealand where he purchased land a few miles south of Stratford in the Taranaki region. Ada, James and a younger brother joined him in June 1880, with the family subsequently becoming dairy farmers.

== Career choices ==
By his teenage years Chapman-Taylor had decided against farming as a career and became an apprentice to a local builder. After completing his apprenticeship, he constructed his first building, a single- storied timber house for his parents on their Stratford property. On 12 April 1900 he married Mary Gibson at Stratford and in 1903 he enrolled himself in an architecture and design course with the International Correspondence Schools of Scranton, Pennsylvania. In 1904 he moved to Wellington after working on the construction of the Taihape railway station. From around 1907 he used the surname Chapman-Taylor.

== Travel ==
In 1909 Chapman-Taylor travelled to England to study and meet first hand the works of C.F.A. Voysey, Baille Scott, and Parker and Unwin whose names were famous in the field of domestic architecture. Upon his return to New Zealand Chapman-Taylor was determined to follow the basic principles on which good domestic architecture had been developed – designing and building houses with skill and sensitivity. He was influenced by the Arts and Crafts movement's interpretation of rural English cottage construction and style and returned to New Zealand to integrate this into New Zealand materials and settings.

== Furniture ==
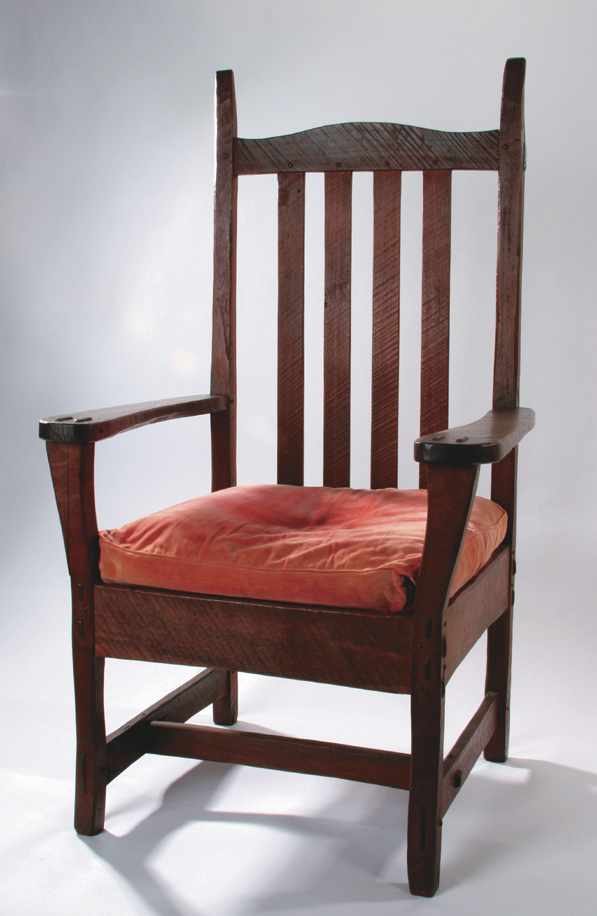
Adze-hewn jarrah chair created by James Chapman-Taylor (circa 1910).

Chapman-Taylor believed that a hand finished technique using an adze gave a "woody character" emphasised the handmade nature of the work, reflecting light to add "interest and beauty" to the wood with no further need for decoration or embellishment. Richly coloured, dense jarrah was a timber he used so extensively in his houses and furniture that he was known as 'Jarrah Taylor.' Chapman-Taylor's distinctive approach using an adze by hand, and the Arts and Crafts principles of simplicity and honesty is evident in the joinery and overall design of a chair made in 1910.

== Mature phase ==
As a mature style emerged, Chapman-Taylor's designs became more cohesive. Concrete was used as the preferred building material, finishing the outside walls in a roughcast plaster. Following in the footsteps and adhering to principles first exposed by John Ruskin and William Morris the consistency in his work became a result of his loyalty to their creed. Chapman-Taylor showed confidence to express his individuality and sense of freedom to explore and experiment. Chapman-Taylor's houses were designed through to the smallest detail. Many of his surviving buildings include pieces of his furniture designs.

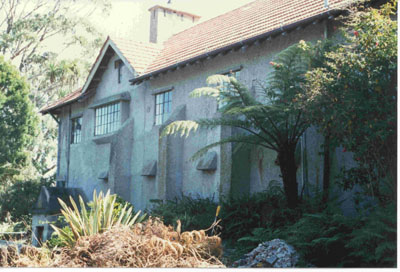
Whare Ra, built 1915, Havelock North, New Zealand.

Exteriors were characterised by high roofs with Marseille tiles, plain roughcast walls and small paned windows. The extensive use of hand shaped timbers in the interiors of the houses further defined his work. Chapman-Taylorʼs houses revealed his distinctive touch and his interpretation of the English cottage style that the Arts and Crafts Movement promoted. Chapman-Taylor designed many houses and they can be found throughout New Zealand. Several examples can be found in Taranaki, including the building fondly known as Wilkie's Castle, situated at Wai-iti in North Taranaki, and Plas Mawr in New Plymouth. In Havelock North he designed the Whare Ra building for the Stella Matutina order.

Chapman-Taylor died on 28 October 1958 at the age of 80 from a sudden illness.

"All Chapman-Taylor’s houses are economical in their use of space, intimate in detailing, and extremely satisfying to live in." —J. Stacpoole and P. Beaven, New Zealand Art: Architecture 1820-1970.
