= Merton Hodge =

New Zealand playwright, actor and medical practitioner

- Born: Horace Emerton Hodge; 28 March 1903; Taruheru, Poverty Bay, New Zealand
- Died: 9 October 1958 (aged 55); Dunedin, New Zealand
- Occupations: actor, medical practitioner, playwright

Horace Emerton Hodge (28 March 1903 – 9 October 1958), known as Merton Hodge was a playwright, actor and medical practitioner.

== Life ==
Hodge was born in Taruheru, Poverty Bay, New Zealand. His father was a farmer named Alfred Hodge. He studied at Kings College in Auckland and later attended The University of Otago to study medicine in 1925. During his time at university, Hodge developed an interest in performing arts and was a member of the University Dramatic Society. He wrote a play for the society that later became The Wind and the Rain.

Hodge graduated from the University of Otago in 1928 (M.B., Ch.B). He briefly worked at Wellington Public Hospital as a casualty officer and also as a doctor aboard the 'Port Pirie' ship. In 1931, Hodge arrived in the United Kingdom and underwent postgraduate studies at the University of Edinburgh.

After a stint in New York working in theatre, Hodge returned to London in 1939 and worked for Camberwell Hospital for Nervous Diseases. He later toured with ENSA before resuming medicine in 1948. Hodge relocated from London to Dunedin, New Zealand in 1952.

Hodge is believed to have married Kathleen Rutherford. However, some sources dispute this.

Hodge ended his life by drowning on 9 October 1958, aged 54.

== Plays ==
Hodge is best known for his comedy The Wind and the Rain, which was performed 1,001 times, from 1933, at St. Martin's Theatre in London's West End, and six months in 1934 at the Ritz Theatre on New York's Broadway, toured the world and was translated into nine languages.

Plays produced in London:

- The Wind and the Rain, St Martin's Theatre, 1933–1935;
- Grief Goes Over which starred Sybil Thorndike, Globe Theatre, 1935;
- Men in White (anglicised version of the play by Sidney Kingsley), Lyric Theatre, 1935;
- The Orchard Walls, St James Theatre, 1937;
- The Island, written with actor Godfrey Tearle, Comedy Theatre, 1938;
- The Story of An African Farm, New Theatre (from Olive Schreiner's novel), 1938;
- To Whom We Belong, Q Theatre, 1939;
- Once There Was Music, Q Theatre, 1942;

=== Recordings ===
- My Life in the Theatre, series for overseas broadcast for British Broadcasting Service.

== Publications ==
The plays The Wind and the Rain, Grief Goes Over, Men in White, The Island, The Story of An African Farm and a novelised version of The Wind and the Rain, 1936.
