= John William Brodie-Innes =

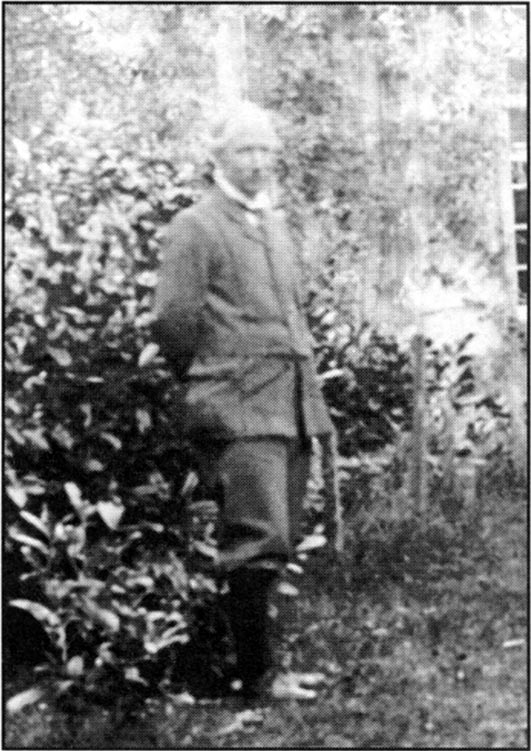
John William Brodie-Innes

John William Brodie-Innes (10 March 1848 – 8 December 1923) was a leading member of the Hermetic Order of the Golden Dawn's Amen-Ra Temple in Edinburgh.

J.W. Brodie-Innes was born at Downe in Kent, where his Scottish born father Rev. John Brodie Innes (1815-1894) had been Vicar from 1846. His father was a friend and confidant of a neighbour at Downe, Charles Darwin. A lawyer by profession, he was a member of the Sette of Odde Volumes (a London bibliophile society), and was its president in 1911. He wrote several novels on witchcraft and magic. The most well-known is The Devil's Mistress (1915), a supernatural horror novel centred on the real-life accusations of witchcraft made against Isobel Gowdie. Brodie-Innes is believed to have been one of Dion Fortune's occult teachers. (Fortune was also taught by such occult practitioners as Moina Mathers and Dr Theodore Moriarty).

Throughout the dissensions of the Golden Dawn, Brodie-Innes remained loyal to MacGregor Mathers, and on the death of his chief in 1918 published an affectionate obituary titled "MacGregor Mathers - Some Personal Reminiscences" in the May 1919 issue of The Occult Review.

== Sources ==
- Brodie-Innes, John William (1891), "Legal Aspects of Hypnotism", Vol.3, No.1, (January 1891), pp. 51-62.
- Brodie-Innes, J.W. Scottish Witchcraft Trials. London: Chis-wick Press, 1891.
- Gilbert, R. A., ed. The Sorcerer and His Apprentice: Unknown Hermetic Writings of S. L. MacGregor Mathers and J. W. Brodie-Innes. Wellingborough, England: Aquarian Press, 1983.
- Richardson, Alan. Priestess: The Life and Magic of Dion Fortune. Wellingborough, England: Aquarian Press, 1987.
