= Havelock North =

Town in Hawke's Bay Region, New Zealand

Havelock North Karanema
- Town
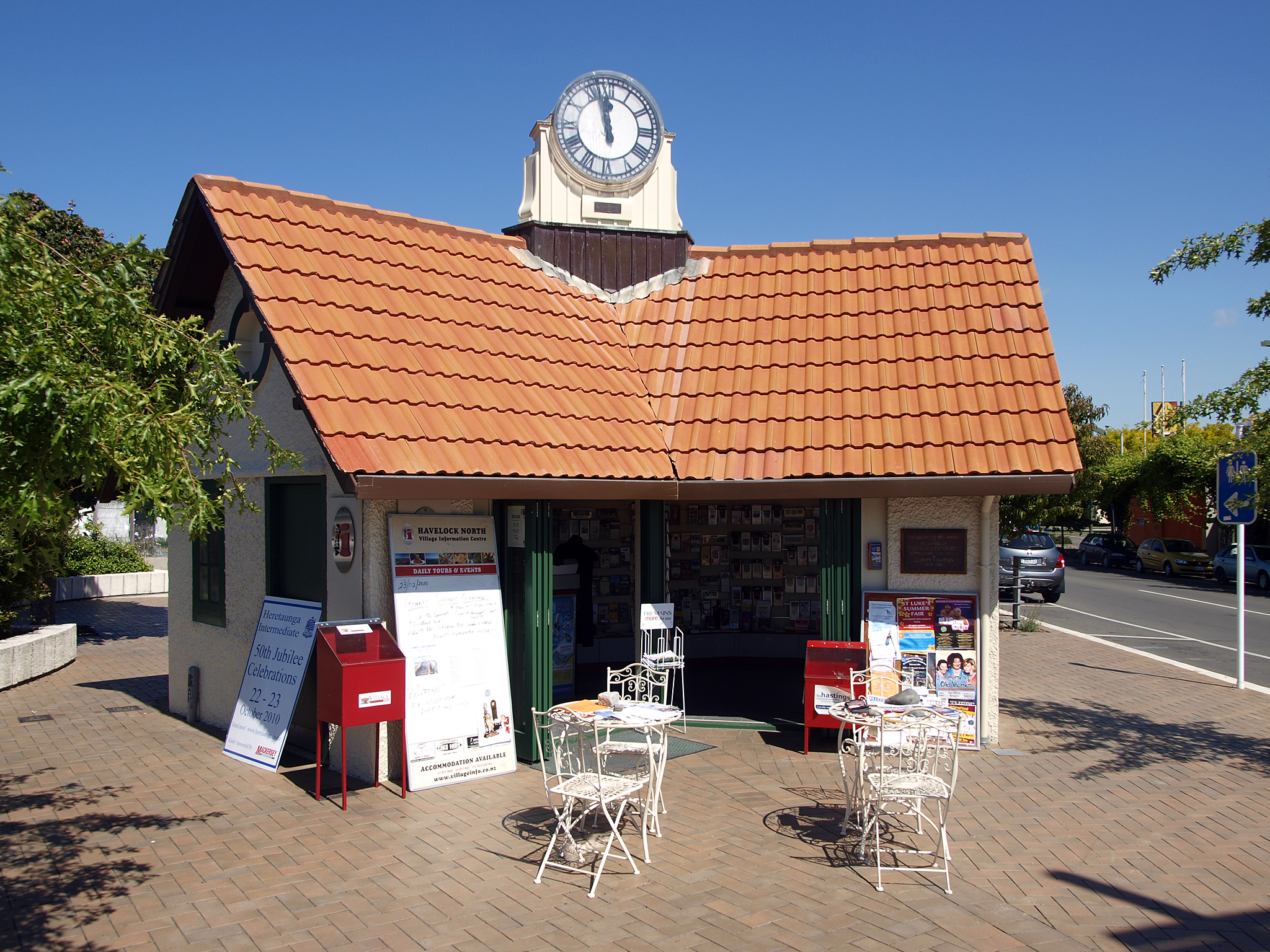
- Clock Tower Building (1914)
- Interactive map of Havelock North
- Coordinates: 39°40′S 176°53′E
- Country: New Zealand
- Region: Hawke's Bay
- Territorial authority: Hastings District
- Ward: Hastings-Havelock North General Ward; Heretaunga General Ward; Kahurānaki General Ward; Takitimu Māori Ward
- Electorates: Tukituki; Ikaroa-Rāwhiti (Māori)

Government
  - Territorial Authority: Hastings District Council
  - Regional council: Hawke's Bay Regional Council
  - Mayor of Hastings: Wendy Schollum
  - Tukituki MP: Catherine Wedd
  - Ikaroa-Rāwhiti MP: Cushla Tangaere-Manuel

Area
  - Total: 23.12 km^{2} (8.93 sq mi)

Population (June 2025)
  - Total: 15,000
  - Density: 650/km^{2} (1,700/sq mi)
- Postcode: 4130
- Area code: 06

Havelock North (Māori: Karanema) is a town in the Hawke's Bay region of the North Island of New Zealand, situated less than 2 km south-east of the city of Hastings. It was a borough for many years until the 1989 reorganisation of local government saw it merged into the new Hastings District, and it is now administered by the Hastings District Council.

== Overview ==
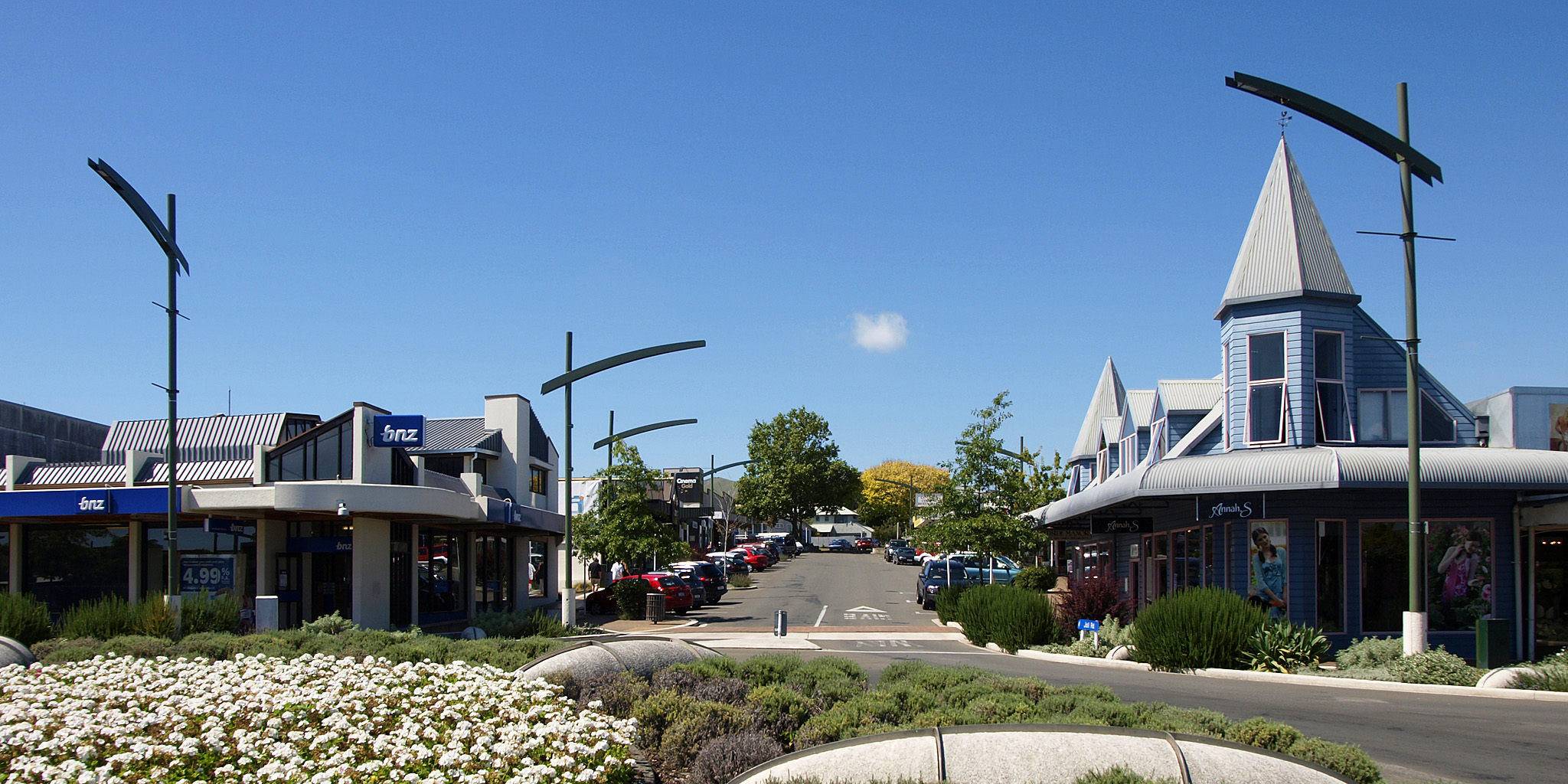
Joll Road. One of the six roads from town centre which are in radial order.

The suburb, known locally as "the village", is situated on the Heretaunga Plains, less than 2 km to the south-east of Hastings. It is surrounded by numerous orchards and vineyards, and its industry is based around its fruit and wine production, and a horticultural research centre. The fertile soils that lie between Havelock North and Hastings has prevented urban sprawl linking them together. Havelock North itself is primarily residential and rural-residential housing, with only a relatively small and compact industrial and commercial centre. As a result, a large majority of its 15,000 residents commute each morning to the nearby cities (Hastings or Napier) for work.

Havelock North is generally hilly, and small gullies have been formed by the creeks and streams flowing from higher ground, resulting in a small amount of inaccessible or steep land which is converted into forests, parks or reserves, giving the image of naturally having many bushes and trees. This is due to the town being situated at the base of the prominent landmark Te Mata Peak, a 399-metre outcrop, which according to local Māori legend is the body of the giant Te Mata o Rongokako, and the depression in the land visible behind his head according to the myth is where he tried to bite through the mountain range which filled his stomach turning him to stone.

Both Hastings and Havelock North obtain water from secure confined aquifer systems. The Te Mata aquifer that feeds Havelock North is very similar to Hastings in quality, but has slightly elevated calcium levels. Hastings is situated directly over the Heretaunga Plains aquifer system.

== History ==
Havelock North was founded as a planned Government settlement following the purchase in 1858, from Māori owners, of land previously known as 'Karanema's Reserve'. The original village was laid out in 1860, taking its name from Sir Henry Havelock, who was involved in the suppression of the Indian Uprising, thus keeping with the local habit of naming towns after prominent men from Imperial India. Its founders originally envisaged a larger town for the site, but when the Wellington–Napier rail line went through the area in 1874 it took a direct route some distance from Havelock North, and Hastings became a more logical choice for residents.

In the early 1800s, the local Karamu Stream was part of the much larger Ngaruroro River system. It was termed the "River Plassey", the same name also being applied to a street in the village after the battle of Plassey of 1757 near Calcutta. Early survey plans of Havelock North show ferry landings where boats would sail up and down the river to collect and deliver supplies. This practice was phased out in the 1880s, when a number of large floods diverted the Ngaruroro River to its current course further north away from Havelock North. Later, during the 1931 earthquake, a bridge over the Karamu was completely destroyed.

Like a number of North Island towns, Havelock North has grown larger than its South Island namesake, Havelock, in the Marlborough Sounds.

Havelock North was the centre for Havelock Work, a quasi-religious movement based at a temple of the Stella Matutina magical order, which followed the early twentieth century teachings of the Hermetic Order of the Golden Dawn. The building housing the temple survives today as Whare Ra.

From 12 to 29 August 2016 the town experienced New Zealand's largest recorded outbreak of waterborne disease. Campylobacter entered the town's water supply after run off from a nearby sheep farm entered the Brookvale boreholes following heavy rain. Of the town's 13,000 residents, 5,500 fell ill, 45 were hospitalised and four died.

Coat of arms of the Havelock North Borough Council

== Demographics ==
Stats New Zealand describes Havelock North as a medium urban area which covers 23.12 km^{2} (8.93 sq mi). It had an estimated population of 15,000 as of June 2025, with a population density of 649 people per km^{2}.

Historical population
Year	Pop.	±% p.a.
2001	10,392	—
2006	12,222	+3.30%
2013	13,224	+1.13%
2018	14,391	+1.71%
2023	15,003	+0.84%
The 2006 population is for a smaller area of 22.52 km^{2}. The 2001 population may not use the same boundaries. Source:

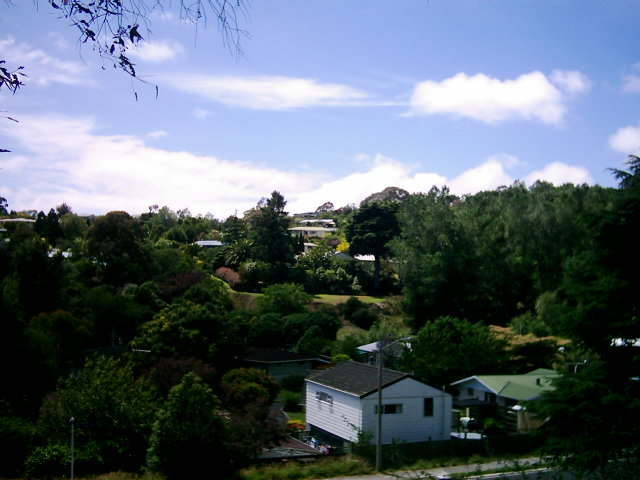
Suburban Havelock North

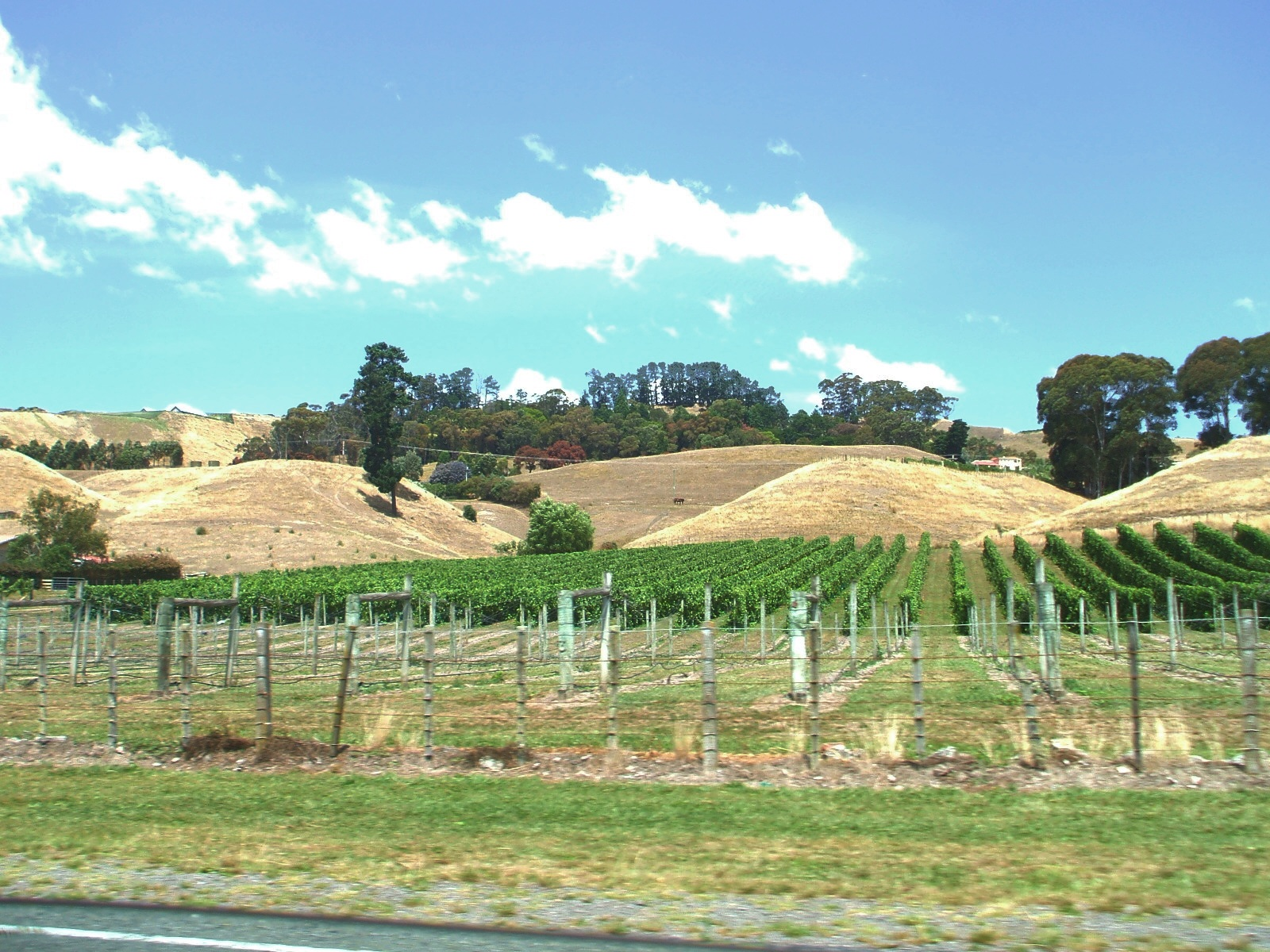
Vineyard on Te Mata Road in summer

Havelock North had a population of 15,003 in the 2023 New Zealand census, an increase of 612 people (4.3%) since the 2018 census, and an increase of 1,779 people (13.5%) since the 2013 census. There were 6,930 males, 8,022 females, and 48 people of other genders in 5,979 dwellings. 2.2% of people identified as LGBTIQ+. The median age was 48.8 years (compared with 38.1 years nationally). There were 2,703 people (18.0%) aged under 15 years, 1,878 (12.5%) aged 15 to 29, 6,255 (41.7%) aged 30 to 64, and 4,167 (27.8%) aged 65 or older.

People could identify as more than one ethnicity. The results were 89.9% European (Pākehā); 10.9% Māori; 1.6% Pasifika; 4.4% Asian; 1.3% Middle Eastern, Latin American and African New Zealanders (MELAA); and 2.8% other, which includes people giving their ethnicity as "New Zealander". English was spoken by 98.0%, Māori by 2.7%, Samoan by 0.4%, and other languages by 9.8%. No language could be spoken by 1.3% (e.g. too young to talk). New Zealand Sign Language was known by 0.5%. The percentage of people born overseas was 23.0, compared with 28.8% nationally.

Religious affiliations were 39.4% Christian, 0.7% Hindu, 0.5% Islam, 0.7% Māori religious beliefs, 0.5% Buddhist, 0.3% New Age, 0.1% Jewish, and 0.9% other religions. People who answered that they had no religion were 50.9%, and 6.1% of people did not answer the census question.

Of those at least 15 years old, 3,969 (32.3%) people had a bachelor's or higher degree, 6,069 (49.3%) had a post-high school certificate or diploma, and 2,268 (18.4%) people exclusively held high school qualifications. The median income was $44,100, compared with $41,500 nationally. 2,139 people (17.4%) earned over $100,000 compared to 12.1% nationally. The employment status of those at least 15 was 5,544 (45.1%) full-time, 1,884 (15.3%) part-time, and 210 (1.7%) unemployed.

Individual statistical areas
Name	Area (km^{2})	Population	Density (per km^{2})	Dwellings	Median age	Median income
Lucknow	0.90	1,707	1,897	612	35.6 years	$35,700
Karanema-St Hill	0.95	2,007	2,113	909	56.8 years	$32,800
Havelock North-Central	0.48	423	881	225	56.5 years	$38,500
Brookvale	2.01	2,640	519	1,044	51.2 years	$44,100
Iona	1.47	2,580	1,755	981	46.2 years	$46,000
Hereworth	1.62	2,952	1,822	1,161	47.5 years	$50,500
Te Mata Hills	12.71	1,101	87	414	51.7 years	$60,600
Havelock Hills	2.99	1,593	533	633	50.2 years	$54,900
New Zealand					38.1 years	$41,500

== Education ==
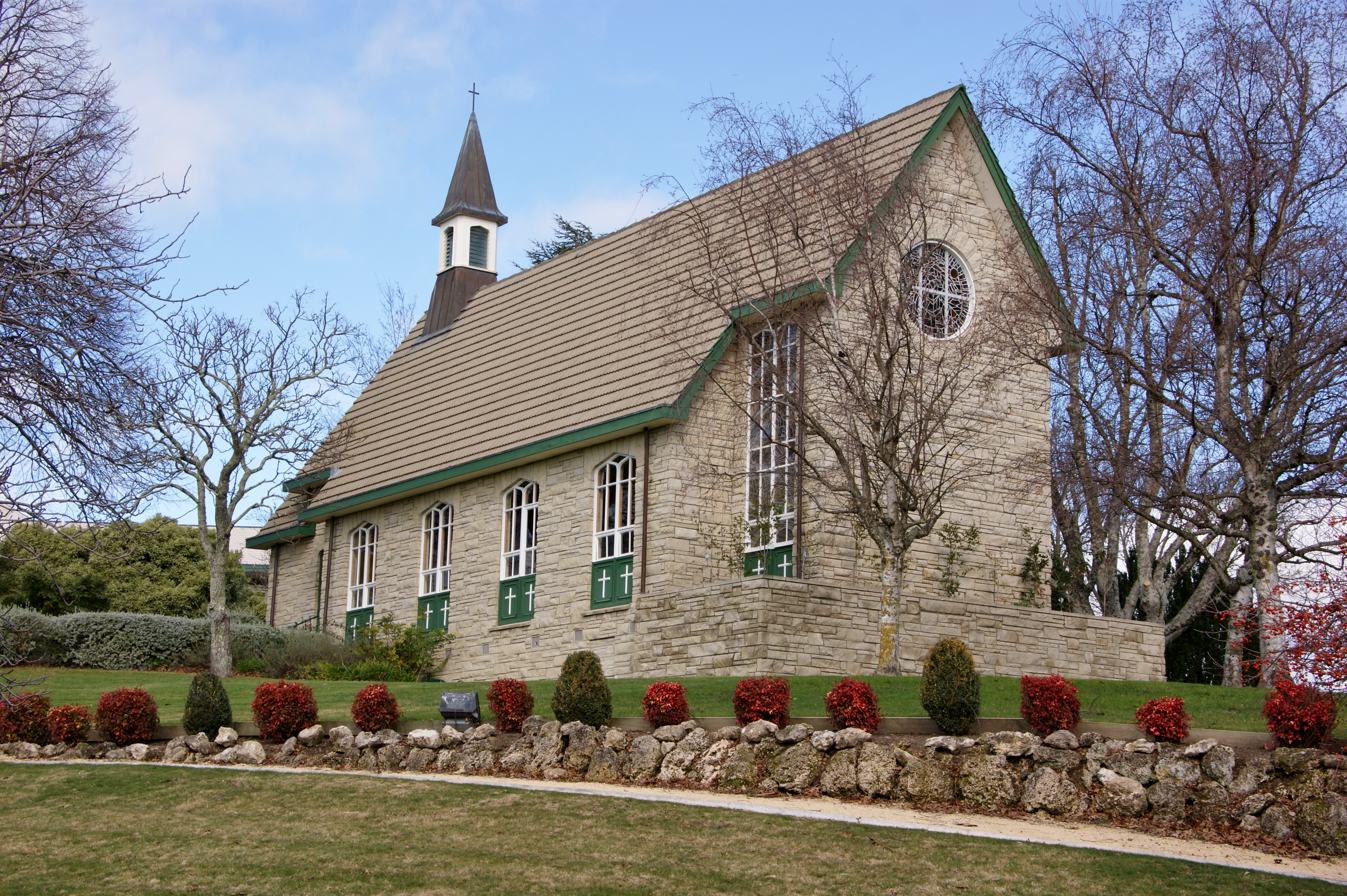
Hereworth School chapel

Havelock North has nine schools:

- Havelock North Primary School is a state contributing primary (Year 1–6) school with 542 students. It opened in 1878 on Te Mata Road where the public library is now. Previously, Havelock School, also called Swithland, opened in 1863.
- Lucknow School is a state contributing primary (Year 1–6) school with 258 students. It opened in 1963.
- Te Mata School is a state contributing primary (Year 1–6) school with 521 students.
- Hereworth School is a private full primary (Year 1–8) school with 332 students. It opened in 1927.
- Havelock North Intermediate is a state intermediate (Year 7–8) school with 523 students. It opened in 1974.
- Havelock North High School is a state secondary (Year 9–13) school with 1,153 students. The school opened in 1975.
- Hukarere Girls' College is a state integrated, single sex female, secondary (Year 9–13) school with boarding facilities. As of July 2026, has a roll of 53 students, of which 53 (100.0%) identify as Māori.
- Iona College is a state-integrated Presbyterian girls' secondary school (Year 7–13) with 339 students. It opened in 1914.
- Woodford House is a state-integrated Anglican girls' secondary (Year 7–13) school with 381 students. It was established by Annie Mabel Hodge in 1894. When she retired in 1922, she was succeeded by Dorice Mary Holland.

Hukarere Girls' College, Hereworth School, Iona College and Woodford House are boarding schools. They take a very few local day pupils.

School rolls are as of July 2026.

== Residents ==
Notable residents have included:

- Mac Cooper (1910–1989), agriculturalist and author
- Alan Duff (born 1950), novelist
- Rod Drury (born 1966), entrepreneur
- Dr Robert William Felkin (1853–1926), medical missionary, ceremonial magician, author on Uganda and Central Africa, explorer, and early anthropologist
- Neil Gaiman (born 1960), author
- Virginia Heath (born 1959), film director and academic
- Amy Hodgson(1888–1983), botanist
- Alfred Meebold (1863–1952), botanist, writer, and anthroposopher (died at Havelock North)
- Amanda Palmer (born 1976), musician
- Jarrod Smith (born 1984), footballer
- Ashley Stichbury (1971–2002), racing driver
- Herbert Sutcliffe (1878–1971), health advocate
- Ihaia West (born 1992), rugby union player

== Climate ==
Climate data for Havelock (1981–2010)
Month	Jan	Feb	Mar	Apr	May	Jun	Jul	Aug	Sep	Oct	Nov	Dec	Year
Mean daily maximum °C (°F)	24.4 (75.9)	24.1 (75.4)	22.5 (72.5)	19.8 (67.6)	17.4 (63.3)	14.9 (58.8)	13.9 (57.0)	14.8 (58.6)	16.9 (62.4)	19.2 (66.6)	20.8 (69.4)	23.1 (73.6)	19.3 (66.8)
Daily mean °C (°F)	18.2 (64.8)	18.2 (64.8)	16.5 (61.7)	13.5 (56.3)	11.1 (52.0)	8.7 (47.7)	8.2 (46.8)	9.1 (48.4)	11.1 (52.0)	13.0 (55.4)	14.8 (58.6)	17.3 (63.1)	13.3 (56.0)
Mean daily minimum °C (°F)	12.1 (53.8)	12.3 (54.1)	10.4 (50.7)	7.3 (45.1)	4.8 (40.6)	2.6 (36.7)	2.5 (36.5)	3.3 (37.9)	5.3 (41.5)	6.8 (44.2)	8.8 (47.8)	11.4 (52.5)	7.3 (45.1)
Average rainfall mm (inches)	49 (1.9)	54 (2.1)	71 (2.8)	69 (2.7)	64 (2.5)	84 (3.3)	89 (3.5)	88 (3.5)	59 (2.3)	55 (2.2)	43 (1.7)	70 (2.8)	795 (31.3)
Mean monthly sunshine hours	227.2	197.3	173.3	179.9	120.9	124.3	127.5	138.0	164.4	189.4	184.0	215.8	2,042
Source: NIWA (rainfall 1951–1980)
