= John Starr Cooke =

American mystic and spiritual teacher

John Starr Cooke (March 1920 – August 21, 1976) was an American mystic and spiritual teacher who influenced the development of the counterculture movement that emerged in San Francisco during 1966–1967. His teachings were based on the doctrine of “One Consciousness”, which Cooke believed was communicated to him through a Ouija board in the early 1960s. He designed three original decks of Tarot cards: T: The New Tarot for the Aquarian Age (1967, 1992), the Atlantean Tarot (1992), and the Medieval Tarot (1992).

== Early life in Hawaii ==
Cooke was born in 1920 into a wealthy family in Honolulu, Hawaii, the youngest of the eight children of Clarence Hyde Cooke and Lily Love. He is a nephew of zoologist Charles Montague Cooke Jr, grandson of arts philanthropist Anna Rice Cooke, great-grandson of New England missionaries Amos Starr Cooke and Juliette Montague, and great-great-great-grandson of American military officer in the Revolutionary war and politician Joseph Platt Cooke.

According to Brion Gysin, Cooke was in touch with the Kahunas of Hawaii from an early age. In later life, Cooke knew Kahuna David “Big Daddy” Bray (1889–1968), a friendship that likely began in Cooke's childhood. Cooke developed a lifelong interest in the Tarot at the age of nine when he mistakenly bought a Tarot deck instead of regular playing cards. John travelled to the mainland (particularly San Francisco) many times with his mother before her death in 1933.

John's sister Alice married Democratic politician and lawyer Roger Kent in 1930. They lived at Kentfield, California in Marin County of San Francisco, and after their mother's death, Alice took on a surrogate mother role for the young John. John continued to travel regularly from Honolulu to San Francisco through the 1930s. At 19, Cooke employed the Ouija board at Kentfield with his sister, who was also mystically inclined. He would continue to use the Ouija board for at least the next thirty years.

At this age, Cooke was also a dancer and actor in Hollywood. He moved permanently from Hawaii to California after July 1940.

== 1940s and early 1950s ==
In 1943 on advice from the Ouija board, Cooke married Wilma Dorothy Vermilyea. Millen Cooke, as she became known, was a poet, writer, and occultist who had a poem published in 1936 in Weird Tales, but was most active between May 1946 and May 1950, with stories and essays appearing in Amazing Stories, Fantastic Fiction, and Other Worlds Science Stories. She had written a number of letters to American Theosophist in the early 1940s. John Starr Cooke was also published in American Theosophist in August 1945 with a story called "Black Magic Question Mark".

In 1944 John's father Clarence Hyde Cooke died, and John and Millen Cooke traveled the world, including a mission to go as far north and as far south as possible. On these travels, John Cooke met an assortment of gurus, mystics and spiritual figures, including Meher Baba. Cooke also studied medieval Tarot decks in museums, and spent considerable time living in London. Millen Cooke had a series of visions which John Cooke drew and was later known as the Atlantean Tarot (published 1992).

In 1948, John Cooke learned that Meher Baba was seeking to establish an ashram in California, and he assisted the group to purchase Meher Mount in the Ojai Valley. In 1950 a pregnant Millen Cooke (and with John denying paternity) read Dianetics by L. Ron Hubbard, first published in Astounding Science Fiction in May 1950. Millen Cooke was so enthusiastic about the ideas she encountered that she flew at once and alone to New York. John was enraged to find his wife had left and drove virtually non-stop for a day and a half to find her.

In New York Cooke quickly became a master of the techniques given in Dianetics, and subsequently met Mary Oser, who had flown to New York from Switzerland seeking a competent practitioner of Dianetics to treat her husband.

Mary Oser (née Wilbur) had attended Reed College in Oregon where she met fellow student Peter Oser, a great-grandson of John D. Rockefeller. They were married after he had proposed several times and they relocated to the Oser family's home city of Basel, Switzerland. Soon after John Cooke met Mary Oser he returned with her to Switzerland and lived with the Oser household in Basel, practicing the methods of Dianetics. Peter Oser became a blind follower of John Cooke.

In December 1950 the Oser family moved suddenly to central Africa, led by Cooke and his communications with the Ouija board.

In 1951 John Cooke and Millen Cooke were divorced, and their daughter Valerie Melza Cooke was born. Around this time, Peter Oser and Mary Oser were also divorced. In 1952 John Cooke married Mary.

== Northern Africa ca. 1952–1956 ==
Cooke and his new wife Mary traveled together throughout northern Africa on vision quests. Although he never considered himself a Muslim, John became associated with a Sufi sect amongst whom he was regarded as "a great healer and saint". On their travels the Cookes heard about Brion Gysin and his 1001 Nights Restaurant in Tangier.

Around mid-1955 they found Brion Gysin, having been sent across the Sahara by their Ouija board in search of him. Gysin later described Cooke as "a practising magician on a private income." John and Mary Cooke were soon regulars at Gysin's restaurant and became financially involved. Gysin later featured John and Mary Cooke in his novel The Process as Thay and Mya Himmer. According to Gysin, Cooke had a unique style of whirling Dervish dancing.

== The shoulder burn ==
In August 1956 the Cookes planned to move to Algiers and live in a renovated colonial villa; however, their plans changed after a mysterious encounter in a Tangier bank with family members of the Sufi sect. According to his sister Alice, as Cooke stood in the bank queue, a scarf was placed on his shoulders. As he left the bank, he suddenly tore the scarf off, due to a burning sensation on his shoulder, simultaneous with the feeling of a heavy blow to the base of the spine. He was thereafter paralysed and remained unable to use his legs properly for the rest of his life. In addition, he had a burn-like mark on his shoulder that remained with him for life.

The Cookes continued to Algiers as planned, but Mary called Gysin in Tangier for assistance. She paid him to close 1001 Nights for a time and in Algiers Gysin carried Cooke around on his back in search of medical help. Gysin also adopted Cooke's appearance of close-shaven head and goatee.

John and Mary Cooke sent word to L. Ron Hubbard in London to come and cure John. Hubbard couldn't come but sent his right-hand man "Lucky" Jim Skelton, an Australian Scientologist the Cookes had previously met in London. Gysin had also met Skelton in London. Skelton met with some success in reducing the paralysis, but complained to Hubbard that the method was not fully effective. Hubbard countered that Skelton was not performing the method correctly, which led Skelton to split from Hubbard and Scientology. In addition, Lucky Jim fell in love with both John and Mary and lived together with them.

John and Mary's son Chamba was born October 3, 1956. Soon after the birth, Mary decided that John was not stable enough to be a father to Chamba so she divorced him. Mary married Jim Skelton in July 1957.

After unsuccessful treatment in France and Denmark, John Cooke returned to the United States.

== Return to America ca. 1957 ==
Cooke returned to California either late in 1956 or during 1957. He was told he would eventually be able to walk with the aid of crutches; however, Cooke did not wish to become a spectacle and an object of pity, and chose instead the dignity of the wheelchair. He first stayed at a rehabilitation centre, then with Alice and Roger Kent at Kentfield until March 1958.

Cooke was looking for a cure for his paralysis. He was told by his friend John G. Bennett, a leading Gurdjieff follower, about an Indonesian religious leader, Pak Muhammed Subuh Sumohadiwidjojo, and the religious group Subud. Cooke would likely have heard of the apparently miraculous cancer cure of Hollywood actress Eva Bartok after she was "opened" in the Subud method in May 1957; the case was widely reported in the press in November 1957. Cooke agreed to finance Subuh's stopover in the US and, with his sister Alice Kent, greeted Subuh on his arrival in San Francisco on March 22, 1958. At around this time, Cooke moved to the Carmel highlands and his home became the Carmel headquarters for Subud.

== Carmel, California 1958–1963 ==
Around mid-1958, Cooke met the young San Francisco-based Beat artist Michael Bowen. Bowen's friend, fellow Beat artist Michael McCracken told him of a "real wizard" that he ought to check out and they went together to Cooke's Carmel home to see him. Cooke became particularly close to Michael Bowen and the two would work together until Cooke's death. The Subud devotees who had gathered around Cooke in 1958 formed the nucleus of a meditation group. The group met frequently and attracted many others. At the beginning of 1962 the meditation group received a general impression that "something" was coming. February 5, 1962, when seven planets were conjoined in Aquarius, was seen by some astrologers as the date of a worldwide catastrophe. Cooke's group had expected not a catastrophe but a change in consciousness affecting all of mankind.

Cooke's house was used by other groups as a venue to hold spiritually oriented workshops. Members of the Bahá'í faith visited Cooke at the Carmel highlands, perhaps a continuation of his earlier strong interest in the Bahá'ís. On the evening of August 17, 1962 a spontaneous Ouija board session took place at Carmel. Although the group of people present – Cooke, Bill Eaton, Nadine and Dean - had been meeting regularly to meditate, they had not previously together used the Ouija board. Cooke "just got out a big piece of paper and wrote the alphabet around and used a silver dollar."

John unsuccessfully tried Nadine and Dean as operators of the silver dollar planchette, but as soon as he paired with Bill Eaton "the board just….started whizzing around."

"The flow, once started, was unerring; there was no hesitation for a letter and no mistakes were made. Nadine began to record the letters as Bill Eaton read them off aloud. The pace was so swift that no one could have followed the meaning if Nadine had not recorded."

The messages came in a torrent of letters that had to be later separated into words and sentences.

The group met again for another session on 29 August. They again communicated with the entity which later identified itself as “WE”, or “ONE”. The group continued to meet and hold Ouija sessions at Carmel every week or so for the next fifteen months. For each session they would draw up a new alphabet board and draw a different symbol in the middle.

== The New Tarot for the Aquarian Age ==
At the October 20, 1962 session, "ONE" introduced the New Tarot for the Aquarian Age, and described two of the new tarot trumps (or "Books"), the Nameless One and the Hanging Man. On 3 November more information was received concerning the Nameless One, and in the week following, Cooke painted it. For the next five months, descriptions of the remaining twenty Books were given by "ONE" and Cooke painted the images accordingly. On March 26, 1963 "ONE" gave the final New Tarot card description, although the ONE Ouija sessions continued. The Cooke group incorporated dozens of visitors into the ONE Ouija sessions, including local historian Rosalind Sharpe Wall, author of A Wild Coast and Lonely: Big Sur Pioneers, and Andrea Puharich, author of the 1959 book The Sacred Mushroom.

In April 1963 Cooke hosted David "Big Daddy" Bray, the Hawaiian Kahuna, now aged 73. A couple of months later a long-time member of Cooke's group, David M, went to Hawaii and was for a time the favoured disciple of Bray. Cooke found the many visitors to Carmel a burden, and in May 1963 considered a permanent move to Mexico to be relieved of this, as well as to reduce his living expenses.

Cooke attended a Subud conference when Pak Subuh came to San Francisco around September 1963. Cooke, as per Subud custom, asked for and received a new name from Subuh, Lionel. By this time the 1958 Subud group in Carmel had dwindled to only Cooke and Dean, who also attended the conference. The final ONE Ouija session at Carmel was held on 16 November 1963, and by the end of 1963, Cooke was living at Tepotzlan in Morelos, Mexico.

== Tepoztlan, Mexico 1963-1966 ==
Cooke led quite a social life in Mexico according to his sister Alice Kent, holding parties and hosting many guests from the United States.

In late 1963 Cooke welcomed Michael Bowen to his home in Tepoztlan, Mexico. In January 1964 Cooke presided over Bowen's initiatory ritual consumption of Datura stramonium, an age-old means of inducing visions. Subsequent to this transformative experience, Bowen spent two weeks in a coma at the American Hospital in Mexico City, after which Cooke nursed Bowen back to health in Tepoztlan.

When Bowen had recovered, Cooke sent him to New York, providing money and a place to stay in New York City. Cooke's aim was for Bowen to draw Dr Timothy Leary and his associates at Millbrook, New York into Cooke's circle of influence. Cooke had taken LSD in December 1962 and wished to find out whether Leary and his associates would, with LSD, create something positive or create more danger and damage for the future.

Bowen arrived in New York around April 1964 and was unable to find Leary until mid-1964. On Bowen's first trip to Millbrook (likely between June 1964 and October 1964), he took large copies of the New Tarot images that Cooke had painted. Leary was interested and Ralph Metzner was "immediately struck by their evocative force." Leary later referred to Cooke as "the great crippled wizard". Bowen paid a second visit to Millbrook around January 1965.

Bowen kept Cooke informed of the latest developments in the psychedelic movement. Bowen was part of a loose-knit group under the direction of Cooke called the Psychedelic Rangers. The individuals in this group were dispatched to areas where psychedelic culture was emerging in order to further the movement.

On May 28, 1965, the ONE Ouija sessions were re-convened at Tepotzlan when Rosalind Sharpe Wall and Bill Eaton came to visit Cooke. Bill Eaton stayed in Mexico and the ONE Ouija sessions continued sporadically for the next nine months.

In early January 1966 Cooke and Eaton flew up from Mexico and held a couple of ONE Ouija sessions in Bolinas, California.

On February 16, 1966, Cooke and Eaton held the final ONE Ouija session in Mexico.

In May 1966 Cooke directed Michael Bowen to return to San Francisco, where a psychedelic community was gathering force in the Haight Ashbury district. Bowen discovered the San Francisco Oracle and its editor Allen Cohen and became a member of the staff. Cooke was later published in issue number nine in an essay beginning "ONE – that Great Architect of the Universes – designed a single Design."

== Tepoztlan, 1967-1976 ==
In early 1967 Cooke formed the Church of ONE. The Church of ONE was represented at a press conference held in Haight Ashbury on April 5, 1967, for "The Council for the Summer of Love". Other members of the Church of ONE included Rosalind Sharpe Wall and Michael Bowen.

In mid-1967 Michael Bowen left Haight Ashbury and returned to Mexico where he lived with Cooke in Tepoztlan.

In October 1967 Cooke gave Bowen money to fly from Mexico to New York. The anti-war March on the Pentagon was being threatened by radical elements seeking confrontation. In New York, Bowen raised further money from Peggy Hitchcock, drove to Washington and purchased thousands of daisies. Some of these flowers were photographed in the gun-barrels of the soldiers protecting the Pentagon, and this image became iconic of the Sixties. Bowen again spoke to Cooke after the event.

During 1968, the 22 New Tarot images were published as large meditation posters. In December 1968 T: The New Tarot, a book by Cooke and Rosalind Sharpe Wall, was published.

In April 1969 Cooke and his partner Pablo flew to California for a final Ouija session. Bill Eaton, Rosalind Sharpe Wall, and four others attended, including Dr. Ralph Metzner, who wrote an introduction to T: the New Tarot.

In September 1969 the complete 78-card New Tarot for the Aquarian Age was issued as a box set, with an instruction booklet and a revised version of T: The New Tarot. The box set was re-issued in April 1970 and July 1970.

By the 1970s the mysterious burn on Cooke's shoulder, despite coming and going over the years, remained an open sore. He had previously travelled to the US for two unsuccessful operations to have it closed up, where the ailment was diagnosed as skin cancer. On a third occasion he was told the wound was too deep for surgery and that nothing more could be done. In due course, the cancer would cut through an artery in his neck and he would bleed to death.

Cooke continued to practice magic and to teach ONE consciousness, attracting new students as well as old. Michael Bowen paid a final visit in 1973. In 1974, Rosalind Sharpe Wall issued the ONE Ouija session transcripts as "The Word of One".

As John grew weaker, Alice went down to Mexico to care for him.

In early 1976 Cooke became the basis of a film Prophecy of the Royal Maze, which showed him doing a New Tarot reading for the Aquarian Age. By this time he was in great pain from a swollen hand caused by the cancer in his shoulder moving down his arm. He saw a preliminary version of the film a few nights before he died but the film was not completed for another year.

Cooke died August 21, 1976, aged 56.

Prophesy of the Royal Maze was released 21 June 1978 and screened in Los Angeles, San Francisco, New York, London, and Honolulu.

== After death ==
In 1979 Alice Kent issued Communify, a New Tarot-based board game that she had devised with Cooke.

In 1992 Alice Kent re-issued the New Tarot as part of a box set which included the Atlantean Tarot and the Medieval Tarot.
