= Napua Stevens =

American singer

- Stevens presenting the annual Kamehameha Day for KITV in the 1970s
- Born: Harriet Daisy Kawaiala Kao'ionapuapi'ilani Stevens; August 31, 1918
- Died: January 7, 1990 (aged 71)
- Spouse: Gordon Hunter Poire

Napua Stevens Poire (born Harriet Daisy Kawaiala Kao'ionapuaopi'ilani Stevens; August 31, 1918 – January 7, 1990) was a Hawaiian entertainer, singer, hula dancer, musician, teacher, radio-television personality, event producer and author. Noted for her hits such as "Beyond The Reef" and "Hawaiian Hospitality" in the late 1940s, in the 1950s, and later embarked upon a successful media career as a radio DJ for her own show on KTRG and presenting her own TV cooking show Napua's Kitchen in the 1960s. She made two guest appearances in the popular series Hawaii Five-O and also presented the Aloha Week and Kamehameha Day hula shows.

== Biography ==
Stevens was born on August 31, 1918, in Hawi, North Kohala, Hawaii. She was a descendant of Charles Stevens, an American whaler who arrived in Hawaii in the 1840s. She was born one of six children of Robert Naea Stevens and Julia Kaaoaolahilahiokeohokalole Bell. Her name Napua was a shortened version of her name Kawaiala Kao'ionapuaopi'ilani which means "the perfumed water" and "the finest flower in the bouquet of Pi'ilani. She was of Scots and Native Hawaiian ancestry and was a descendant of ancient Native Hawaiian kings.

In 1949 she recorded Beyond The Reef on the Bell Records label (like her other hits), written by Canadian Jack Pitman. It was later recorded by Bing Crosby, Elvis Presley and The Ventures. Other notable hits include "Hawaiian Hospitality", "I Want to Learn to Speak Hawaiian", "Pretty Red Hibiscus", "May Day is Lei Day in Hawaii" and "What Aloha Means". In the hit "Hawaiian Hospitality" she sings of meeting a handsome dark-eyed local on Waikiki beach and his Hawaiian hospitality. In "I Want to Learn to Speak Hawaiian" she sings of her desire to learn the Hawaiian language so "she can say the sweetest things and do the hula too."

In 1948 she joined the Aloha Week organization and was responsible for producing and narrating hundreds of hula shows, with performers such as Daddy Bray, Bill Ali'iloa Lincoln, Vickie I'i Rodrigues (her cousin) and others. In the 1950s she hosted her own radio show on KTRG and presented her own TV cooking show, Napua's Kitchen in the 1960s for eight years. Stevens later made some appearances as an actress, including two episodes of Hawaii Five-O (1969–1973). She also narrated television coverage of the annual Kamehameha Day parade for years into the 1970s for KITV. Stevens was also talented at the crafts and in 1971 authored a book The Hawaiian Quilt which was an instruction/guide manual to the Hawaiian quilt.

== Personal life ==
In her prime she was described as being particularly physically attractive with one person commenting that "Napua was the loveliness of all Island girls in one, a ripe-mango beauty with raven hair and ivory skin". She was a cousin to Bill Ali'iloa Lincoln, another noted hula musician. Several people related to Napua Stevens are also successful musicians or entertainers in Hawaii.

She died on January 7, 1990, at the age of 71.
