= The Process (novel) =

Brion Gysin 1969 novel

- First edition
- Author: Brion Gysin
- Language: English
- Genre: Novel
- Publisher: Doubleday
- Publication date: 1969
- Publication place: United States
- Media type: Print (Hardcover and Paperback)
- ISBN: 0-87951-297-0 (1987 ed.)
- OCLC: 233583857

The Process is a novel by Brion Gysin which was published in 1969. Gysin was a painter and composer, and also collaborated with Beat Generation author William S. Burroughs on many occasions. The Process was his first full-length novel.

Described by The Overlook Press (which published a posthumous edition in 1987) as "a powerfully psychological novel", The Process tells the story of a professor named Ulys O. Hanson who sets out on a pilgrimage across the Sahara Desert which turns out to be a hallucinatory experience.

The Process is notable not only for its evocative and poetic descriptions of the Sahara Desert and Sufi culture, but also for the history it documents - most notably, Gysin's encounters with L. Ron Hubbard and The Master Musicians of Jajouka.

The Process features Thay and Mya Himmer, who are based on John and Mary Cooke, a couple who financed Gysin's 1001 Nights restaurant in Tangier. John Starr Cooke gave Gysin the large emerald which features as the Seal of the Sahara.

== Reception ==
The book, using a cut-up technique, got mixed reception including many attacks and few actual reviews. Geiger wrote "The Process is undeniably an important book. It is original in conception and its construction—derived from Gysin's own experiments with the Uher tape recorder." Mary McCarthy found it "a remarkable first work", but it was "skewered" in Vogue, and another reviewer called it a "lengthy experimental white elephant". William S. Burroughs endorsed it, calling it "first class entertainment". Gysin himself described the book as "a wild tale of adventure in the Sahara, on one level, and the story of a search for self, on the other."
