= Book of Habakkuk =

Book of the Bible

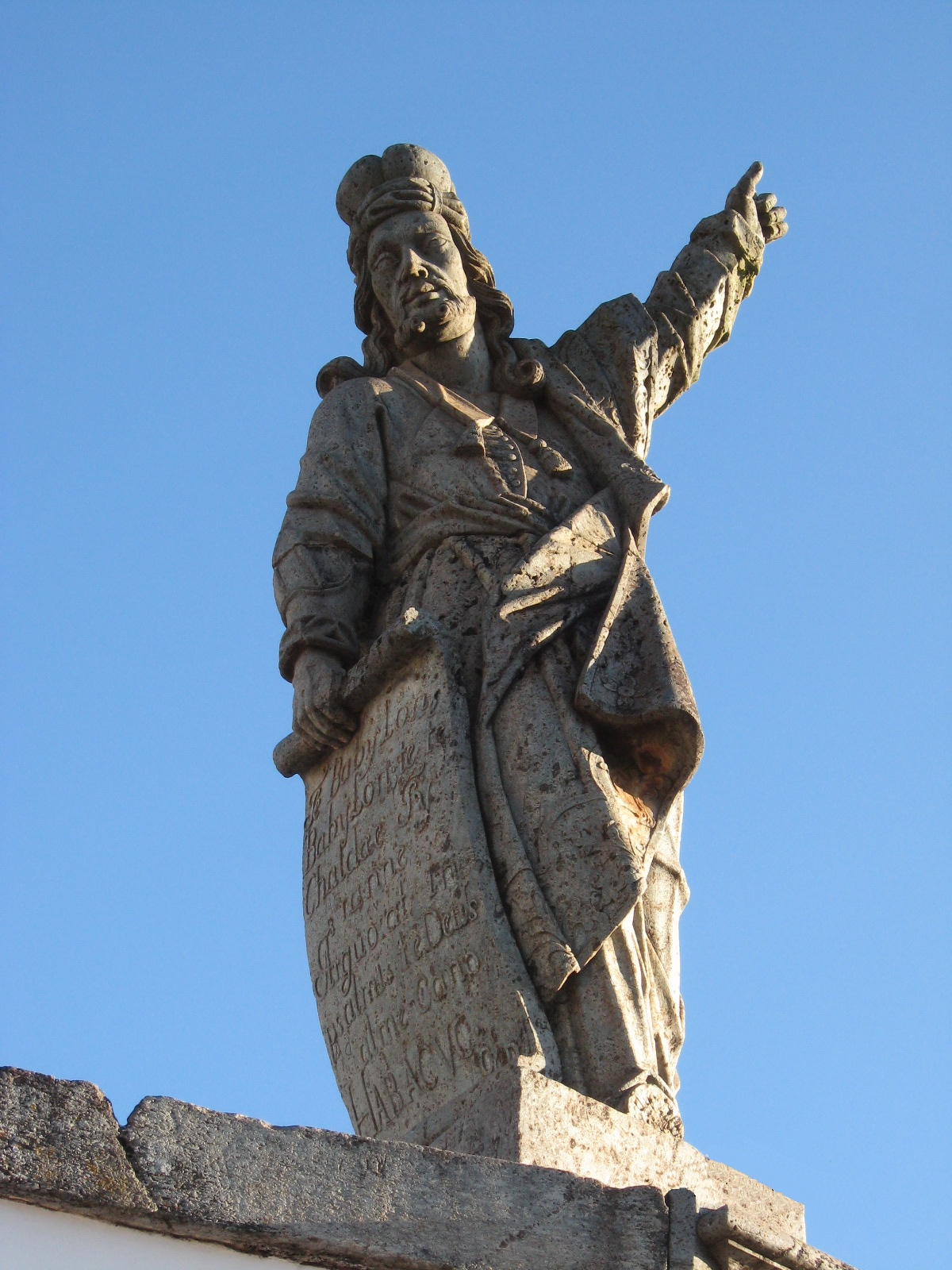
Image of Habakkuk

The Book of Habakkuk is the eighth book of the Twelve Minor Prophets of the Hebrew Bible. The book has three chapters. It is attributed to the prophet Habakkuk. Most scholars agree that the book’s content best aligns with the period during Jehoiakim's reign as king of Judah (609–597 BC). It is an important text in Judaism, and passages from the book are quoted by authors of the New Testament. Its message has inspired modern Christian hymn writers.

Of the three chapters in the book, the first two are a dialogue between Yahweh and the prophet. Verse 4 in chapter 2, stating that "the just shall live by his faith", plays an important role in Christian thought. It is used in the Epistle to the Romans, Epistle to the Galatians, and the Epistle to the Hebrews as the starting point of the concept of faith. A copy of these two chapters is included in the Habakkuk Commentary, found among the Dead Sea Scrolls. Chapter 3 is now recognized as a liturgical piece. It is debated whether chapter 3 and the first two chapters were written by the same author.

== Background ==
The prophet Habakkuk is generally believed to have written his book in the mid-to-late 7th century BC. It was likely written shortly after the Battle of Nineveh (612 BC) established the Neo-Babylonian Empire but before the Babylonian Siege of Jerusalem (587 BC) and subsequent Babylonian captivity.

=== Author ===
In the opening verse, Habakkuk identifies himself as a prophet. Due to the liturgical nature of Habakkuk's book, some scholars think that the author may have been a temple prophet. Temple prophets are described in 1 Chronicles 25:1 as using lyres, harps and cymbals. Some feel that this is echoed in Habakkuk 3:19b, and that Habakkuk may have been a Levite and cantor in Solomon's Temple.

There is no biographical information on the prophet Habakkuk. The only canonical information that exists comes from the book that is named for him. His name comes either from the Hebrew word חבק (ḥavaq) meaning "embrace", or else from an Akkadian word hambakuku, for a kind of plant.

Although his name does not appear in any other part of the Bible, Rabbinic tradition holds Habakkuk to be the Shunammite woman's son, who was restored to life by Elisha in 2 Kings 4:16. The prophet Habakkuk is also mentioned in the narrative of Bel and the Dragon, part of the deuterocanonical additions to Daniel in a late section of that book. In the superscription of the Old Greek version, Habakkuk is called the son of Joshua of the tribe of Levi. In this book, Habakkuk is lifted by an angel to Babylon to provide Daniel with food while he is in the lion's den.

=== Historical context ===
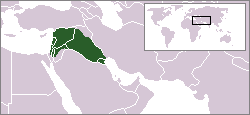
The Neo-Babylonian Empire c. 600 BC

It is unknown when Habakkuk lived and preached, but the reference to the rise and advance of the Neo-Babylonian Empire in 1:6–11 places him in the middle to last quarter of the 7th century BC. One possible period might be during the reign of Jehoiakim, from 609 to 598 BC. The Neo-Babylonian Empire was growing in power in this period. The Babylonians marched against Jerusalem in 598 BC. Jehoiakim died while the Babylonians marched towards Jerusalem, and Jehoiakim's eighteen-year-old son Jeconiah assumed the throne. Upon the Babylonians' arrival, Jehoiachin and his advisors quickly surrendered Jerusalem and Zedekiah was appointed as a puppet king. With the transition of rulers and the young age and inexperience of Jehoiachin, they could not stand against the Babylonian forces. There is a sense of an intimate knowledge of the Babylonian brutality in 1:12–17.

== Overview ==
The book of Habakkuk is a book of the Hebrew Bible and stands eighth in a section known as the Twelve Minor Prophets in the Masoretic Text and the Septuagint. In the Masoretic Text, it follows Nahum and precedes Zephaniah, who are considered to be his contemporaries.

The book consists of three chapters and it is neatly divided into three different genres:

- A discussion between God and Habakkuk
- An oracle of woe
- A psalm, "Habakkuk's song".

== Themes ==
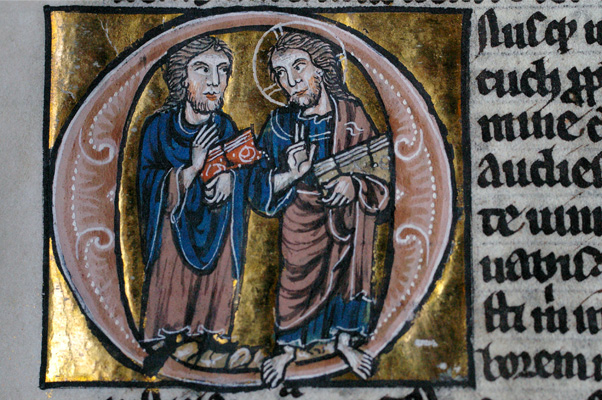
Habakkuk and God; Illuminated Bible from the 1220s, National Library of Portugal

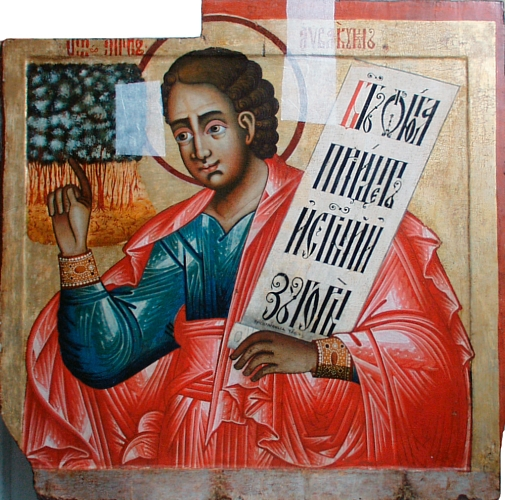
Prophet Habakkuk as imagined by an 18th-century Russian icon painter

The major theme of Habakkuk is trying to grow from a faith of perplexity and doubt to the height of absolute trust in God. Habakkuk addresses his concerns over the fact that God will use the Babylonian empire to execute judgment on Judah for their sins. – (Habakkuk 1:12)

Habakkuk openly questions the wisdom of God. In the first part of the first chapter, the Prophet sees the injustice among his people and asks why God does not take action. "Yahweh, how long will I cry, and you will not hear? I cry out to you “Violence!” and will you not save?" – (Habakkuk 1:2)

In the middle part of Chapter 1, God explains that he will send the Chaldeans (also known as the Babylonians) to punish his people. In 1:5: "Look among the nations, watch, and wonder marvelously; for I am working a work in your days, which you will not believe though it is told you." In 1:6: "For, behold, I raise up the Chaldeans, that bitter and hasty nation, that march through the breadth of the earth, to possess dwelling places that are not theirs."

One of the "Eighteen Emendations to the Hebrew Scriptures" appears at 1:12. According to the professional Jewish scribes, the Sopherim, the text of 1:12 was changed from "You [God] do not die" to "We shall not die". The Sopherim considered it disrespectful to say to God, "You do not die."

In the final part of the first chapter, the prophet expresses shock at God's choice of instrument for judgment, in 1:13: "You who have purer eyes than to see evil, and who cannot look on perversity, why do you tolerate those who deal treacherously, and keep silent when the wicked swallows up the man who is more righteous than he[...]?"

In Chapter 2, he awaits God's response to his challenge. God explains that He will also judge the Chaldeans, and much more harshly. "Because you have plundered many nations, all the remnant of the peoples will plunder you, because of men’s blood, and for the violence done to the land, to the city and to all who dwell in it. Woe to him who gets an evil gain for his house." (Habakkuk 2:8-9)

Finally, in Chapter 3, Habakkuk expresses his ultimate faith in God, even if he does not fully understand: "For though the fig tree doesn’t flourish, nor fruit be in the vines; the labor of the olive fails, the fields yield no food; the flocks are cut off from the fold, and there is no herd in the stalls: 3:18 yet I will rejoice in Yahweh. I will be joyful in the God of my salvation!" Some scholars suggest that the final chapter may be a later independent addition to the book, in part because it is not included among the Dead Sea Scrolls.

== Surviving early manuscripts ==
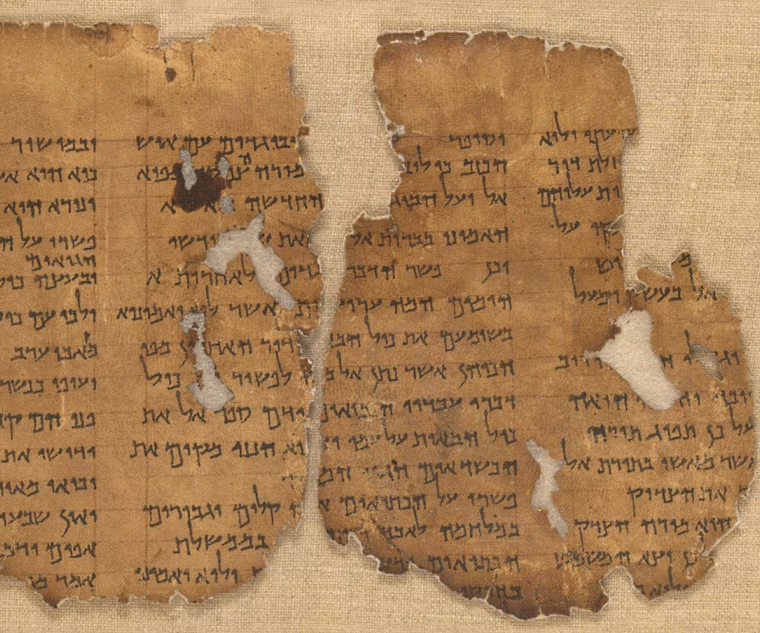
The beginning of Habakkuk Commentary, 1QpHab, found among the Dead Sea Scrolls from the 1st century BC.

Some early manuscripts containing the text of this book in Hebrew language are found among the Dead Sea Scrolls, i.e., 1QpHab, known as the "Habakkuk Commentary" (later half of the 1st century BC), and of the Masoretic Text tradition, which includes Codex Cairensis (895 CE), the Petersburg Codex of the Prophets (916), Aleppo Codex (10th century), Codex Leningradensis (1008). Fragments containing parts of this book in Hebrew were found among the Dead Sea Scrolls, including 4Q82 (4QXII^{g}; 25 BCE) with extant verses 4?; and Wadi Murabba'at Minor Prophets (Mur88; MurXIIProph; 75-100 CE) with extant verses 1:3–13, 1:15, 2:2–3, 2:5–11, 2:18–20, and 3:1–19.

There is also a translation into Koine Greek known as the Septuagint, made in the last few centuries BC. Extant ancient manuscripts of the Septuagint version include Codex Vaticanus (B; $\mathfrak{G}$^{B}; 4th century), Codex Sinaiticus (S; BHK: $\mathfrak{G}$^{S}; 4th century), Codex Alexandrinus (A; $\mathfrak{G}$^{A}; 5th century) and Codex Marchalianus (Q; $\mathfrak{G}$^{Q}; 6th century). Fragments containing parts of this book in Greek were also found among the Dead Sea Scrolls, that is, Naḥal Ḥever 8Ḥev1 (8ḤevXII^{gr}); (late 1st century BCE) with extant verses 1:5–11, 1:14–17, 2:1–8, 2:13–20, and 3:8–15.

== Importance ==
The Book of Habakkuk is accepted as canonical by adherents of the Jewish and Christian faiths.

=== Judaism ===
The Book of Habakkuk is the eighth book of the Twelve Prophets of the Hebrew Bible, and this collection appears in all copies of texts of the Septuagint, the Ancient Greek translation of the Hebrew Bible completed by 132 BC. Likewise, the book of Sirach (or Ecclesiasticus), also written in the 2nd century BC, mentions "The Twelve Prophets".

A partial copy of Habakkuk itself is included in the Habakkuk Commentary, a pesher found among the original seven Dead Sea Scrolls discovered in 1947. The Commentary contains a copy of the first two chapters of Habakkuk, but not of the third chapter. The writer of the pesher draws a comparison between the Babylonian invasion of the original text and the Roman threat of the writer's own period. What is even more significant than the commentary in the pesher is the quoted text of Habakkuk itself. The divergences between the Hebrew text of the scroll and the standard Masoretic Text are startlingly minimal. The biggest differences are word order, small grammatical variations, addition or omission of conjunctions, and spelling variations, but these are small enough not to damage the meaning of the text.

Some scholars suggest that Chapter 3 may be a later independent addition to the book, in part because it is not included among the Dead Sea Scrolls. However, this chapter does appear in all copies of the Septuagint, as well as in texts from as early as the 3rd century BC. This final chapter is a poetic praise of God, and has some similarities with Exodus 19, and with texts found in the Book of Daniel. However, the fact that the third chapter is written in a different style, as a liturgical piece, does not necessarily mean that Habakkuk was not also its author.

=== Qumran community ===
A commentary on the first two chapters of the book was found among the Dead Sea Scrolls at Qumran. The omission of chapter 3 from the version within the Dead Sea Scrolls has been attributed to incompatibilities with the theology of the Qumran sect.

== Habakkuk 2:4 ==
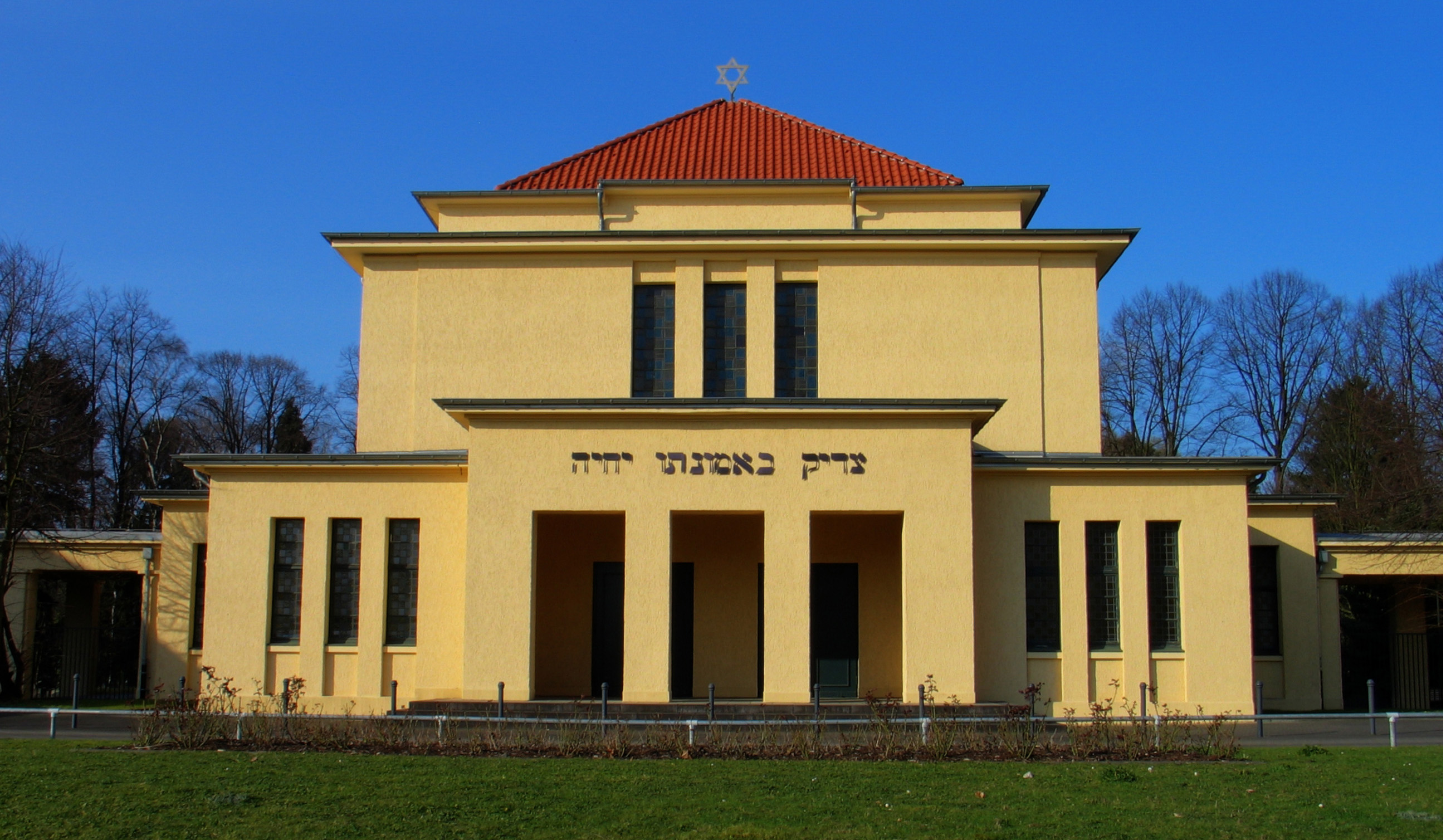
Habakkuk 2:4b quoted in a Jewish cemetery in Cologne: "the righteous will live by his faith."

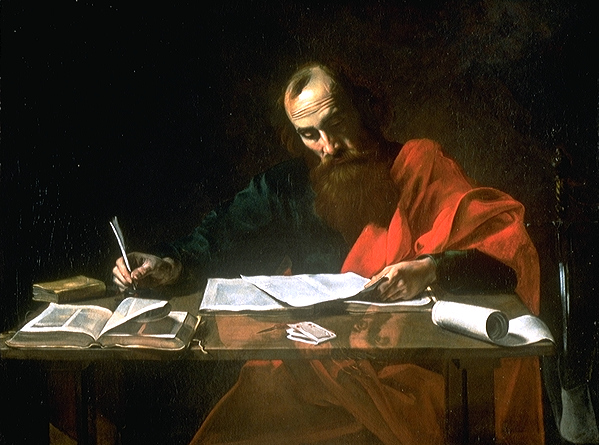
Saint Paul Writing His Epistles, 16th-century painting

The Talmud (Makkot 24a) mentions that various Biblical figures grouped the 613 commandments into categories that encapsulated all of the 613. At the end of this discussion, the Talmud concludes, "Habakkuk came and established [the 613 mitzvoth] upon one, as it is stated: 'But the righteous person shall live by his faith' (Habakkuk 2:4)".

Habakkuk 2:4 is well known in Christianity. In the New International Version of the bible it reads:

See, the enemy is puffed up; his desires are not upright

but the righteous person will live by his faithfulness.

Although the second half of this passage is only three words in the original Hebrew, (Note: The Hebrew text is וְצַדִּיק בֶּאֱמוּנָתוֹ יִחְיֶה) it is quoted three times in the New Testament. Paul the Apostle quotes it once in his Epistle to the Romans, and again in his Epistle to the Galatians; its third use is in the Epistle to the Hebrews. It became one of the most important of the verses that were used as foundations of the doctrines of the Protestant reformation.

There is controversy about the translation of the verse: the word "emunah" is most often translated as "faithfulness", though the word in this verse has been traditionally translated as "faith".

The word "emunah" is not translated as "belief" other than in Habakkuk 2:4, Clendenen, E. Ray defended the translation of the word as "faith" on the basis of the context of the verse, arguing that it refers to Genesis 15:6, which used the word "he’ĕmin" 'believed' of which "’ĕmȗnāh" is derived from, he also argued that the Essenes in the Qumran community likely understood the verse as referring to faith in the Teacher of Righteousness instead of faithfulness.

Martin Luther believed that Habakkuk 2:4 taught the doctrine of faith alone, commenting on the verse "For this is a general saying applicable to all of God's words. These must be believed, whether spoken at the beginning, middle, or end of the world".

Rashi interpreted the verse to be about Jeconiah.

The Targum interpreted the verse as "The wicked think that all these things are not so, but the righteous live by the truth of them".

Pseudo-Ignatius understood the verse to be about faith.

== Habakkuk 2:6-20: the taunting riddle ==
The melitzah ḥidah, or the taunting riddle, is the oracle revealed to Habakkuk the prophet. It is a mashal, which is a proverb and a parable. It is also known as a witty satire, a mocking and an enigma. The riddle is 15 verses long, from verse 6 to verse 20, and is divided into five woes. The first four woes consist of three verses each. Verse 18 is the pun and verse 20 is the challenge.

=== Hebrew text ===
The following table shows the Hebrew text of Habakkuk 2:6-20 with vowels alongside an English translation based upon the JPS 1917 translation (now in the public domain).

Verse	Hebrew text	English translation (JPS 1917)
6	הֲלוֹא־אֵ֣לֶּה כֻלָּ֗ם עָלָיו֙ מָשָׁ֣ל יִשָּׂ֔אוּ וּמְלִיצָ֖ה חִיד֣וֹת ל֑וֹ וְיֹאמַ֗ר ה֚וֹי הַמַּרְבֶּ֣ה לֹּא־ל֔וֹ עַד־מָתַ֕י וּמַכְבִּ֥יד עָלָ֖יו עַבְטִֽיט׃	Shall not all these take up a parable against him, And a taunting riddle against him, And say: ‘Woe to him that increaseth that which is not his! How long? and that ladeth himself with many pledges!
7	הֲל֣וֹא פֶ֗תַע יָק֙וּמוּ֙ נֹֽשְׁכֶ֔יךָ וְיִקְצ֖וּ מְזַעְזְעֶ֑יךָ וְהָיִ֥יתָ לִמְשִׁסּ֖וֹת לָֽמוֹ׃	Shall they not rise up suddenly that shall exact interest of thee, And awake that shall violently shake thee, And thou shalt be for booties unto them?
8	כִּֽי־אַתָּ֤ה שַׁלּ֙וֹתָ֙ גּוֹיִ֣ם רַבִּ֔ים יְשָׁלּ֖וּךָ כׇּל־יֶ֣תֶר עַמִּ֑ים מִדְּמֵ֤י אָדָם֙ וַֽחֲמַס־אֶ֔רֶץ קִרְיָ֖ה וְכׇל־יֹ֥שְׁבֵי בָֽהּ׃ {פ}	Because thou hast spoiled many nations, All the remnant of the peoples shall spoil thee; Because of men's blood, and for the violence done to the land, To the city and to all that dwell therein.
9	ה֗וֹי בֹּצֵ֛עַ בֶּ֥צַע רָ֖ע לְבֵית֑וֹ לָשׂ֤וּם בַּמָּרוֹם֙ קִנּ֔וֹ לְהִנָּצֵ֖ל מִכַּף־רָֽע׃	Woe to him that gaineth evil gains for his house, That he may set his nest on high, That he may be delivered from the power of evil!
10	יָעַ֥צְתָּ בֹּ֖שֶׁת לְבֵיתֶ֑ךָ קְצוֹת־עַמִּ֥ים רַבִּ֖ים וְחוֹטֵ֥א נַפְשֶֽׁךָ׃	Thou hast devised shame to thy house, By cutting off many peoples, And hast forfeited thy life.
11	כִּי־אֶ֖בֶן מִקִּ֣יר תִּזְעָ֑ק וְכָפִ֖יס מֵעֵ֥ץ יַעֲנֶֽנָּה׃ {פ}	For the stone shall cry out of the wall, And the beam out of the timber shall answer it.
12	ה֛וֹי בֹּנֶ֥ה עִ֖יר בְּדָמִ֑ים וְכוֹנֵ֥ן קִרְיָ֖ה בְּעַוְלָֽה׃	Woe to him that buildeth a town with blood, And establisheth a city by iniquity!
13	הֲל֣וֹא הִנֵּ֔ה מֵאֵ֖ת יְהֹוָ֣ה צְבָא֑וֹת וְיִֽיגְע֤וּ עַמִּים֙ בְּדֵי־אֵ֔שׁ וּלְאֻמִּ֖ים בְּדֵי־רִ֥יק יִעָֽפוּ׃	Behold, is it not of the LORD of hosts That the peoples labour for the fire, And the nations weary themselves for vanity?
14	כִּ֚י תִּמָּלֵ֣א הָאָ֔רֶץ לָדַ֖עַת אֶת־כְּב֣וֹד יְהֹוָ֑ה כַּמַּ֖יִם יְכַסּ֥וּ עַל־יָֽם׃ {פ}	For the earth shall be filled With the knowledge of the glory of the LORD, As the waters cover the sea.
15	ה֚וֹי מַשְׁקֵ֣ה רֵעֵ֔הוּ מְסַפֵּ֥חַ חֲמָתְךָ֖ וְאַ֣ף שַׁכֵּ֑ר לְמַ֥עַן הַבִּ֖יט עַל־מְעוֹרֵיהֶֽם׃	Woe unto him that giveth his neighbour drink, That puttest thy venom thereto, and makest him drunken also, That thou mayest look on their nakedness!
16	שָׂבַ֤עְתָּ קָלוֹן֙ מִכָּב֔וֹד שְׁתֵ֥ה גַם־אַ֖תָּה וְהֵעָרֵ֑ל תִּסּ֣וֹב עָלֶ֗יךָ כּ֚וֹס יְמִ֣ין יְהֹוָ֔ה וְקִיקָל֖וֹן עַל־כְּבוֹדֶֽךָ׃	Thou art filled with shame instead of glory, Drink thou also, and be uncovered; The cup of the LORD’S right hand shall be turned unto thee, And filthiness shall be upon thy glory.
17	כִּ֣י חֲמַ֤ס לְבָנוֹן֙ יְכַסֶּ֔ךָּ וְשֹׁ֥ד בְּהֵמ֖וֹת יְחִיתַ֑ן מִדְּמֵ֤י אָדָם֙ וַחֲמַס־אֶ֔רֶץ קִרְיָ֖ה וְכׇל־יֹ֥שְׁבֵי בָֽהּ׃	For the violence done to Lebanon shall cover thee, And the destruction of the beasts, which made them afraid; Because of men's blood, and for the violence done to the land, To the city and to all that dwell therein.
18	מָה־הוֹעִ֣יל פֶּ֗סֶל כִּ֤י פְסָלוֹ֙ יֹֽצְר֔וֹ מַסֵּכָ֖ה וּמ֣וֹרֶה שָּׁ֑קֶר כִּ֣י בָטַ֞ח יֹצֵ֤ר יִצְרוֹ֙ עָלָ֔יו לַעֲשׂ֖וֹת אֱלִילִ֥ים אִלְּמִֽים׃ {ס}	What profiteth the graven image, That the maker thereof hath graven it, Even the molten image, and the teacher of lies; That the maker of his work trusteth therein, To make dumb idols?
19	ה֣וֹי אֹמֵ֤ר לָעֵץ֙ הָקִ֔יצָה ע֖וּרִי לְאֶ֣בֶן דּוּמָ֑ם ה֣וּא יוֹרֶ֔ה הִנֵּה־ה֗וּא תָּפוּשׂ֙ זָהָ֣ב וָכֶ֔סֶף וְכׇל־ר֖וּחַ אֵ֥ין בְּקִרְבּֽוֹ׃	Woe unto him that saith to the wood: ‘Awake’, To the dumb stone: ‘Arise! ’ Can this teach? Behold, it is overlaid with gold and silver, And there is no breath at all in the midst of it.
20	וַיהֹוָ֖ה בְּהֵיכַ֣ל קׇדְשׁ֑וֹ הַ֥ס מִפָּנָ֖יו כׇּל־הָאָֽרֶץ׃ {ס}	But the LORD is in His holy temple; Let all the earth keep silence before Him.

== Habakkuk 3:1 ==
A prayer of Habakkuk the prophet, according to Shigionoth.

This verse is a heading for the final chapter. The exact meaning of "Shigionoth" is not known. The New Living Translation treats the word as an addition in the Hebrew text which "probably" indicates the prayer's musical setting, and the Jerusalem Bible suggests that the prayer adopts "the tone as for dirges".

== Musical uses ==
Modern Christian hymns have been inspired by the words of the prophet Habakkuk:

- the Christian hymn "The Lord is in His Holy Temple", written in 1900 by William J. Kirkpatrick, is based on Habakkuk 2:20.
- the fourth verse of William Cowper's hymn "Sometimes a Light Surprises", written in 1779, quotes Habakkuk 3:17–18:

Though vine nor fig-tree neither,
Their wonted fruit shall bear,
Though all the field should wither,
Nor flocks nor herds be there;
Yet God the same abiding,
His praise shall tune my voice,
For, while in Him confiding,
I cannot but rejoice.

— William Cowper, 1779

Irish composer Charles Villiers Stanford set slightly revised portions of text from the first and second chapters of Habakkuk in his choral composition for choir, soprano and tenor soloist and organ, "For Lo, I Raise Up".

== Citations ==
Book of Habakkuk Minor prophets
Preceded by Nahum	Hebrew Bible	Succeeded by Zephaniah
Preceded by Nahum	Christian; Old Testament	Succeeded by Zephaniah
