= Time (Burroughs book) =

Book by William S. Burroughs

- Author: William S. Burroughs
- Illustrator: Brion Gysin
- Publisher: "C" Press
- Publication date: 1965
- Media type: printed pamphlet
- Pages: 30

Time by William S. Burroughs, with illustrations by Brion Gysin, is a saddle stapled pamphlet described in its publisher's forward as "a book of words and pictures." It is an example of Burroughs' use of the cut-up technique, with which he began experimenting in the fall of 1959. It was published in New York in 1965 by "C" Press, a small publisher founded by the poet Ted Berrigan.

Burroughs took a dim view of newspapers and magazines generally, and Time magazine in particular. In an essay, "Ten Years and a Billion Dollars," he wrote:

Journalism is closer to the magical origins of writing than most fiction. That is, at least a few operators in this area—people like the late Hearst and Henry Luce [publisher of Time]—quite clearly and consciously saw journalism as a magical operation designed to bring about certain effects. And the technology is the technology of magic; in the case of newspapers and magazines, mostly black magic ... You can see how easy it is, if you own a newspaper, to start slipping in non-existent events; this has been and is being done all the time—by Time especially, in fact. Starting with being a week ahead, they literally write the news before it happens; which is why they print so many false statements that they have to retrct. And so you get a retraction from them—how many people read the retraction compared to the number who have read the falsified story?

In 1965, Burroughs put together his own rendition of Time, its cover a collage of the magazine's November 30, 1962 cover and an unidentified painting with Burroughs's name across its top. This was the issue that had anonymously reviewed Burroughs's novel Naked Lunch, published in the United States earlier that month. The review panned the book as "the grotesque diary of Burroughs’ years as an addict," along with a personal attack, including a libel that got Burroughs, then living in London, a small court settlement.

A few of the pages, as well as a color rendition of the cover, appear in the Los Angeles County Museum of Art (LACMA) catalog of their exhibit, Ports of Entry: William S. Burroughs and the Arts." The LACMA catalog describes Burroughs's Time as:

twenty-six pages of typescripts comprised of cut-up texts and various photographs serving as news items. One of the pages is from an article on Red China from Time of September 13, 1963, and is collaged with a columnal typescript and an irrelevant illustration from the "Modern Living" section of the magazine. A full-page advertisement for Johns-Manville products is casually inserted amid all these texts; its title: "Filtering."

At 28 cm, the page size more or less reproduces that of Time. The saddle staples are in the middle, between #3 and #4 of the four Brion Gysin illustrations." Some of the text is in columns, while other parts are full width; portions are in full width stanzas.
