= Tangerinn =

Bar in Tangier, Morocco

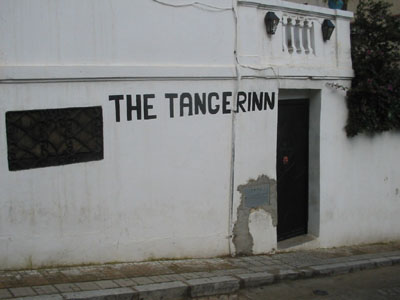
Tangerinn

The Tangerinn is a bar in Tangier, Morocco, a place of nostalgia for fans of Beat Generation or beatnik poets. The bar is adjoined to the Hotel El Muniria where author William S. Burroughs wrote his famous 1959 novel Naked Lunch in room #9. Pictures of Beat Generation poets such as Allen Ginsberg and Jack Kerouac hang on the walls.
