= David Bray =

David Bray may refer to:

- David A. Bray, distinguished fellow and Loomis Council Co-Chair with the Stimson Center, member of the National Academy of Public Administration (United States), and a senior executive who received the National Intelligence Exceptional Achievement Medal
- David Kaonohiokala Bray (1889–1968), kahuna in Hawaii
