= The Third Mind =

Book by William S. Burroughs II

- 1978 paperback edition by Seaver Books
- Author: William S. Burroughs; Brion Gysin
- Language: English
- Genre: Beat, essay, short fiction
- Publisher: Viking Press
- Publication date: June 1976 (French edition); 1978 (English edition)
- Publication place: United States
- Media type: Print (hardback & paperback)
- ISBN: 0-394-17984-6 (1982 edition)
- OCLC: 8879225

The Third Mind is a book by Beat Generation novelist William S. Burroughs and artist/poet/novelist Brion Gysin. First published in a French-language edition in 1976, it was published in English in 1978. It contains numerous short fiction pieces as well as poetry by Gysin, and an interview with Burroughs. Some chapters had previously been published, in slightly different form, in various literary journals between 1960 and 1973.

The book is a combination of literary essays and writing showcasing the cut-up technique popularized by Burroughs and Gysin in the 1960s. Cut-ups involves taking texts, cutting the pages, and then rearranging and combining the pieces to form new narratives. The technique was adapted for filmmaking, as demonstrated by Burroughs and director Antony Balch in their early 1960s short film, The Cut-Ups.

== Contents ==
- "Proclaim Present Time Over" (in: The Award Avant-Garde Reader)
- "Let the Mice In" (in: Brion Gysin Let the Mice In (1973))
- "The Cut-up Method of Brion Gysin" (in: A Casebook on the Beat)
- "Cut-ups Self-Explained," "Cut-ups: A Project for Disastrous Success," and "Fold-ins" (in: Evergreen Review)
- "The Exterminator" (in: The Exterminator (1960))
- "Formats: The Grid" (in: Insect Trust Gazette)
- "Films" (in: Mayfair)
- "First Cut-ups" and "Intersection Readings" (in: Minutes to Go (1960))
- "Technical Deposition of the Virus Power" (in: Nova Express)
- "Interview with William S. Burroughs." (in:The Paris Review)
