= Bill Aliʻiloa Lincoln =

Hawaiian musician (1911–1989)

Bill Ali'iloa Lincoln (21 March 1911 – 9 September 1989) was a Hawaiian hula singer and musician, noted for his soaring falsetto.

He recorded under the Bell Records label with his group Bill Ali'iloa Lincoln and His Hawaiians. Their hits included "Ke Ala Nui Liliha", "Ku'u Lei Liliha", "Moku O Keawe", "My Yellow Ginger Lei" (1955) and "Mauna Loa".

John Kameaaloha Almeida was influential in launching Lincoln's career.

In 2008 a notable compilation of hits from the 1930s-1970s was released, Hawaii's Falsetto Poet, a title which referred to his nickname.

There is a Bill Lincoln Record Shop in Hawaii on 304 Lewers Street in Honolulu. The club where he performed is named La Hula Rhumba, located at 744 Lunalilo Street, also in the Hawaiian capital.

Lincoln received the Hawai'i Academy of Recording Arts Lifetime Achievement Award in 2005 and was inducted into the Hawaiian Music Hall of Fame in 2006.
