= Beyond the Reef =

"Beyond The Reef"

Song by Napua Stevens
- Songwriter: Jack Pitman

"Beyond The Reef" is a song written by Canadian Jack Pitman in Hawaii in 1948. It was first performed by Hawaiian artist Napua Stevens in 1949.

Although Pitman was living in Hawaii when he wrote it, "Beyond the Reef" does not contain any Hawaiian language words or any mention of Hawaii. It is a slow song in the key of C major with a 2-5-1 progression with D minor, G major and C major. It features the steel guitar as do many of the hapa-haole songs written during this period.

== Notable cover versions ==
- Bing Crosby recorded the song on 5 September 1950 and Crosby's recording reached No. 26 on the Billboard pop chart.
- Marty Robbins included the song on his 1957 album Song of the Islands.
- Andy Williams released a version on his 1959 album, To You Sweetheart, Aloha.
- George Greeley recorded an instrumental version of the song in 1960 on his Warner Bros. album, The Most Beautiful Music of Hawaii.
- The Ventures also recorded the song on their third album, Another Smash, in September 1961.
- Vic Damone included the song on his 1962 album Strange Enchantment.
- Burl Ives included the song on his 1965 album On the Beach at Waikiki.
- Elvis Presley recorded his version of the song on 27 May 1966 but this recording was only released on a boxset in 1980/1 and as the b-side to "It’s only love" released in 1970.
