= Naked Lunch =

1959 novel by William S. Burroughs

- 1959 Olympia Press edition, with original title
- Author: William S. Burroughs
- Language: English
- Genre: Science fiction; Surrealism
- Publisher: Olympia Press (Europe); Grove Press (US)
- Publication date: 1959
- Publication place: France
- Media type: Print (Hardcover & Paperback)
- ISBN: 978-3-548-02843-9 (reprint)
- OCLC: 69257438

Naked Lunch (first published as The Naked Lunch) is a 1959 antinovel by American author William S. Burroughs. The novel does not follow a clear linear plot, but is instead structured as a series of non-chronological "routines". Many of these routines follow William Lee, an opioid addict who travels to the surreal city of Interzone and begins working for the organization "Islam Inc."

Burroughs wrote Naked Lunch while living in the Tangier International Zone, which inspired the book's Interzone setting. There, he witnessed escalating tensions between European powers and the Moroccan Nationalist Movement, which are reflected in Interzone's fictional political struggles. Burroughs also struggled with opioid addiction, which the novel describes extensively, although critics disagree whether the novel uses opioids as a metaphor for broader forms of control.

The novel was highly controversial for its depictions of drug use, sadomasochism, and body horror, including a famous description of a man's talking anus taking over his body. The book was considered obscene by the United States Postal Service, the state of Massachusetts, and the city of Los Angeles, each leading to separate legal challenges. In the Massachusetts trial, now recognized as a landmark censorship case, defense attorney Edward de Grazia called writers such as Allen Ginsberg, John Ciardi, and Norman Mailer to testify to the book's literary merit. Although the court initially ruled the book was in fact obscene, this decision was overturned by the Massachusetts Supreme Judicial Court, which allowed the book to be sold.

Naked Lunch has received a divided critical response. The book's admirers have compared it to the satires of Jonathan Swift and the religious works of Dante Alighieri and Hieronymous Bosch. Its detractors have compared it to pornography, often calling it monotonous and boring. The book has been considered dystopian science fiction, postmodern, parodic, and picaresque. Its experimental techniques have been highly influential on rock music and the cyberpunk genre. Naked Lunch is considered one of the defining texts of the Beat Generation.

== Background ==
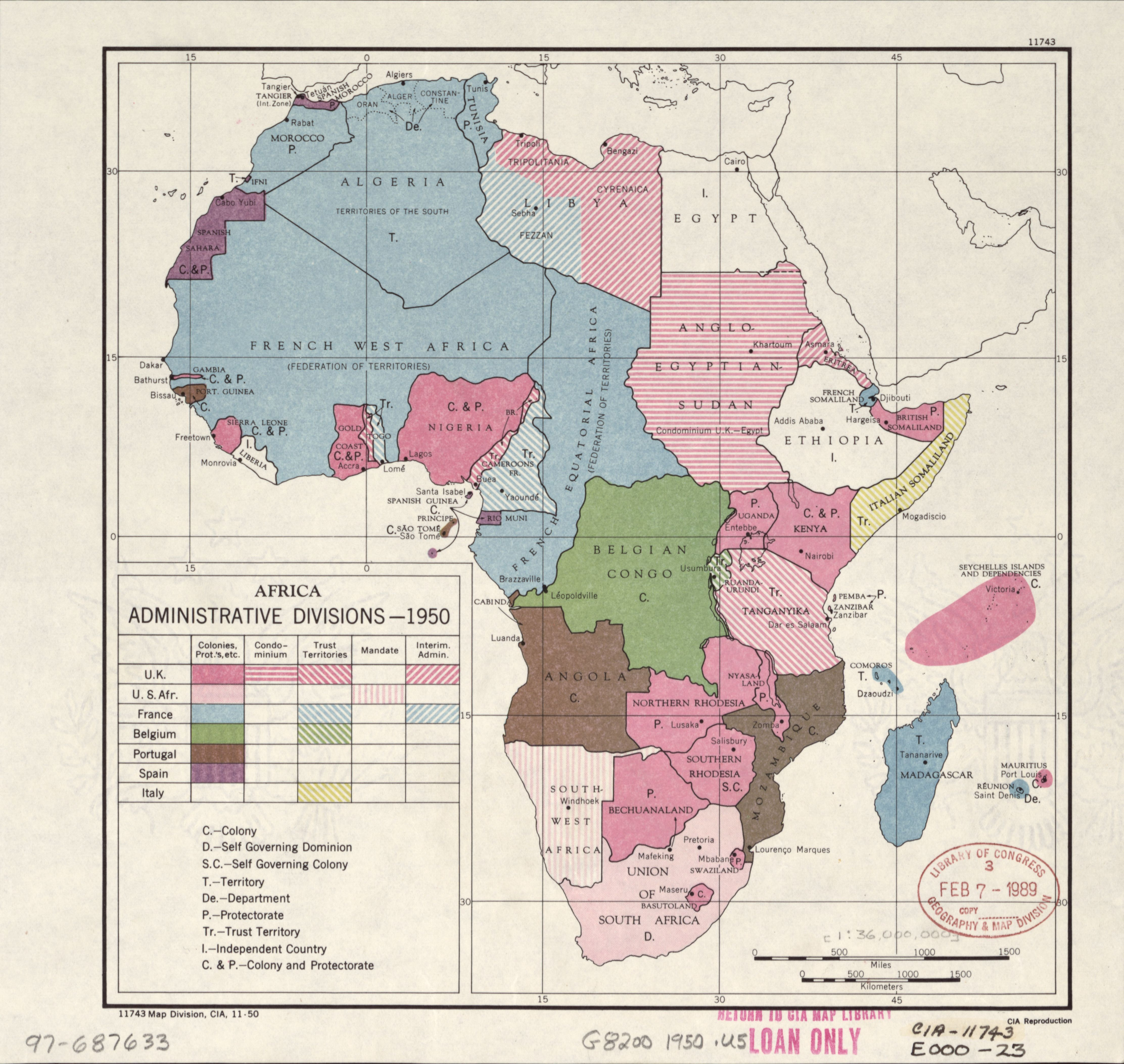
This 1950 map of Africa shows the Tangier International Zone in the Northwest, just below the Strait of Gibraltar. Today, the area is part of Morocco.

In 1923, European powers established the Tangier International Zone in Northern Morocco. To ensure the area's neutrality, the Zone was overseen by representatives from multiple European nations alongside the sultan of Morocco. This government was unable to effectively regulate drugs or prostitution, and American residents were not subject to Moroccan laws.

William S. Burroughs moved to the Tangier International Zone in 1954, shortly after the publication of his first novel Junkie. Burroughs was attracted by the zone's reputation for allowing drug use and homosexuality, as portrayed in the works of Paul Bowles, (Note: A minor character in the novel named Andrew Keif is directly based on Paul Bowles.) and declared his intention to "steep myself in vice". In Tangier, Burroughs became severely addicted to Eukodal, eventually using the drug every two hours. He had previously been addicted to heroin while writing Junkie. Burroughs also began a sexual relationship with a teenage boy named Kiki, which would last until Kiki's death in September 1957.

In May 1954, Burroughs began work on what would become Naked Lunch. He mailed his early drafts to his friends Allen Ginsberg and Jack Kerouac, who were the core members of the Beat Generation along with Burroughs himself. In a letter to Ginsberg, Burroughs explicitly identified Interzone as a stand-in for the Tangier International Zone. However, the novel's Interzone is also closely related to the fictional "Composite city" Burroughs described in his earlier The Yage Letters, which he wrote before visiting Tangier.

While living in Tangier, Burroughs witnessed violent clashes between Moroccan nationalists and French authorities over its political status. Burroughs did not take a strong stance on the conflict, at one point calling himself "the most politically neutral man in Africa". He defended the riots as just and denounced the brutality of European imperialism, but worried about the impact of Islamic rule on individual freedom.

In 1955, Burroughs attempted to quit Eukodol by checking himself into Benchimol Hospital, where his experiences helped inspire the character of Dr. Benway. (Note: An earlier version of Benway appeared in Burroughs' 1938 story "Twilight's Last Gleaming", in which he drunkenly performs surgery aboard a sinking ship.) In 1956, Burroughs successfully mitigated his drug dependency using apomorphine. Burroughs replaced his opioid use with cannabis, and continued writing sections of the novel and mailing them to Ginsberg. Burroughs later stated he "wrote nearly the whole of Naked Lunch on cannabis".

In early 1957, Kerouac and Ginsberg visited Burroughs in Tangier, where they helped Burroughs type his manuscript and assemble the fragments he had mailed them over the years. In the recollection of Paul Bowles, who met Burroughs in 1954,

Allen Ginsberg came in '57 and began to supervise the retrieving of the endangered manuscript of Naked Lunch, which was scattered all over the floor of Bill's room at the Muniriya. The pages had been lying here for many months, covered with grime, heelmarks, mouse-droppings. It was Alan Ansen who financed the expedition, and between them they salvaged the book.

However, Ginsberg worried the lack of character development or a clear narrative would make the book impossible to publish. That summer, Burroughs spent three weeks in Copenhagen, which inspired additional sections of the novel set in "Freeland".

== Publication history and legal challenges ==
In 1957, Allen Ginsberg submitted the Naked Lunch manuscript to Olympia Press, which had a reputation for publishing controversial novels such as Tropic of Cancer and Lolita. Olympia rejected the manuscript, arguing that it was inaccessible and lacked structure. Ginsberg then sent the manuscript to Irving Rosenthal, editor of the Chicago Review. Rosenthal published excerpts from the novel in the Review's Spring 1958 and Autumn 1958 issues. Jack Mabley, a columnist for the Chicago Daily News, publicly criticized the Chicago Review for publishing "obscenity". In response, the University of Chicago insisted that material from Burroughs and Jack Kerouac could not appear in the upcoming Winter issue. Irving Rosenthal resigned from the Review and founded a new literary magazine with Pete Carroll called Big Table, which published the suppressed material in its first issue.

=== Post Office hearing ===
Rosenthal and Carroll planned to mail the first issue of Big Table in March 1959. However, the US Post Office considered the magazine obscene, which made it un-mailable under the Comstock laws. On June 4, 1959, the Post Office launched a formal hearing over Big Table's obscenity, with a particular focus on Burroughs' Ten Episodes from Naked Lunch and a short story by Jack Keruoac titled "Old Angel Midnight".

Joel Sprayregen, Big Table's attorney, advocated for the magazine's literary value and insisted it was not obscene under the criteria established in Roth v. United States. Pete Carroll, the magazine's co-founder, testified that he considered Burroughs a satirist in the tradition of Jonathan Swift and Nathanael West and that his social criticism required vulgar language. William Duvall, the hearing examiner, admitted that Burroughs' work had some "intelligible satire", but felt its vulgarity outweighed any literary merit. He ruled that the magazine was in fact obscene and could not be mailed.

In February 1960, Big Table filed a federal complaint, arguing that the Post Office's decision violated the First Amendment. On June 30, 1960, the United States District Court for the Northern District of Illinois overturned the Post Office's findings. The Post Office did not appeal this decision.

=== European and American publication ===
Inspired by the attention around Big Table's excerpts, Olympia Press reconsidered its rejection and published the novel. Olympia first published the English-language Naked Lunch in France in July 1959.

Grove Press bought the American publication rights, and initially planned to exclude the chapters describing Hassan's "Rumpus Room" and A.J.'s party. Burroughs himself had called those sections "pornographic" and expected they would be cut from a US release, although he also felt they constituted a political argument against capital punishment. Ultimately, Grove decided to publish the novel uncensored, encouraged by the praise the book had received from Norman Mailer and Mary McCarthy. Naked Lunch was first published in the US on November 20, 1962, and sold over 14,000 copies in the first 4 months. The US edition included a new appendix by Burroughs titled "Deposition: Testimony Concerning a Sickness". Burroughs originally wrote the deposition in response to a legal hearing in Paris; the text asserts that he and his novel do not promote the use of drugs. Allen Ginsberg criticized this appendix; he found it overly moralizing and felt Burroughs was avoiding responsibility for his own work.

In 1962, the novel was translated into German, but the publishers intentionally left the most explicit sections in untranslated English. In 1964, it was published in the United Kingdom by John Calder. Calder avoided selling the book to wholesalers and only distributed small print runs at a high price to avoid legal attention and thus evade prosecution or censorship.

=== Boston Trial ===
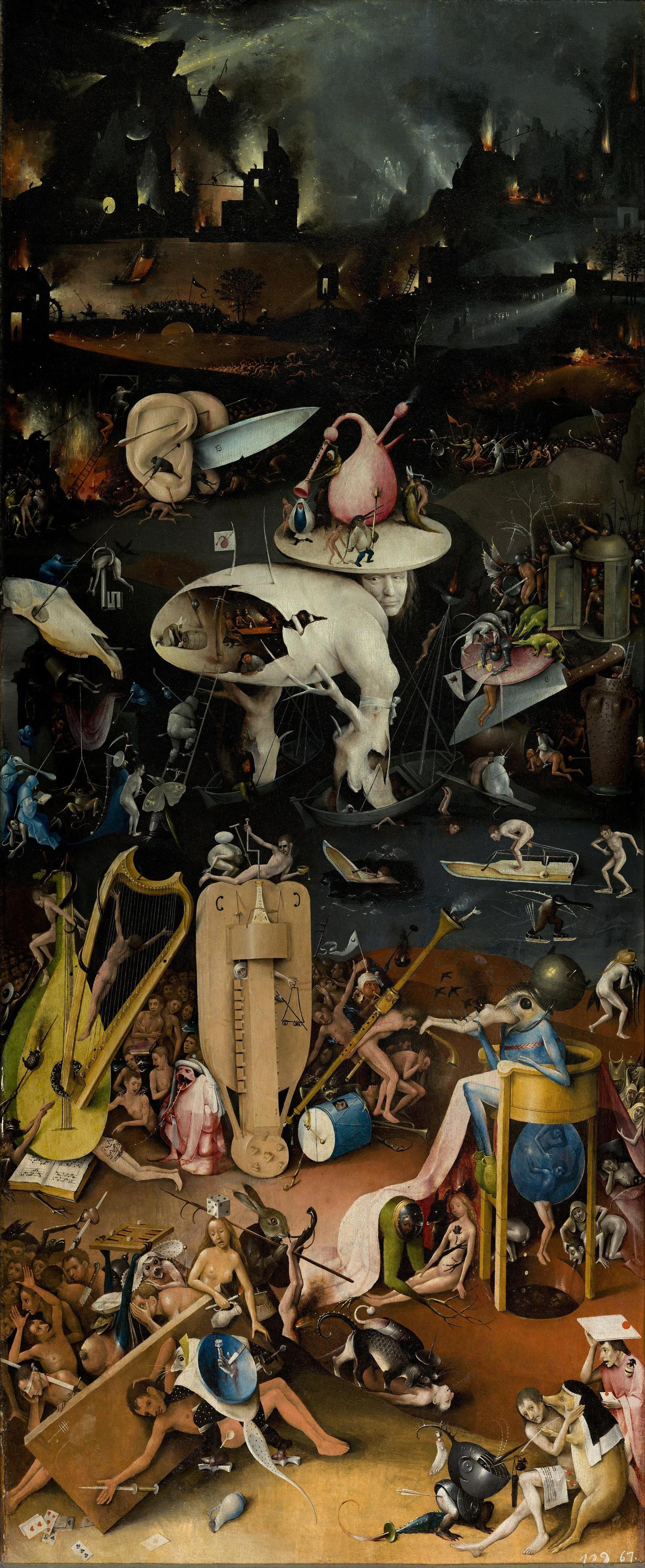
Hell as depicted by Hieronymous Bosch in The Garden of Earthly Delights. During the Boston trial, authors and professors compared Naked Lunch to the religious works of Bosch, Dante Alighieri, and Augustine of Hippo.

Naked Lunch was banned in Boston, and in January 1965 the novel was tried in rem. William Cowin represented the state of Massachusetts, while Edward de Grazia represented Grove Press. Cowin argued the book's vulgarity overwhelmed any literary value it had, and that nearly every page contained something obscene. His prosecution emphasized the novel's lack of structure, arguing that the most explicit passages could be judged in isolation without considering the book as a whole.

De Grazia called authors and professors to testify about the novel's social value and literary merit. Norman Mailer praised Burroughs' literary talent and defended the novel's structure by comparing it to Finnegans Wake. John Ciardi compared the book to a hellfire sermon akin to the works of Dante Alighieri and Hieronymous Bosch and argued its vulgarity was a key part of its effect. He also argued that Burroughs' uncontrolled writing process did not undermine the novel's artistry. Professor Norman Holland agreed with Ciardi's interpretation and suggested Augustine might have written a work like Naked Lunch if he were still alive. Professor Thomas Jackson also compared the novel's explicit passages to Dante Alighieri's scenes of cannibalism and scatology, and the novel's structure to Ezra Pound's Cantos and T.S. Eliot's The Waste Land. Paul Hollander argued the novel showcased the depravity of addiction, and John Sturrock suggested it helped readers understand drug-induced psychosis. Allen Ginsberg discussed the book as a metaphor for addiction in general, analyzed connections between the novel's depictions of sexuality and drugs, and read his poem "On Burroughs' Work" from the stand.

In his cross-examinations, William Cowin suggested the novel was anti-Catholic, quizzed the witnesses on whether they could remember its characters, and challenged them to interpret provocative passages like the talking anus scene. He did not call any witnesses to testify against the book.

On March 23, 1965, the court ruled that the novel was in fact obscene. Grove appealed this decision to the Massachusetts Supreme Judicial Court. On July 7, 1966, based on new obscenity guidelines from the United States Supreme Court in Memoirs v. Massachusetts, the state supreme court overturned the ban, arguing that the testimony had demonstrated the novel's social and literary value. In a dissent, Justice Paul Reardon insisted the book was "literary sewage".

Grove Press exploited the trial as a marketing strategy. Grove compared Naked Lunch to Ulysses, Lady Chatterley's Lover, and Tropic of Cancer, which had also been challenged for obscenity, and included transcripts of the court testimonies in a new edition of the book.

=== Los Angeles Trial ===
On January 28, 1965, the city of Los Angeles tried two people for selling copies of Naked Lunch, arguing they had violated California's obscenity statute. Municipal Judge Alan Campbell described the novel as "repugnant" and argued that the chapter describing A.J's Party may have qualified as obscene, but found that the book as a whole did not appeal to a "prurient interest" and therefore did not violate the statute. Instead, the judge wrote that "its predominant interest is to complete boredom".

== Plot summary ==
In New York City, William Lee hides from a narcotics agent. He and fellow heroin user Bill Gains agree that law enforcement has become too aggressive and decide to leave New York. Lee travels to Mexico City, wanders around Latin America, and finally settles in the surreal city of Interzone.

Lee finds that Interzone is centered around a black market of drugs and giant centipede meat, and its residents include monstrous creatures called Mugwumps. The city is contested by four rival political parties: Liquefactionists, who want to merge everyone into one protoplasmic entity; Senders, who want to control everyone else through telepathy; Divisionists, who subdivide into replicas of themselves; and Factualists, who oppose the other three.

A.J., a Factualist, and Hassan, a Liquefactionist, both support a mysterious organization called Islam Inc. This organization hires Lee to find and recruit the sociopathic Doctor Benway, who previously established a dystopian police state in Annexia. Lee meets Benway in Freeland, where he performs psychological experiments at a "Reconditioning Center". He agrees to work for Islam Inc. These events are interspersed with non-chronological vignettes about Lee's criminal history and drug use, A.J.'s and Hassan's sadomasochistic parties, Benway's unethical experiments, other characters' grotesque transformations, and abstract cut-up sequences with no clear narrative arc.

Back in New York, Lee shoots two police officers who try to arrest him, then calls the police department, which tells him those officers didn't exist. Lee considers himself "occluded from space-time" and believes he will no longer interact with the surreal world of Interzone.

The novel ends with an "Atrophied Preface" about the book itself, followed by a sequence of disjointed and impressionistic closing lines.

== Title ==
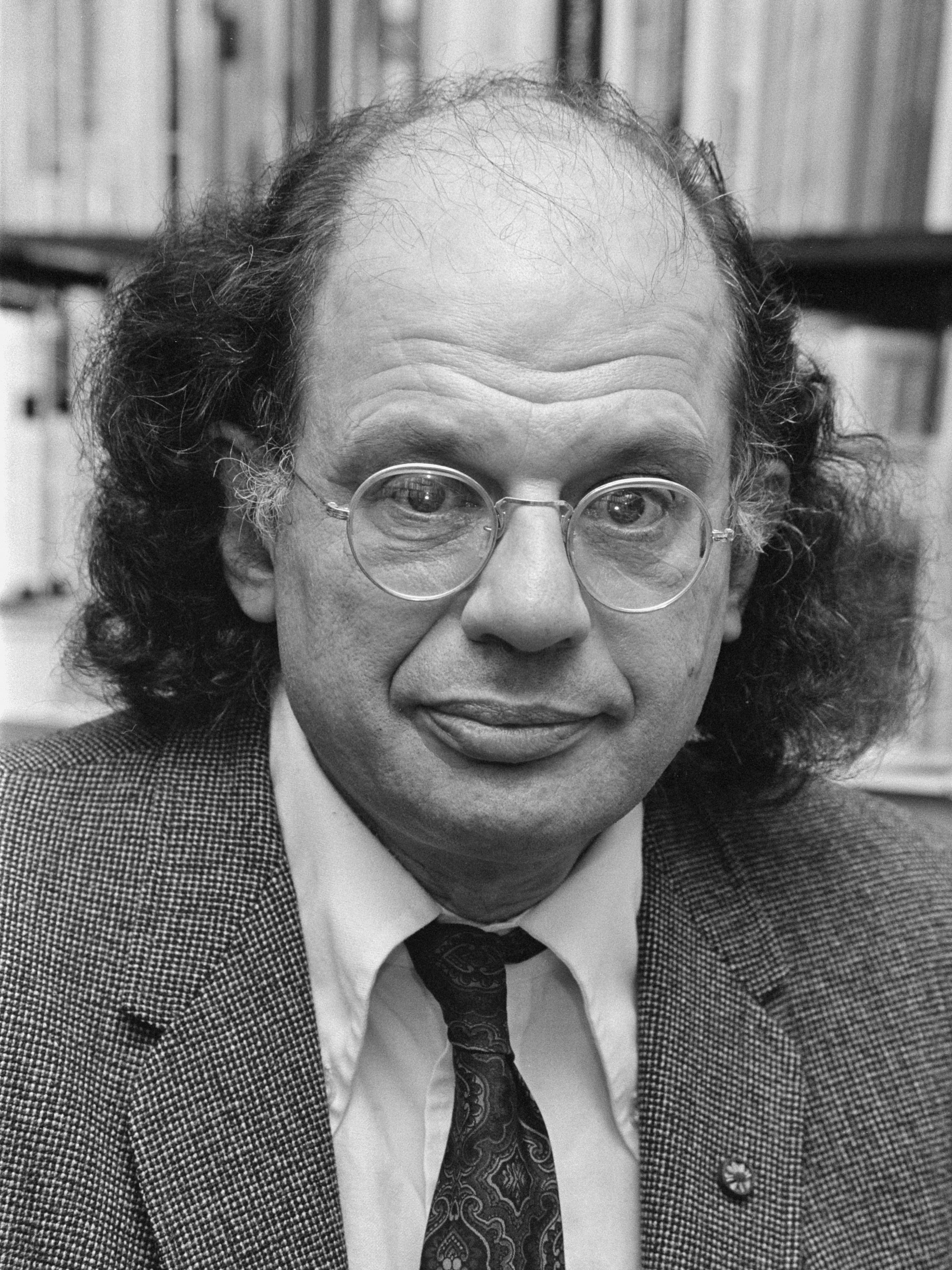
Allen Ginsberg (pictured in 1979) inadvertently coined the novel's title. Ginsberg later incorporated the title into a poem, which he read in court during one of the book's obscenity trials.

Burroughs originally called his manuscript Interzone. He also considered several titles involving the Sargasso Sea, including Meet Me in Sargasso and The Sargasso Trail, possibly inspired by William Hope Hodgson's Sargasso Sea Stories. (Note: Burroughs' own nickname for Tangier's Café Central was "The Sargasso", and near the end of the novel, the protagonist William Lee describes himself as "occluded from space-time like an eel's ass occludes when he stops eating on the way to the Sargasso".)

The term naked lunch began as a mangled quote from Burroughs' unfinished novel Queer. Allen Ginsberg misread the phrase "a leer of nakedlust wrenched" as "a leer of naked lunch", and Jack Kerouac encouraged Burroughs to use Ginsberg's version as a title. Burroughs originally planned to use the title for a compilation of three earlier works, before ultimately using it for his novel. Olympia Press first published the book as The Naked Lunch, but later editions removed the definite article.

Burroughs explained the title by saying it "means exactly what the words say: naked lunch, a frozen moment when everyone sees what is on the end of every fork." However scholarly research has also suggested Manet's Le Déjeuner sur l'herbe (The Luncheon on the Grass) of 1863 as Burroughs' inspiration for the title. Ginsberg interpreted the title in his poem On Burroughs' Work, published in the collection Reality Sandwiches:

A Naked Lunch is natural to us,
we eat reality sandwiches.
But allegories are so much lettuce.
Don't hide the madness.

— Allen Ginsberg, On Burroughs' Work

== Style ==
You can cut into Naked Lunch at any intersection point... I have written many prefaces. They atrophy and amputate spontaneous like the little toe amputates in a West African disease confined to the Negro race and the passing blonde shows her brass ankle as a manicured toe bounces across the club terrace, retrieved and laid at her feet by her Afghan hound...

Naked Lunch is a blueprint, a How-To Book... Black insect lusts open into vast other-planet landscapes... Abstract concepts, bare as algebra, narrow down to a black turd or a pair of aging cojones...

— Atrophied Preface, Naked Lunch

The majority of Naked Lunch does not follow any clear structure, chronology, or geography. Instead, it abruptly jumps between a series of loosely connected episodes (called "routines" by Burroughs), which can be read in any order. These routines are improvisational and often comedic, likely inspired by burlesque and vaudeville. Although the novel is book-ended with a realistic crime story, most of these routines are abstract and surreal, blurring any distinction between fantasy and reality. These routines are sporadically interrupted by parenthetical asides, which comment on or clarify the text. For example, when describing a scene as taking place "...under silent wings of the Anopheles mosquito," Burroughs adds the parenthetical "(Note: This is not a figure. Anopheles mosquitoes are silent.)" Many scenes are described as though on film, using the language of stage directions and editing techniques. This structure builds on that of Burroughs' incomplete previous novel Queer, which began as a conventional narrative before fragmenting into its own series of episodic routines.

Burroughs struggled to organize the routines into a coherent narrative. Brion Gysin, staying in Paris' Beat Hotel alongside Burroughs, suggested he view the work as a painting observed all at once rather than a traditional novel, which can only be read linearly. Following this advice, Burroughs mostly arranged the book's chapters arbitrarily; however, he consciously moved the "Hauser and O'Brien" chapter to the end, creating a frame narrative in which William Lee evades "the heat" of the law. Lee's escape from the agents at the end of the book is portrayed as "spiritual and linguistically radical" freedom. Ron Loewinsohn interprets the book's structure as a katabasis. The novel begins with Lee descending into an underground subway, becomes increasingly surreal until Lee reaches the chaotic Hell of Interzone, then ends with Lee emerging back into the world above.

On stools covered in white satin sit naked Mugwumps sucking translucent, colored syrups through alabaster straws. Mugwumps have no liver and nourish themselves exclusively on sweets. Thin, purple-blue lips cover a razor-sharp beak of black bone with which they frequently tear each other to shreds in fights over clients. These creatures secrete an addicting fluid from their erect penises which prolongs life by slowing metabolism.

— Naked Lunch

Burroughs' writing aims to provoke disgust. The novel contains many explicit sexual scenes, emphasizing "sterile, inhuman, malevolent" acts of castration, sodomy, pederasty, and sadomasochism; in particular, the novel features recurring imagery connecting hanging with orgasm. In most cases, the novel portrays sex as exploitative rather than consensual. Many "routines" involve body horror, especially grotesque transformations of humans into insects or amorphous blobs. Many of the novel's grotesque images revolve around consumption: people are described as animals like vampire bats and boa constrictors, trade giant centipede meat, and depend on the secretions of monsters called Mugwumps.

=== Genre ===
Biographer Barry Miles and Burroughs himself have called Naked Lunch a Picaresque novel. Other critics consider the book a parody with elements of spy fiction, detective fiction, science fiction, and horror fiction, or a dystopian science fiction novel in the tradition of Brave New World and Nineteen Eighty-Four. Marshall McLuhan considered the novel an "anti-Utopia" response to Arthur Rimbaud's Illuminations. The novel has been described as postmodern and "proto-postmodern".

The novel is partly autobiographical. The first chapter retells events previously described in Burroughs' semi-autobiographical first novel Junkie. This retelling introduces a new character called "the fruit", who serves as a parody of the implied reader of Junkie; the fruit presents himself as hip and street-smart, but Lee mocks his naivety and plans to sell him catnip by claiming it's cannabis. Other routines are also based on Burroughs' real life, such as Lee's interactions with a racist County Clerk and his addiction to Eukodal. Dr. Benway's dehumanizing Rehabilitation Center parodies the real-life Lexington Medical Center, which once treated Burroughs for opioid addiction. Loewinsohn interprets Interzone and its political power struggles as "a metaphor for Burroughs himself", with the political parties reflecting Burroughs' romantic struggles, his history of self-harm, and his attempts to communicate with his readers.

== Analysis and themes ==
The novel describes Interzone's four political parties: the Liquefactionists want to physically dissolve and absorb other people, the Senders want to control other people's minds via telepathy, and the Divisionists want to endlessly replicate themselves. These parties each represent threats to individualism, and are opposed by the fourth party, the Factualists, to which Lee belongs. The novel is especially critical of the Senders, describing them as "the Human Virus", interested in control solely for its own sake, and the root cause of "poverty, hatred, war, police-criminals, bureaucracy, [and] insanity". The novel showcases the struggle between authoritarian, bureaucratic control, epitomized by Dr. Benway, and individual freedom, represented by the Factualist Party. AJ and Lee, both Factualists, fight back against these systems of control with violence and absurd humor. However, Burroughs undermines these characters' heroism: AJ and Lee work for Islam Inc., which has unclear goals of its own, AJ may be a double agent, and Lee is himself controlled by addiction.

Robin Lydenberg observes that all three non-Factionalist parties represent homogenization and opposition to individual expression. Likewise, Dr. Benway and other scientists attempt to "improve" humanity, but show contempt for the diversity and complexity of human life. The novel describes its characters in behaviorist terms, emphasizing stimuli and responses rather than emotions and internal states. The novel depicts humans as mechanical beings, creating what Edward Foster describes as a "Pavlovian nightmare". In particular, Dr Benway uses behavioral conditioning for evil ends, inverting the utopian ideals described by B. F. Skinner in his book Walden Two. Edward Foster sees the Factualists as representing older libertarian values from the Wild west. In contrast, Benway turns drugs and sex into tools of regulation and control, rather than freedom and liberation. Ron Loewinsohn identifies the political parties as representing different methods of international control: Liquefactionists as fascism, Divisionists as colonialism, and Senders as the soft power and cultural influence of the United States. He notes that the Factualists, who infiltrate and undermine the other parties, mirror Burroughs' understanding of how apomorphine works to relieve opioid addiction. He also notes that this undercover infiltration often leads to the Factualists acting similarly to their opposition, such as AJ and Hassan both staging sadomasochistic parties, but with crucial differences: Hassan's cruelty is real, while AJ's is simulated. Meanwhile, Freeland, the novel's stand-in for Scandinavia, is described as a "police state without police"; its citizens have become so neurotic that they obsessively monitor themselves.

Interzone is also marked by a violent struggle between Nationalists and Imperialists, reflecting the political situation Burroughs observed in Tangiers. The novel does not align itself with either side. One of the book's most political routines mocks the Nationalist Party Leader, describing him as a "gangster in drag" who cares only about his own position, not the residents of Interzone. However, the Capitalists who oppose him are equally unconcerned with Interzone's residents, whom they see as merely targets to exploit. This skepticism of both sides reflects Burroughs' own ambivalence towards Moroccan nationalism. Within Interzone, the racial and national hierarchies of colonialism are superseded by unrestricted capitalism. Hassan, who owns multiple passports and is racially ambiguous, hosts a "rumpus room" in which bodies and sex are commodities and white boys are sexually dominated by boys of other races.

The novel's routines emphasize addiction, especially to heroin, which can be read as a metaphor for broader social problems and obsessions. David Ayers interprets heroin as Burroughs' "paradigm" for understanding systems of control. However, Frank McConnell argues that Naked Lunch is straightforwardly about heroin addiction in itself, and should not be read as symbolic. Lydenberg argues that Burroughs' parenthetical asides challenge the reader's instinct to "evade" the darkness of the book by treating its disturbing elements as symbols or allegories, and instead show that Burroughs insists on a literal reading. Frederick Whiting emphasizes that the novel's drug motif should be seen as a metonym for social and economic issues, not a metaphor.

The novel has been described as "an essentially nihilistic work" and "consistently hostile, contemptuous, forcefully hateful [...] without joy." Robin Lydenberg suggests that the novel advocates "a violent rejection and undermining of the entire dual system of morality."

Barry Miles interprets the recurring hanging scenes as critiquing sexual exploitation, racist lynchings, and capital punishment in general. Burroughs himself considered his novel a Swiftian argument against the death penalty.

=== The man who taught his asshole to talk ===
One of the novel's most famous routines describes "the man who taught his asshole to talk". Armed with the power of speech, the anus takes over the man's body and brain. Tony Tanner sees this routine as a paradigm for Burroughs' general theme of humans decaying into lower forms of life. Wayne Pounds reads it as a parody of behaviorist engineering and the pursuit of efficiency. Robin Lydenberg reads it as challenging the notion that language differentiate humans from animals. Loewinsohn sees it representing zero-sum domination, contrasted against another anus-centered story shortly afterward which represents positive-sum cooperation. Manuel Luis Martínez considers it a political allegory for Burroughs' libertarian beliefs. The anus claims to want equal rights before taking over the body, and the routine is juxtaposed with Dr. Benway calling democracy a cancer, suggesting that egalitarianism can become authoritarian. Burroughs himself considered the scene a metaphor for ever-expanding bureaucracy.

Jamie Russell interprets the routine as expressing Burroughs' view of homosexuality. Burroughs believed that men were coerced into a binary of either heterosexuality or effeminacy, as the "sissy" archetype was the only role society recognized for gay men. He considered this feminine mimicry self-destructive, not empowering or subversive, and believed it created a marginalized identity akin to schizophrenia. Russell observes that the anus is originally used for a ventriloquy routine. This mirrors a description in Burroughs' first novel Junkie, in which effeminate gay men are derided as "ventriloquists’ dummies who have moved in and taken over the ventriloquist".

Barry Miles interprets the anus as Burroughs himself, reflecting his anxieties and frustrations after being romantically rejected by Allen Ginsberg. He interprets the routine as Burroughs empowering himself in the relationship dynamic.

== Literary significance and reception ==
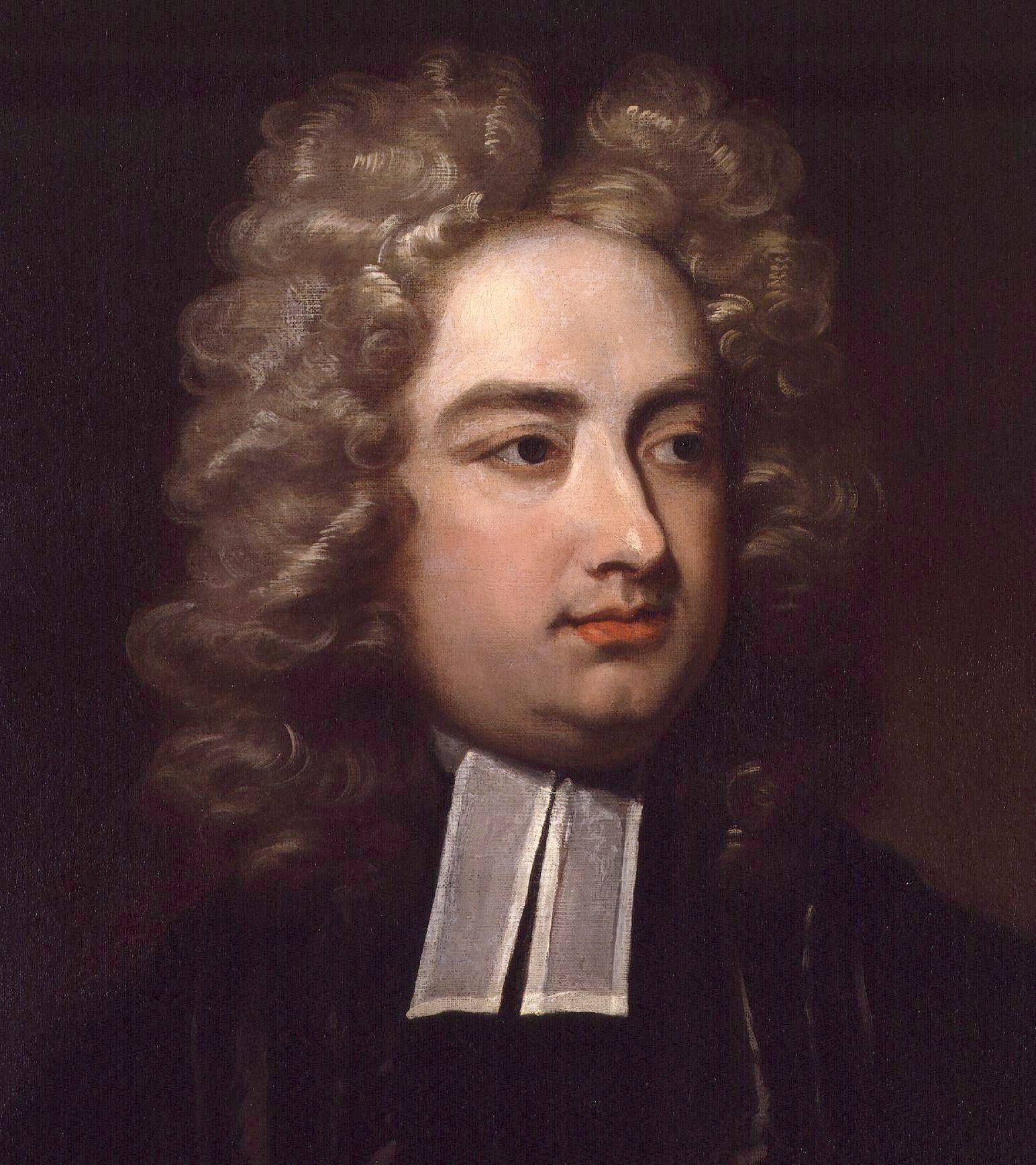
Critics have compared Naked Lunch to the works of Jonathan Swift, who wrote political satires such as Gulliver's Travels and A Modest Proposal.

Along with Howl and On The Road, Naked Lunch is considered one of the defining works of the Beat generation.

Mary McCarthy was an early proponent of the novel. She wrote that Burroughs was one of only two authors who had recently interested her (along with Nabokov), defended his crudeness by placing him in the satirical tradition of Jonathan Swift, and praised his "broad and sly" humor by comparing it to vaudeville. John Ciardi, defending the book against charges of obscenity, praised it as "a masterpiece of its own genre" and "a monumentally moral descent into the hell of a narcotic addiction." Norman Mailer praised Burroughs' "exquisite poetic sense" and considered Naked Lunch a powerful religious work, describing it as "a vision of how mankind would act if man was totally divorced from eternity" and akin to the work of Hieronymus Bosch. J. G. Ballard considered the novel (along with The Soft Machine and The Ticket That Exploded) to be "the first authentic mythology of the age of Cape Canaveral, Hiroshima and Belsen" and favorably compared Burroughs' work to Finnegans Wake and The Metamorphosis. Richard Kostelanetz, while admitting the novel was "wildly uneven" and "among the most horrifying and terrible books ever written", praised its intensity and imagination, calling it by far the greatest novel of the Beat movement and "perhaps among the greatest literary works of our time".

In contrast, John Wain called it "a prolonged scream of hatred and disgust" and "the merest trash, not worth a second glance". Lionel Abel compared the work to a film that spliced together pornography with footage of Nazi concentration camps, writing "Now it is foolish, I think, to justify Naked Lunch as literature. Its descriptions of hallucinatory states under drug addiction are neither beautiful nor exquisite nor brilliant nor informative. I even wonder whether they are true." David Lodge admitted that Burroughs had "a certain literary talent", but felt that the novel's initial excitement quickly became boring, confused, and unsatisfying. He considered comparisons between Burroughs and Swift "either naive or disingenuous". In an anonymous review, Time magazine panned the book as "the grotesque diary of Burroughs’ years as an addict." (Note: ^α Burroughs retaliated three years later by using a collage with that issue's cover of Time magazine as the cover of his cut-up pamphlet, Time.) John Willett wrote an anonymous review in The Times Literary Supplement simply titled Ugh..., in which he called the book disgusting and monotonous and wrote "If the publishers had deliberately set out to discredit the cause of literary freedom and innovation they could hardly have done it more effectively." This led to the longest set of responses the Literary Supplement had ever received.

Charles Poole, reviewing the book for The New York Times, criticized its "glaringly gaudy" approach of "using shocking words by the shovelful and concentrating on perverted degeneracy to a flagrant degree." A review in Commentary described Burroughs' novel as a more readable version of the work of Alain Robbe-Grillet, but felt that Burroughs' writing fell short of works by Henry Miller, George Orwell, and the Marquis de Sade, and that the novel ultimately resembled a child's tantrum.

Fans of Beat Generation literature, Donald Fagen and Walter Becker named their band Steely Dan after a "revolutionary" steam-powered dildo mentioned in the novel. Lou Reed also identified the book as a major artistic influence.

Naked Lunch is considered a key influence on the cyberpunk genre. William Gibson has cited it as one of the novels that most influenced his own writing.

The novel was included in Time 's "100 Best English-language Novels from 1923 to 2005".

== Adaptations ==
=== Film ===
From the 1960s, numerous film-makers considered adapting Naked Lunch for the screen. Antony Balch, who worked with Burroughs on a number of short film projects in 1960s, considered making a musical with Mick Jagger in the lead role, but the project fell through when relationships soured between Balch and Jagger. Burroughs himself adapted his book for the never-made film; after Jagger dropped out, Dennis Hopper was considered for the lead role, and at one point game-show producer Chuck Barris was considered a possible financier of the project.

In May 1991, rather than attempting a straight adaptation, Canadian director David Cronenberg took a few elements from the book and combined them with elements of Burroughs' life, creating a hybrid film about the writing of the book rather than the book itself. Peter Weller starred as William Lee, the pseudonym Burroughs used when he wrote Junkie.

=== Comic Books ===
Italian comics artist Gianluca Lerici, better known under his artistic pseudonym Professor Bad Trip, adapted the novel into a graphic novel titled Il Pasto Nudo (1992), published by Shake Edizioni.
