= Melitzah =

Melitzah (Hebrew: מְלִיצָה) is a medieval Hebrew literary device in which a mosaic of fragments and phrases from the Hebrew Bible as well as from rabbinic literature or the liturgy is fitted together to form a new statement of what the author intends to express at the moment. It is similar to cento.

In Hebrew the word melitzah means satire, mocking, taunting, enigma or witticism. In Freud's Moses (1991), Yosef Yerushalami wrote: "Melitzah, in effect, recalls Walter Benjamin's desire to someday write a work composed entirely of quotations. At any rate, it was a literary device employed widely in medieval Hebrew poetry and prose, then through the movement known as Haskalah, Hebrew for “enlightenment,” and even among nineteenth-century writers both modern and traditional" (p. 71).

Yerushalami argues: "In melitzah the sentences compounded out of quotations mean what they say; but below and beyond the surface they reverberate with associations to the original texts, and this is what makes them psychologically so interesting and valuable. In the transposition of a quotation from the original (in this case canonical) text to a new one, the meaning of the original context may be retained, altered, or subverted. In any case the original context trails along as an invisible interlinear presence, and the readers, like the writer, must be aware of these associations if they are to savor the new text to the full. A partial analogy may be found in T. S. Eliot's use of quotations in The Waste Land" (ibid., p. 72).

When melitzah is used successfully, it arouses in the reader a particular set of images and associations that add texture and tone to what is being described, much as a chordal accompaniment does to a melodic line.

== See also ==
Cut-up technique

== Bibliography ==
Spence, D.P. Narrative Truth and Historical Truth: Meaning and Interpretation in Psychoanalysis (New York, W.W. Norton: 1982).

Yerushalmi, Y.H. Freud's Moses: Judaism Terminable and Interminable (New Haven, Yale University Press: 1991).
