= Saddle stitch stapler =

Bookbinding tool

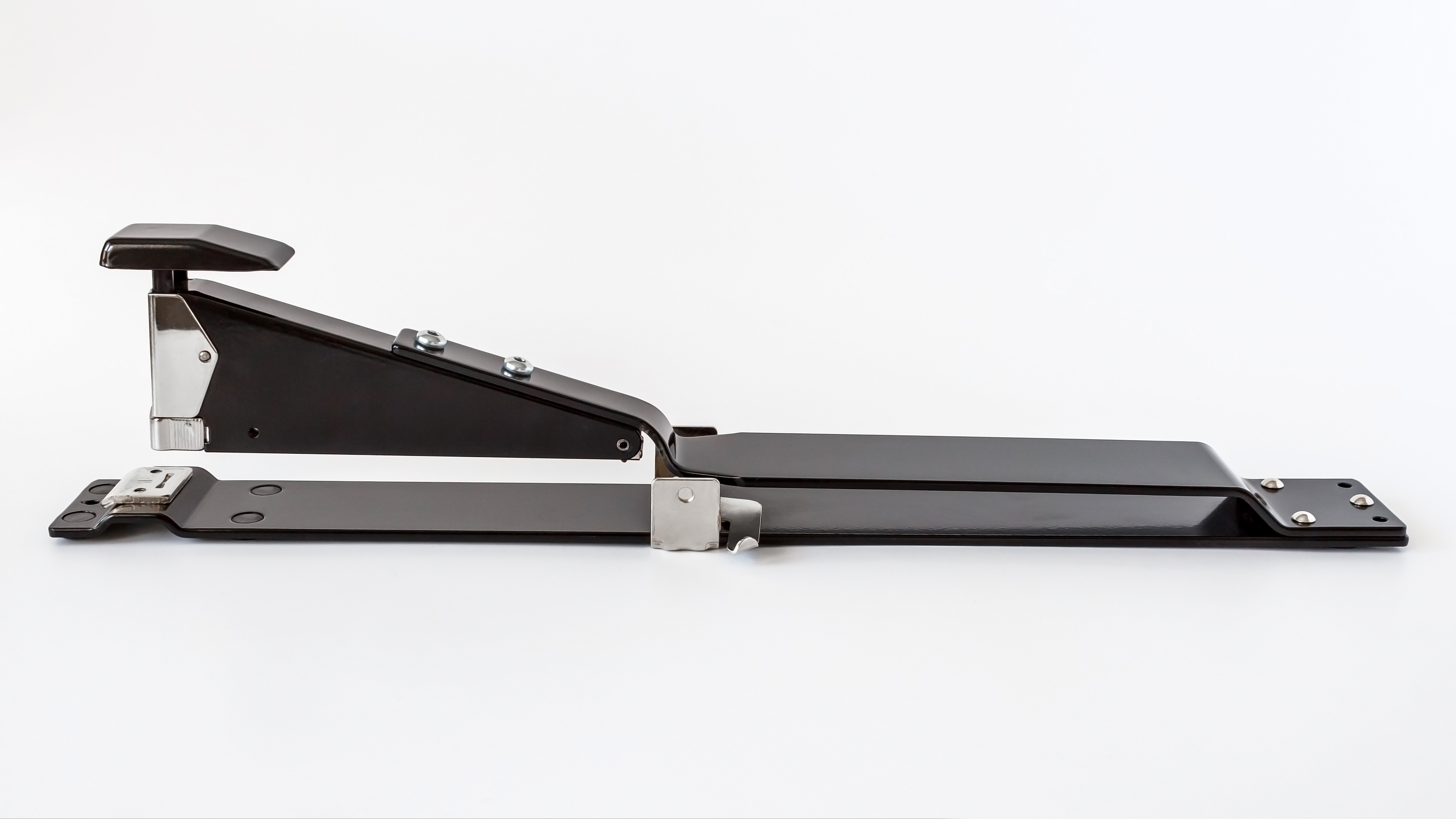
A manual saddle stapler

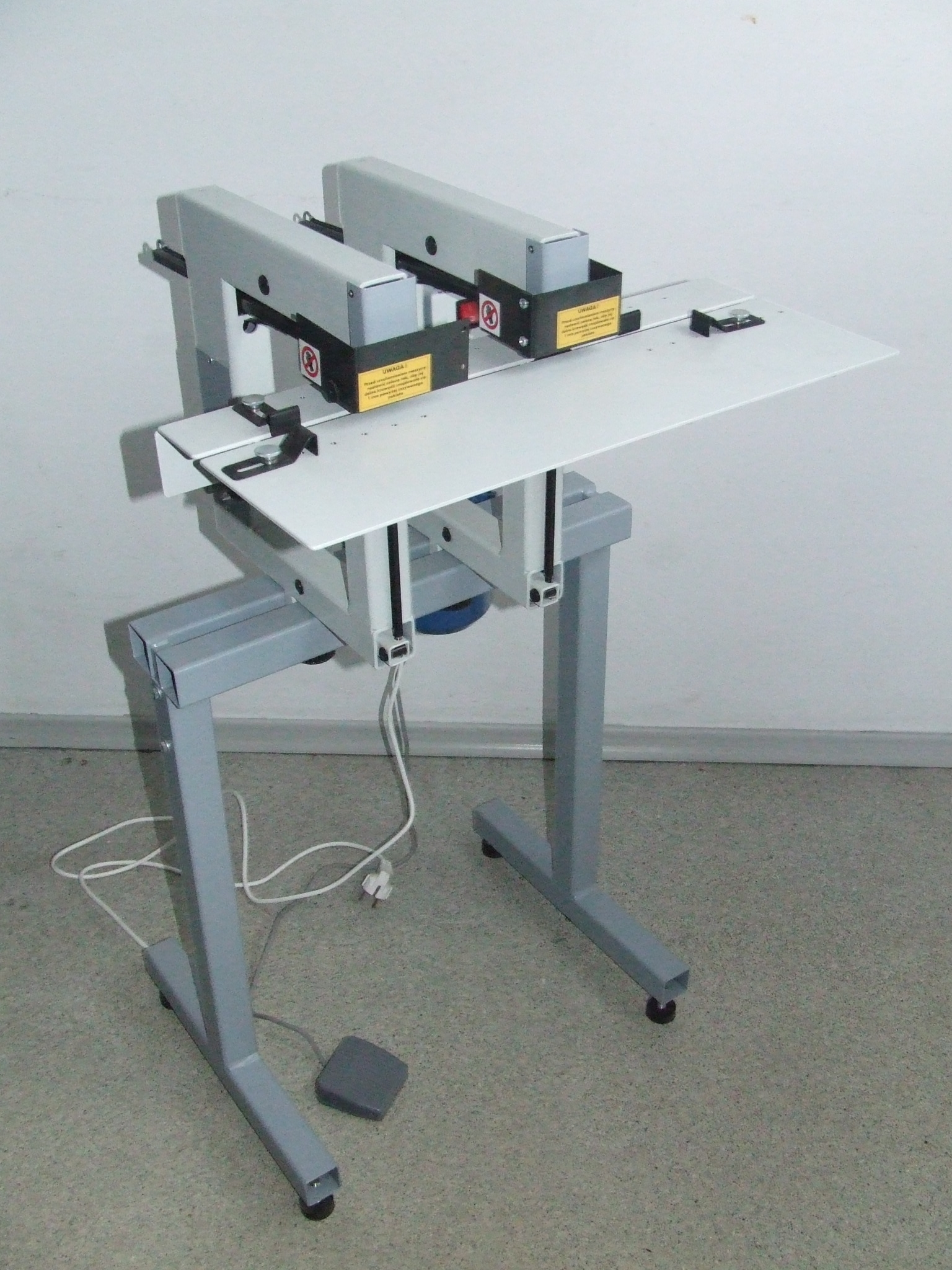
An electric saddle stapler

Saddle stitch staplers or simply saddle staplers are bookbinding tools designed to insert staples into the spine (saddle) of folded printed matter such as booklets, catalogues, brochures, and manuals. They are distinguished by the presence of a metal V-shaped hump or "saddle" which is used to precisely align the central fold of the material to be stapled. Manual saddle staplers are generally longer than most traditional staplers, which are too short to staple booklets easily.

A saddle stapler may also be used to staple fabric or other flexible material, as the material is bunched up inside the throat in order to reach the seam to be stapled. Most high-end photocopiers and digital production printers on the market have optional attached saddle stitch units that fold and staple booklets automatically.

== Design and components ==
A saddle stitch stapler is built to align and fasten sheets at the fold rather than near an edge, distinguishing it from most office staplers. A metal V-shaped anvil (the “saddle”) supports the folded work so the staple legs penetrate on either side of the crease and are clinched centrally. Units typically provide a long throat or open frame to accommodate common booklet formats and allow alignment to the fold, together with adjustments for throat depth and head position where multiple stitches are required.

Stapling heads and clinchers

Most machines use a stapling head that forms and drives the wire through the paper into an opposing clincher, which bends the legs inward to secure the booklet. Some models accept pre-formed staples, while industrial heads may draw and cut from wire stock for continuous operation.

Drive types

Saddle units are available as manual bench tools, foot-operated or pneumatic machines, and electric/servo-driven models. In print shops, the stapling head is often integrated with folding as a combined “fold-and-stitch” module attached to high-end copiers or digital presses.

Fasteners

Common choices include galvanized or stainless steel staples in varying crown widths and leg lengths selected for paper thickness. Corrosion-resistant wire is preferred for long-term storage or higher-humidity environments.

Safety features

Industrial machines may incorporate guards, interlocks, or two-hand controls to reduce the risk of injury during operation.
