= Brion Gysin =

British-Canadian painter, writer, sound poet, and performance artist (1916–1986)

- Born: John Clifford Brian Gysin; 19 January 1916; Taplow, Buckinghamshire, England
- Died: 13 July 1986 (aged 70); Paris, France
- Education: Sorbonne, Downside School
- Occupations: Painter; writer; poet
- Writing career
- Movements: Beat, Postmodern, Asemic writing

Brion Gysin (/ˈɡaɪzən/; 19 January 1916 – 13 July 1986) was a British-Canadian painter, writer, sound poet, performance artist and inventor of experimental devices.

He is best known for his use of the cut-up technique, alongside his close friend, the novelist William S. Burroughs. With the engineer Ian Sommerville he also invented the Dreamachine, a flicker device designed as an art object to be viewed with the eyes closed. It was in painting and drawing, however, that Gysin devoted his greatest efforts, creating calligraphic works inspired by cursive Japanese "grass" script and Arabic script. Burroughs later stated that "Brion Gysin was the only man I ever respected."

== Biography ==
=== Early years ===
John Clifford Brian Gysin was born at the Canadian military hospital in Taplow, Buckinghamshire, England. His mother, Stella Margaret Martin, was a Canadian from Deseronto, Ontario. His father, Leonard Gysin, a captain with the Canadian Expeditionary Force, was killed in action eight months after his son's birth. Stella returned to Canada and settled in Edmonton, Alberta where her son became "the only Catholic day-boy at an Anglican boarding school". Leaving that school at the age of fifteen, Gysin was sent next to Downside School in Stratton-on-the-Fosse, near Bath in England, a prestigious school for boys run by Benedictine monks. Despite attending both Anglican and Roman Catholic schools, Gysin was already an atheist when he left St Joseph's.

=== Surrealism ===
In 1934, he moved to Paris to study La Civilisation Française, an open course given at the Sorbonne where he made literary and artistic contacts through Marie Berthe Aurenche, Max Ernst's second wife. He joined the Surrealist Group and began associating with Valentine Hugo, Leonor Fini, Salvador Dalí, Picasso and Dora Maar. A year later, he had his first exhibition at the Galérie Quatre Chemins in Paris with Ernst, Picasso, Hans Arp, Hans Bellmer, Victor Brauner, Giorgio de Chirico, Dalí, Marcel Duchamp, René Magritte, Man Ray and Yves Tanguy. On the day of the preview, however, he was expelled from the Surrealist Group by André Breton, who ordered the poet Paul Éluard to take down his pictures. Gysin was 19 years old. His biographer, John Geiger, suggests the arbitrary expulsion "had the effect of a curse. Years later, he blamed other failures on the Breton incident. It gave rise to conspiracy theories about the powerful interests who seek control of the art world. He gave various explanations for the expulsion, the more elaborate involving 'insubordination' or lèse majesté towards Breton".

=== After World War II ===
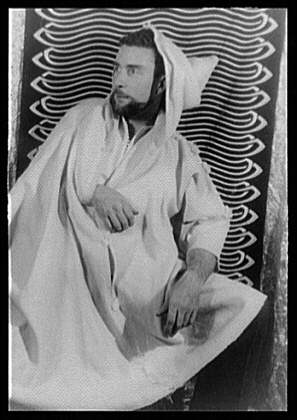
Gysin in 1957

After serving in the U.S. Army during World War II, Gysin published a biography of Josiah "Uncle Tom" Henson titled, To Master, a Long Goodnight: The History of Slavery in Canada (1946). A gifted draughtsman, he took an 18-month course learning the Japanese language (including calligraphy) that would greatly influence his artwork. In 1949, he was among the first Fulbright Fellows. His goal was to research, at the University of Bordeaux and in the Archivo de Indias in Seville, Spain, the history of slavery, a project that he later abandoned. He moved to Tangier, Morocco, after visiting the city with novelist and composer Paul Bowles in 1950. In 1952/3 he met the travel writer and sexual adventurer Anne Cumming and they remained friends until his death.

=== Morocco and the Beat Hotel ===
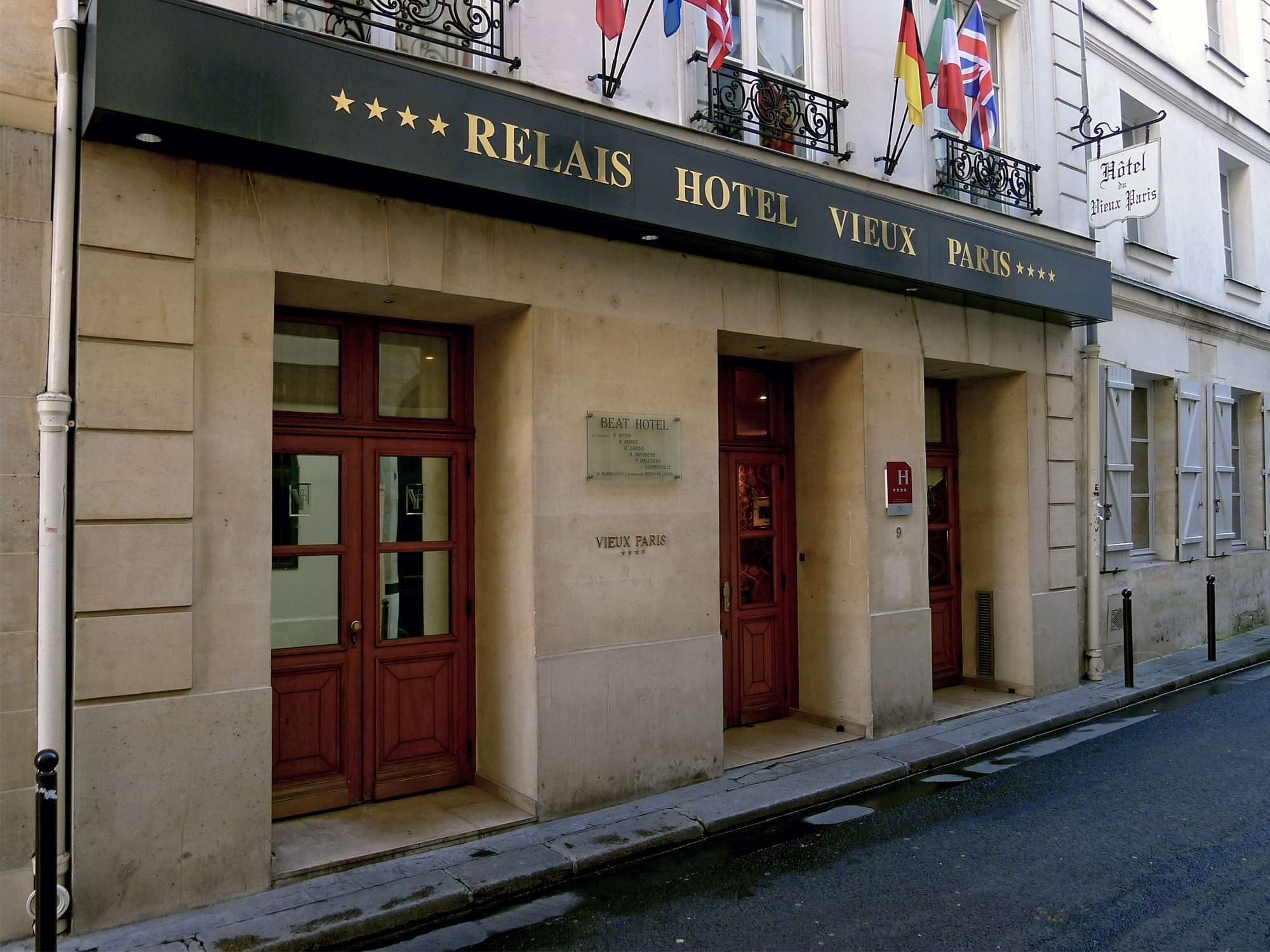
Rue Gît-le-Cœur, Paris; site of Beat Hotel

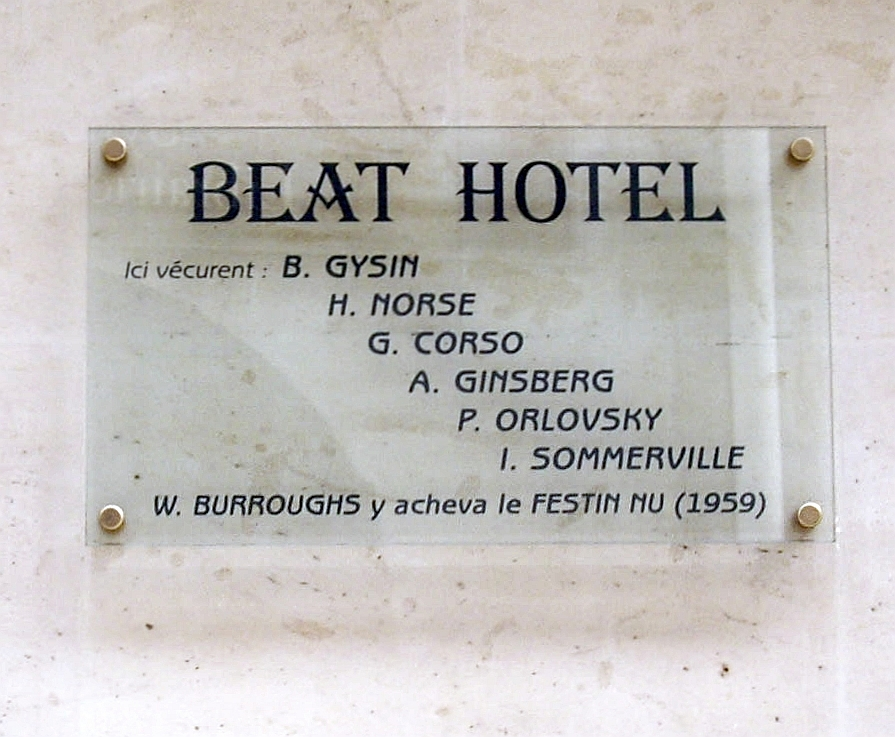
Plaque commemorating site of Beat Hotel

In 1954 in Tangier, Gysin opened a restaurant called The 1001 Nights, with his friend Mohamed Hamri, who was the cook. Gysin hired the Master Musicians of Jajouka from the village of Jajouka to perform alongside entertainment that included acrobats, a dancing boy and fire eaters. The musicians performed there for an international clientele that included William S. Burroughs. Gysin lost the business in 1958, and the restaurant closed permanently. That same year, Gysin returned to Paris, taking lodgings in a flophouse located at 9 rue Gît-le-Cœur that would become famous as the Beat Hotel. Working on a drawing, he discovered a Dada technique by accident:

William Burroughs and I first went into techniques of writing, together, back in room No. 15 of the Beat Hotel during the cold Paris spring of 1958... Burroughs was more intent on Scotch-taping his photos together into one great continuum on the wall, where scenes faded and slipped into one another, than occupied with editing the monster manuscript... Naked Lunch appeared and Burroughs disappeared. He kicked his habit with Apomorphine and flew off to London to see Dr Dent, who had first turned him on to the cure. While cutting a mount for a drawing in room No. 15, I sliced through a pile of newspapers with my Stanley blade and thought of what I had said to Burroughs some six months earlier about the necessity for turning painters' techniques directly into writing. I picked up the raw words and began to piece together texts that later appeared as "First Cut-Ups" in Minutes to Go (Two Cities, Paris 1960).

When Burroughs returned from London in September 1959, Gysin not only shared his discovery with his friend but the new techniques he had developed for it. Burroughs then put the techniques to use while completing Naked Lunch and the experiment dramatically changed the landscape of American literature. Gysin helped Burroughs with the editing of several of his novels including Interzone, and wrote a script for a film version of Naked Lunch, which was never produced. The pair collaborated on a large manuscript for Grove Press titled The Third Mind, but it was determined that it would be impractical to publish it as originally envisioned. The book later published under that title incorporates little of this material. Interviewed for The Guardian in 1997, Burroughs explained that Gysin was "the only man that I've ever respected in my life. I've admired people, I've liked them, but he's the only man I've ever respected." In 1969, Gysin completed his finest novel, The Process, a work judged by critic Robert Palmer as "a classic of 20th century modernism".

A consummate innovator, Gysin altered the cut-up technique to produce what he called permutation poems in which a single phrase was repeated several times with the words rearranged in a different order with each reiteration. An example of this is "I don't dig work, man / Man, work I don't dig." Many of these permutations were derived using a random sequence generator in an early computer program written by Ian Sommerville. Commissioned by the BBC in 1960 to produce material for broadcast, Gysin's results included "Pistol Poem", which was created by recording a gun firing at different distances and then splicing the sounds. That year, the piece was subsequently used as a theme for the Paris performance of Le Domaine Poetique, a showcase for experimental works by people like Gysin, François Dufrêne, Bernard Heidsieck, and Henri Chopin.

With Sommerville, he built the Dreamachine in 1961. Described as "the first art object to be seen with the eyes closed", the flicker device uses alpha waves in the 8–16 Hz range to produce a change of consciousness in receptive viewers.

=== Later years ===
In April 1974, while sitting at a social engagement, Gysin had a very noticeable rectal bleeding. In May he wrote to Burroughs complaining he was not feeling well. A short time later he was diagnosed with colon cancer and began to receive cobalt treatment. Between December 1974 and April 1975, Gysin had to undergo several surgeries, among them a very traumatic colostomy, that drove him to extreme depression and to a suicide attempt. Later, in Fire: Words by Day – Images by Night (1975), a crudely lucid text, he would describe the horrendous ordeal he went through.

In 1985 Gysin was made an American Commander of the French Ordre des Arts et des Lettres. He'd begun to work extensively with noted jazz soprano saxophonist Steve Lacy. They recorded an album in 1986 with French musician Ramuntcho Matta, featuring Gysin singing/rapping his own texts, with performances by Lacy, Don Cherry, Elli Medeiros, Lizzy Mercier Descloux and more. The album was reissued on CD in 1993 by Crammed Discs, under the title Self-Portrait Jumping.

== Death ==
On 13 July 1986 Brion Gysin died of lung cancer. Anne Cumming arranged his funeral and for his ashes to be scattered at the Caves of Hercules in Morocco. An obituary by Robert Palmer published in The New York Times described him as a man who "threw off the sort of ideas that ordinary artists would parlay into a lifetime career, great clumps of ideas, as casually as a locomotive throws off sparks". Later that year a heavily edited version of his novel, The Last Museum, was published posthumously by Faber & Faber (London) and by Grove Press (New York).

As a joke, Gysin had contributed a recipe for marijuana fudge to a cookbook by Alice B. Toklas; it was included for publication, becoming famous under the name Alice B. Toklas brownies.

== Burroughs on the Gysin cut-up ==
In a 1966 interview by Conrad Knickerbocker for The Paris Review, William S. Burroughs explained that Brion Gysin was, to his knowledge, "the first to create cut-ups":

A friend, Brion Gysin, an American poet and painter, who has lived in Europe for thirty years, was, as far as I know, the first to create cut-ups. His cut-up poem, Minutes to Go, was broadcast by the BBC and later published in a pamphlet. I was in Paris in the summer of 1960; this was after the publication there of Naked Lunch. I became interested in the possibilities of this technique, and I began experimenting myself. Of course, when you think of it, The Waste Land was the first great cut-up collage, and Tristan Tzara had done a bit along the same lines. Dos Passos used the same idea in 'The Camera Eye' sequences in USA. I felt I had been working toward the same goal; thus it was a major revelation to me when I actually saw it being done.

== Influence ==
According to José Férez Kuri, author of Brion Gysin: Tuning in to the Multimedia Age (2003) and co-curator of a major retrospective of the artist's work at The Edmonton Art Gallery in 1998, Gysin's wide range of "radical ideas would become a source of inspiration for artists of the Beat Generation, as well as for their successors (among them David Bowie, Mick Jagger, Keith Haring, and Laurie Anderson)". Other artists include Genesis P-Orridge, John Zorn (as displayed on the 2013's Dreamachines album) and Brian Jones.

== Selected bibliography ==
Gysin is the subject of John Geiger's biography, Nothing Is True Everything Is Permitted: The Life of Brion Gysin, and features in Chapel of Extreme Experience: A Short History of Stroboscopic Light and the Dream Machine, also by Geiger. Man From Nowhere: Storming the Citadels of Enlightenment with William Burroughs and Brion Gysin, a biographical study of Burroughs and Gysin with a collection of homages to Gysin, was authored by Joe Ambrose, Frank Rynne, and Terry Wilson with contributions by Marianne Faithfull, John Cale, William S. Burroughs, John Giorno, Stanley Booth, Bill Laswell, Mohamed Hamri, Keith Haring and Paul Bowles. A monograph on Gysin was published in 2003 by Thames and Hudson.

=== Works ===
==== Prose ====
- To Master, A Long Goodnight: The History of Slavery in Canada (1946)
- Minutes to Go (1960)
- The Exterminator (1960)
- The Process (1969)
- Brion Gysin Let The Mice In (1973)
- The Third Mind (1978), with William S. Burroughs
- Here To Go: Planet R-101 (first published 1982)
- Stories (1984)
- The Last Museum (1985)
- Living with Islam (2010)
- His Name Was Master (Interviews) (2018)

==== Radio ====
- Pistol Poem (1960)
- Permutations (1960)
- I Am (1960)
- No Poets (1962)
- Junk is No Good Baby (1962)

==== Cinema ====
- Scenario to Naked Lunch (1973)

==== Music ====
- Songs (hat ART, 181) with Steve Lacy
- Junk (1985)
- Self-Portrait Jumping (with Ramuntcho Matta, Don Cherry, Steve Lacy) (1993)

==== Painting ====
- Les deux faux interlocuteurs, Gradiva Rediviva Zoe Bertgang, and Signe dans le paysage (Surrealist ink drawings, 1935)
- Sahara Sand (1958)
- The Songs of Marrakech (1959)
- Unit II pink, Unit III yellow, Unit IV orange, Unit V blue (1961)
- Francis in the Beat Hotel (1962)
- For a Stained-Glass Window in Rheims (1963)
- Roller Poem (1971)
- Calligraffiti of Fire (1986)

==== Illustration ====
- Time

== Sources ==
=== Print ===
==== Primary sources ====
- Gysin, Brion (1946). To Master, A Long Goodnight: The History of Slavery in Canada. New York: Creative Age Press.
- Gysin, Brion; Beiles, Sinclair; Burroughs, William S.; Corso, Gregory (1960). Minutes to Go. Paris: Two Cities Editions.
- Gysin, Brion; Burroughs, William S. (1960). The Exterminator. San Francisco: Auerhahn Press.
- Gysin, Brion (1969). The Process. New York: Doubleday.
- Gysin, Brion; Burroughs, William S.; Sommerville, Ian (1973). Jan Herman (ed.). Brion Gysin Let The Mice In'. West Glover, VT: Something Else Press.
- Gysin, Brion; Burroughs, William S. (1978). The Third Mind. New York: Viking.
- Gysin, Brion (1982). Here To Go: Planet R-101 (Interviews with Terry Wilson). London: Quartet Books.
- Gysin, Brion (1984). Stories. Oakland: Inkblot Publications.
- Gysin, Brion (1986). The Last Museum. New York: Grove Press.
- Gysin, Brion (2000). Who Runs May Read. Oakland/Brisbane: Inkblot/Xochi.
- Gysin, Brion (2001). Jason Weiss (ed.). Back in No Time: The Brion Gysin Reader. Wesleyan University Press.
- Gysin, Brion (2010). Living With Islam. Providence: Inkblot.
- Gysin, Brion (2018). His Name Was Master (Interviews with Genesis P.Orridge). Stockholm: Trapart Books.

==== Secondary sources ====
- Morgan, Ted. Literary Outlaw: The Life and Times of William S. Burroughs. New York and London: W.W. Norton & Company, 1988, 2012. ISBN 978-0393342604
- Kuri, José Férez, ed. Brion Gysin: Tuning in to the Multimedia Age. London: Thames & Hudson, 2003. ISBN 0-500-28438-5
- Geiger, John. Nothing Is True Everything Is Permitted: The Life of Brion Gysin. Disinformation Company, 2005. ISBN 1-932857-12-5
- Geiger, John. Chapel of Extreme Experience: A Short History of Stroboscopic Light and the Dream Machine. Soft Skull Press, 2003.
- Ambrose, Joe, Frank Rynne, and Terry Wilson. Man From Nowhere: Storming the Citadels of Enlightenment with William Burroughs and Brion Gysin. Williamsburg: Autonomedia, 1992
- Vale, V. William Burroughs, Brion Gysin, Throbbing Gristle. San Francisco: V/Search, 1982. ISBN 0-9650469-1-5

== See also ==
- Asemic writing
- Brian Jones Presents the Pipes of Pan at Joujouka
