= Cut-up technique =

Literary technique of rearranging text

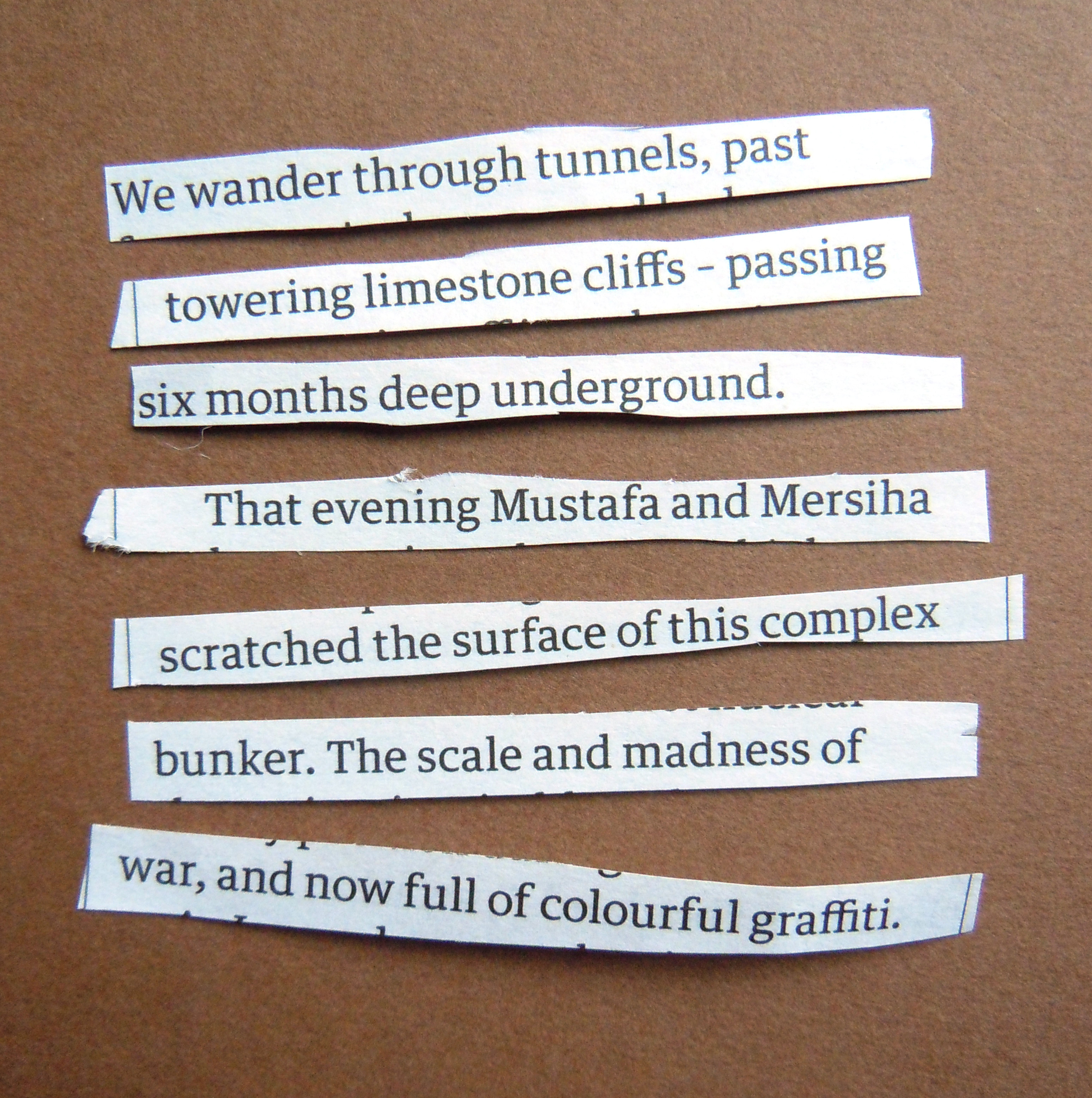
A text created from lines of a newspaper tourism article

The cut-up technique (or découpé in French) is an aleatory narrative technique in which a written text is cut up and rearranged to create a new text. The concept can be traced to the Dadaists of the 1920s, but it was developed and popularized in the 1950s and early 1960s, especially by writer William S. Burroughs. It has since been used in a wide variety of contexts.

== Technique ==
The cut-up and the closely associated fold-in are the two main techniques:

- Cut-up is performed by taking a finished and fully linear text and cutting it in pieces with a few or single words on each piece. The resulting pieces are then rearranged into a new text, such as in poems by Tristan Tzara as described in his short text, TO MAKE A DADAIST POEM.
- Fold-in is the technique of taking two sheets of linear text (with the same linespacing), folding each sheet in half vertically and combining with the other, then reading across the resulting page, such as in The Third Mind. It is a joint development between Burroughs and Brion Gysin.

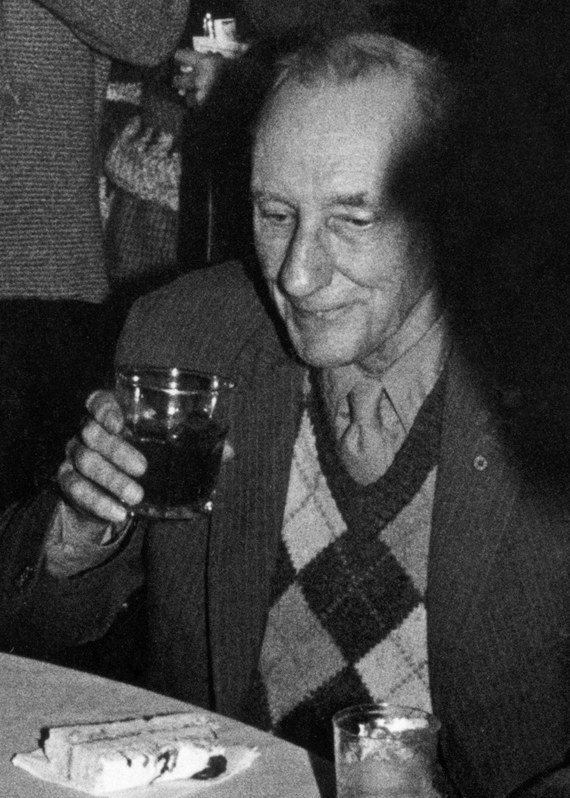
William S. Burroughs, popularizer of the technique

William Burroughs cited T. S. Eliot's 1922 poem, The Waste Land, and John Dos Passos' U.S.A. trilogy, which incorporated newspaper clippings, as early examples of the cut ups he popularized.

Gysin introduced Burroughs to the technique at the Beat Hotel. The pair later applied the technique to printed media and audio recordings in an effort to decode the material's implicit content, hypothesizing that such a technique could be used to discover the true meaning of a given text. Burroughs also suggested cut-ups may be effective as a form of divination saying, "When you cut into the present the future leaks out." Burroughs also further developed the "fold-in" technique. In 1977, Burroughs and Gysin published The Third Mind, a collection of cut-up writings and essays on the form. Jeff Nuttall's publication My Own Mag was another important outlet for the then-radical technique.

In an interview, Alan Burns noted that for Europe After The Rain (1965) and subsequent novels he used a version of cut-ups: "I did not actually use scissors, but I folded pages, read across columns, and so on, discovering for myself many of the techniques Burroughs and Gysin describe."

== History ==
=== In literature ===
A precedent of the technique occurred during a Dadaist rally in the 1920s in which Tristan Tzara offered to create a poem on the spot by pulling words at random from a hat. Collage, which was popularized roughly contemporaneously with the Surrealist movement, sometimes incorporated texts such as newspapers or brochures. Prior to this event, the technique had been published in an issue of 391 in the poem by Tzara, dada manifesto on feeble love and bitter love under the sub-title, TO MAKE A DADAIST POEM.

In the 1950s, painter and writer Brion Gysin more fully developed the cut-up method after accidentally rediscovering it. He had placed layers of newspapers as a mat to protect a tabletop from being scratched while he cut papers with a razor blade. Upon cutting through the newspapers, Gysin noticed that the sliced layers offered interesting juxtapositions of text and image. He began deliberately cutting newspaper articles into sections, which he randomly rearranged. The book Minutes to Go resulted from his initial cut-up experiment: unedited and unchanged cut-ups which emerged as coherent and meaningful prose. South African poet Sinclair Beiles also used this technique and co-authored Minutes To Go.

Argentine writer Julio Cortázar used cut ups in his 1963 novel Hopscotch. In 1965, Burroughs used cut ups in his pamphlet Time, which included drawings by Gysin.

In 1969, poets Howard W. Bergerson and J. A. Lindon developed a cut-up technique known as vocabularyclept poetry, in which a poem is formed by taking all the words of an existing poem and rearranging them, often preserving the metre and stanza lengths.

A drama scripted for five voices by performance poet Hedwig Gorski in 1977 originated the idea of creating poetry only for performance instead of for print publication. The "neo-verse drama" titled Booby, Mama! written for "guerilla theater" performances in public places used a combination of newspaper cut-ups that were edited and choreographed for a troupe of non-professional street actors.

Kathy Acker used cut-ups in some of her works, including the novel Blood and Guts in High School.

=== In film ===
Antony Balch and Burroughs created a collaboration film, The Cut-Ups that opened in London in 1967. This was part of an abandoned project called Guerrilla Conditions meant as a documentary on Burroughs and filmed throughout 1961–1965. Inspired by Burroughs' and Gysin's technique of cutting up text and rearranging it in random order, Balch had an editor cut his footage for the documentary into little pieces and impose no control over its reassembly. The film opened at Oxford Street's Cinephone cinema and had a disturbing reaction. Many audience members claimed the film made them ill, others demanded their money back, while some just stumbled out of the cinema ranting "it's disgusting". Other cut-up films include Ghost at n°9 (Paris) (1963–1972), a posthumously released short film compiled from reels found at Balch's office after his death, and William Buys a Parrott (1982), Bill and Tony (1972), Towers Open Fire (1963) and The Junky's Christmas (1966).

=== In music ===
In 1962, the satirical comedy group Bonzo Dog Doo-Dah Band, got their name after using the cut-up technique, resulting in "Bonzo Dog Dada": "Bonzo Dog", after the cartoon Bonzo the Dog, and "Dada" after the Dada avant-garde art movement. The group's eventual frontman, Vivian Stanshall, would quote about wanting to form a band with that name. The "Dada" in the phrase was eventually changed to "Doo-Dah".

Thom Yorke applied a similar method in Radiohead's Kid A (2000) album, writing single lines, putting them into a hat, and drawing them out at random while the band rehearsed the songs. Perhaps indicative of Thom Yorke's influences, instructions for "How to make a Dada poem" appeared on Radiohead's website at this time.

From the early 1970s, David Bowie had used cut-ups to create some of his lyrics. In 1995, he worked with Ty Roberts to develop a program called Verbasizer for his Apple PowerBook that could automatically rearrange multiple sentences written into it. Iva Davies wrote the Icehouse song "Great Southern Land" deliberately fragmented lyrically using the cut-up technique "as I knew I couldn't sum up Australia in four minutes" and the related Primitive Man album's inner sleeve cover art includes strips of torn paper with hand-written lyrics.

Stephen Mallinder of Cabaret Voltaire reported to Inpress magazine's Andrez Bergen that "I do think the manipulation of sound in our early days – the physical act of cutting up tapes, creating tape loops and all that – has a strong reference to Burroughs and Gysin." Another industrial music pioneer, Al Jourgensen of Ministry, named Burroughs and his cut-up technique as the most important influence on how he approached the use of samples.

Many Elephant 6 bands used decoupe as well, one prominent example of this is seen in "Pree-Sisters Swallowing A Donkey's Eye" by Neutral Milk Hotel.

== See also ==
- Asemic writing
- Assemblage (composition)
- Cento (poetry)
- Dissociated press
- Found poetry
- Lexical analysis
- Melitzah
- Plunderphonics
- Stochastic parrot
- Surrealist techniques
- Vocabularyclept poetry
