= Bell Records (1940) =

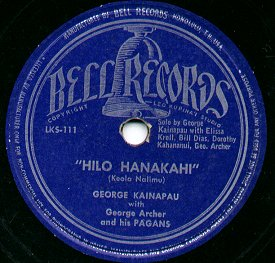
- Founded: 1950s
- Country of origin: United States
- Location: Honolulu, Hawaii

The third record label to use the name Bell Records was based in Honolulu, Hawaii, in the 1950s and 1960s. The label specialized in Hawaiian music. Recordings were made by Bill Fredlund.

== See also ==
- List of record labels
- Bell Records
