= David Kaonohiokala Bray =

Hawaiian kahuna (1889–1968)

David (Daddy) K Bray
- Born: March 5, 1889; Honolulu, Kingdom of Hawaii
- Died: November 11, 1968 (aged 83); Kailua Kona, Hawaii (island)
- Resting place: O'ahu Cemetery
- Other names: Bray, Daddy
- Occupations: Hula, Kahuna, author, actor
- Spouse: Lydia Maunahina Dusson (1889–1956)
- Children: David M Bray (1910–1992); Michael Leilehua Bray (1912–1977); Odetta Bray (1916–1986); Kahala Bray (1917–2003); Edith Bray (1918–); Helen Bray (1920–); Harry Lonokaiolohia Bray (1921–2008)

David Kaonohiokala Bray, known as "Daddy" Bray, (March 5, 1889 – November 11, 1968) was a practicing kahuna in Hawaii during the middle part of the 20th century.

== Biography ==
David Kaonohiokala Bray was born March 5, 1889, in Honolulu, Kingdom of Hawaii, to Missionary David Howard Hitchcock (1832–1899) and Hana Bray (died 1889). Hana died when he was six months old so David had no full siblings, but there were five half siblings from his father's previous marriage to Almeda Eliza Widger (1828–1895): noted American painter D. Howard Hitchcock (1861–1943), Ella Marian Hitchcock (1858–1950), Cora Etta Hitchcock (1859–1951), Almeda Eliza Hitchcock (1863–1895), and Charles Henry Wetmore Hitchcock (1868–1940).

He graduated from the Kamehameha Schools in 1909. In 1910 he married Lydia Maunahinakapu Dusson of Hana, Maui. They had six children. He started his adult life as a lighthouse keeper, trimming the wicks of the big oil lamps at Diamond Head and Barber's Point. In 1917 at age 28, working as a chauffeur in Honolulu, he registered with the draft for World War I, but never served, as he was married with three children and one on the way. By 1940 he was an overseer at Waialee Training School For Boys (reformatory), while wife Lydia was a choreographer for the local orchestra. He was a guard at Oahu prison, and a school cook. In 1955 he was appointed by the Governor to be guide for the throne room of 'Iolani Palace. It was while working in this last job that he was able to serve more regularly as a kahuna.

=== Kahuna lineage ===
Bray's maternal grandmother Namahana Namahana, was married to William Bray III, Grandson of William Bray. Namahana's grandfather was High Priest Holoa'e, a relative of Kamehameha the great and one of the priests present at the arrival of Captain Cook. Bray's wife Lydia claimed royal lineage through her mother, Nakaikaina, but there is no written documentation.

His mother having died when he was young, Bray was Hānai (adopted) and raised by his aunt, kahuna Lukia Kahalaopuna. His great-aunt kahuna Ka'ilianu also trained him. Bray met the kahuna Kuamo'o at an early age and Kuamo'o's son, William Kaniho, later became his teacher. Hawaiian was his first language. Bray said, "I was brought up to study everything Hawaiian, and we always thought the monarchy would be restored. I was preparing for it through my studies."

=== Reviving ancient hula ===
In Paradise of the Pacific, Bray and his wife, Lydia "Mama" Bray, were credited with popularizing the practice of ancient or kahiko hula through an unofficial "hula trial" in 1919. It was their effort to stop nearly a century of denigration of hula by Christian missionaries, and to reinsert hula into everyday public life. Throughout the 1920s and 30s, they taught classes in ancient religious practices, chant, hula, legends, and language. By the 1930s, like other Hawaiians of the time, they created a self-sustaining enterprise as entertainers for tourists to the islands. By the late 1940s, the Bray troupe was well organized and was being produced by the Aloha Festivals and Aloha Week, by major Hawaiian entertainers such as Napua Stevens.

The Brays straddled two worlds, teaching Hawaiians and entertaining tourists. "In the developing tourist economy, Hawaiian cultural practitioners like David and Lydia Bray labored to revive traditional forms of hula but also put themselves on display."

=== Recognition ===
Daddy Bray was "the best known, most active Hawaiian priest of contemporary times."

Bray was commended in a resolution in 1959 by the Territorial House of Representatives. It stated in part:

WHEREAS, due to the great diligence and interest of David K. Bray together with the enthusiastic assistance of his family, he has bridged the deep gap which threatened to doom the Hula and spanned two conflicting schools of thought, to revive and preserve the Hula in its ancient form; and WHEREAS he has for fifty years been a practicing Kahuna, has long been a high priest of the Sons and Daughters of Hawaiian Warriors, [a group of 100 with demonstrated lineage to the court of Kamehameha] and is a master and the leading exponent of the old Hawaiian chants and meles, and for many years has been in great demand for ceremonial blessings at private and public ceremonies, including this House of Representatives...

When asked by a reporter about kahuna power, he said he believed in their power. "Does he have those powers? ‘I won't claim that I have all that power. I understand it, I have that knowledge. But I won't say I have the power.

=== Hollywood ===
By the 1950s, David's daughter Odetta, married Arthur Rosson the Hollywood film producer and actor. This presented David Bray with several opportunities playing a kahuna in various "South Seas films."

=== Teaching ===
To transmit the wisdom of the kahuna, Bray lectured on the mainland to non-Hawaiians in the 1960s. He lectured in most of the mainland coastal cities. "In keeping kahuna principles alive, his contribution has been inestimable."

Despite the fact that Bray was a recognized Kahuna, Max Freedom Long, the inventor of Huna, would have nothing to do with him. When Long first spoke of Bray in his newsletter, he admitted that Bray told him "how much he disagreed with my conclusions." But Long wrote, "I am not at all sure that he has ever read any of my books, but feel that if he has, he fails to understand my reasons for arriving at certain conclusions." Years later, Long denigrated him in one of his Bulletins:

Mr. Bray once visited me, and I tried to compare notes with him on our two versions of Huna, but we soon gave up the discussion because the versions were too far apart to be brought within speaking distance. Mr. Bray would have none of the three selves or three manas or three shadowy bodies. To him the kahunas believed in a single soul, a single mana and in an ancestral spirit or Aumakua which was not part of the triune man and simply the deified soul of an ancestor. He would have none of my method of taking the meanings of Hawaiian words from the several meanings of the roots (nor would my friends Charles Kenn or Theodore Kelsey—-both by way of being authorities on the language.)

== Selected filmography ==
- Bird of Paradise (1951) (uncredited) .... Chanter
- Captain David Grief .... Naku (1 episode, 1957)- A Son of the Sun (1957) TV episode (as David Bray) .... Naku
