= The Word Hoard =

Novel by William S. Burroughs

The Word Hoard was a large body of text (approximately 1000 typewriter pages) produced by author William S. Burroughs between roughly 1954 and 1958.

Material from the word hoard was the basis for Naked Lunch and the Interzone collection, as well as much of The Soft Machine and minor parts of Nova Express and The Ticket That Exploded. Central to the "Word Hoard" was the 200-page "Interzone" manuscript that Allen Ginsberg, Jack Kerouac and Alan Ansen helped organise and type in Tangier in spring 1957, and which became, with later additions, Naked Lunch in 1959.

== The Nova Trilogy ==
The Soft Machine, The Ticket That Exploded and Nova Express form a trilogy, sometimes dubbed The Nova Trilogy or The Cut-Up Trilogy. The overlaps between Naked Lunch and The Soft Machine confirm that both drew on the same body of manuscripts, but in the case of the other two volumes it is clear that most of the material did not. In 2014, Grove Press published new, 'Restored' editions, edited by Oliver Harris, which established their complex manuscript and publishing histories.

In The Beat Book from 1974, Burroughs claims that when he edits a novel, about half of the material is cut away and later recycled in the next novel. This explains the phenomenon of the plots and characters fading in and out from the different books.

Although Burroughs never used the term himself, The Nova Trilogy was intended by the author as "a mythology for the space age."
