= Dead Fingers Talk =

Novel by William S. Burroughs

- 1963 British hardcover edition.
- Author: William S. Burroughs
- Language: English
- Publisher: Calder
- Publication date: 1963
- Publication place: United Kingdom
- Media type: Print (Hardcover and Paperback)
- ISBN: 978-0714501871

Dead Fingers Talk, first published in 1963, was the fifth novel published by Beat Generation author William S. Burroughs. The book was originally published by John Calder in association with Olympia Press.

The book combined sections from three of Burroughs' earlier novels, Naked Lunch, The Soft Machine and The Ticket That Exploded, and rearranged them in an attempt to create a new narrative. It is sometimes referred to as a compilation, but this is technically incorrect. Its plot cannot be easily described, although it can be said to focus upon conspiracy and the hero getting away from the police.

Although the publisher claimed that it contained previously unpublished material, this was not identified until the Restored edition of 2020, edited by Burroughs scholar Oliver Harris, who argued that the text's novelty in any case depended on recognising it as an early experimental remix or mash-up.

== Reception ==
Dead Fingers Talk, like many of Burroughs' works, was controversial upon its release. It was the subject of a scathing review in the Times Literary Supplement that resulted in a war of words between supporters and detractors of the novel (and Burroughs' in general) that played out in the magazine's letters page for months.

Never published or translated outside the UK, the book itself is considered one of the rarer of Burroughs' novels, and was out of print for almost 50 years before the Restored edition 2020.
