= Playback (technique) =

Technique in chaos magic

In chaos magic, playback is a form of magical practice developed by William S. Burroughs, primarily as a way of placing curses on people or places. Burroughs was a part of the chaos magic movement, and this technique – along with others such as the cut-up technique – were further developed and commented on by later chaos magicians such as Genesis P-Orridge, Phil Hine and Dave Lee.

== The technique ==
The technique consists of using a portable tape recorder to record audio of the target location, then revisiting the location over a number of days and playing back the audio at low or subliminal levels. Burroughs described the effect as "recording the target's own base shittiness, and then playing it back to him at subliminal levels".

I have frequently observed that this simple operation making recordings and taking pictures of some location you wish to discommode or destroy, then playing recordings back and taking more pictures – will result in accidents, fires, removals, especially the last. The target moves...

Elaborating, Cabell McLean has stated that "the effect is subtle but profound, cumulative with time, and tends to multiply or magnify the negative aspects of the target far beyond the target’s ability to control". Burroughs himself discussed his use of the playback technique to lay a curse on the Moka Coffee Bar:

Here is a sample operation carried out against the Moka Bar at 29 Frith Street, London, W1, beginning on August 3, 1972. Reverse Thursday. Reason for operation was outrageous and unprovoked discourtesy and poisonous cheesecake. Now to close in on the Moka Bar. Record. Take pictures. Stand around outside. Let them see me. They are seething around in there... Playback would come later with more pictures... Playback was carried out a number of times with more pictures. Their business fell off. They kept shorter and shorter hours. October 30, 1972, the Moka Bar closed. The location was taken over by the Queen's Snack Bar.

Burroughs enhanced the basic technique over time, splicing "trouble noises" into the recordings – "recordings of alarm bells, breaking glass, fire engines, as well as sound effects of explosions, machineguns, and riots recorded from TV" – and combining it with the technique of cutting out the image of the intended target from photographs, with the hope of literally removing the target from existence.

== See also ==
- Egregore
- Gnosis (chaos magic)
- Kia (magic)
- Sigil (magic)
- Synchromysticism
