= The Nova Trilogy =

Novel by William S. Burroughs

The Nova Trilogy or The Cut-up Trilogy is a name commonly given by critics to a series of three experimental novels by William S. Burroughs.

== Volumes ==
- The Soft Machine
- The Ticket That Exploded
- Nova Express

== Trilogy ==
The trilogy of experimental novels is composed of The Soft Machine (1961, revised 1966 and 1968), The Ticket That Exploded (1962, revised 1967) and Nova Express (1964). Like Naked Lunch, The Soft Machine derived in part from The Word Hoard, a number of manuscripts Burroughs wrote mainly in Tangier, between 1954 and 1958.

All three novels use the cut-up technique that Burroughs invented in cooperation with painter and poet Brion Gysin and computer programmer Ian Sommerville. Commenting on the trilogy in an interview, Burroughs said that he was "attempting to create a new mythology for the space age".

In 2014, restored editions of the three novels were published, edited by Burroughs scholar Oliver Harris. The new editions made a number of changes to the texts and included notes and previously unpublished materials that showed the complexity of the books' manuscript histories and the precision with which Burroughs used his methods.

== Style ==
The Trilogy is viewed by critics as being one of Burroughs's most radical experimentations with narrative form. All three novels are crafted using the cut-up method, in which existing texts are cut into various pieces and put back together in random order. The technique was combined with images of Gysin's painting and sounds from Somerville's tape recorders.

Due to the cut-up method's random approach to text, Burroughs repeatedly defended his writing style against critics, explaining that the cut-up method created possibilities for mixing text written by himself and other writers and helped deemphasize the traditional role of text. As a result, the novels that make up the trilogy are even more sporadic in plot and structure than Naked Lunch. Burroughs spoke of the trilogy as a "sequel", and "mathematical extension" of the themes and techniques of Naked Lunch.

The Soft Machine is the first book in the trilogy, and is a compilation of descriptive and interchangeable scenes, which delve further into the sexual and biological issues previously explored in Naked Lunch. Critic Mac Tonnies described the main themes in the novel as including "time travel, media bombardment, and out-of-body travel."

In The Ticket that Exploded, Burroughs deals with tape recorders (an allegory Burroughs links to the destruction of control systems), cybernetic pleasure farms, and homosexual erotic exploitations on the planet Venus. Burroughs bypasses linear structure, pattern, and narrative in the novel (i.e., a clear beginning, middle, and end), instead deconstructing traditional organization and composition.

Nova Express follows Inspector Lee as he tracks down members of the Nova Mob. It is considered by critics as being one of the best books in the trilogy due to its graphic descriptions and fragmented cyber world.

The Nova Trilogy (as well as a passage in the book on the cut-up technique named Minutes to Go) feature the character Hassan-i Sabbah and his final words Nothing is true—everything is permitted. Burroughs was introduced to Hassan through Betty Bouthoul, who had written an extensive book on the assassins titled The Master of the Assassins (French title Le grand maître des Assassins). The full story of Burroughs' interest in Hassan Sabbah was told in the 2023 book, Two Assassins, by Oliver Harris and Farid Ghadami.

== Influence on popular culture ==
The influence of the trilogy can be seen in many places. David Bowie and Brian Eno have employed the cut-up method in composing their lyrics. The band Soft Machine is named after the book. DJ Spooky calls himself "That Subliminal Kid" after a member of The Nova Mob. After Hüsker Dü disbanded, Grant Hart formed a band called Nova Mob. Many avant-garde and electronic musicians including Genesis P-Orridge, Negativland, John Oswald, and other techno and industrial music artists have created compositions using the technique of cutting up audio tape and rearranging the pieces to create new sounds. The German film Decoder, which stars P-Orridge and Burroughs, is largely based on ideas in these novels. Iggy Pop, in his song "Lust For Life", mentions Nova Mob member Johnny Yen, and sings "well, that's like hypnotizing chickens", a line from The Ticket That Exploded.

== Collections ==
To date the three novels that form the Nova Trilogy have yet to be published in a single-volume omnibus. The closest thus far was the Three Novels collection (ISBN 0802130844) published by Grove Press in March 1988 which includes The Soft Machine and Nova Express but substitutes The Wild Boys in place of The Ticket That Exploded.
