= Queer (film) =

2024 film by Luca Guadagnino

- Theatrical release poster
- Directed by: Luca Guadagnino
- Screenplay by: Justin Kuritzkes
- Based on: Queer by William S. Burroughs
- Produced by: Lorenzo Mieli; Luca Guadagnino
- Starring: Daniel Craig; Drew Starkey; Jason Schwartzman; Henrique Zaga; Lesley Manville
- Cinematography: Sayombhu Mukdeeprom
- Edited by: Marco Costa
- Music by: Trent Reznor; Atticus Ross
- Production companies: Fremantle North America; The Apartment Pictures; Frenesy Film Company
- Distributed by: Lucky Red (Italy); A24 (United States)
- Release dates: September 3, 2024 (Venice); November 27, 2024 (United States); April 17, 2025 (Italy)
- Running time: 137 minutes
- Countries: Italy; United States
- Languages: English; Spanish
- Budget: €48 million
- Box office: $7 million

Queer (titled on-screen as William S. Burroughs' Queer) is a 2024 period romantic drama film directed by Luca Guadagnino from a screenplay by Justin Kuritzkes, based on the 1985 novella by William S. Burroughs. Set in 1950s Mexico City and Ecuador, the film follows an outcast American expatriate (Daniel Craig) who becomes infatuated with a much younger man (Drew Starkey); Jason Schwartzman, Henry Zaga, and Lesley Manville also star.

Queer premiered at the 81st Venice International Film Festival on September 3, 2024, where it played in-competition for the Golden Lion. It was given a limited theatrical release in the United States on November 27, by A24, and was released nationwide on December 13. The film has received generally positive reviews from critics and was named one of the Top Ten Films of 2024 by the National Board of Review, where Craig was awarded the Best Actor prize. Craig was also nominated for the Golden Globe, the Critics' Choice, and the Screen Actors Guild awards for his performance.

== Plot ==
=== Chapter 1: How Do You Like Mexico? ===
In 1950, William Lee is an American immigrant living in Mexico City, passing time by bar hopping and indulging in sex with younger men. One evening, he catches sight of Eugene Allerton, a young GI who is also an American expatriate.

Lee grows obsessed with Allerton, pursuing him across various bars, hoping to gain his affection. The pair establish a relationship, but Allerton maintains an emotional distance from Lee and is often seen with a woman, despite Lee's obvious desire for connection. Allerton explains this by suggesting he does not see himself as "queer" in the same way as Lee does.

=== Chapter 2: Travel Companions ===
Lee invites Allerton to travel with him to South America in the hopes of finding yagé, a plant said to offer telepathic abilities. Allerton seems reluctant but eventually accepts Lee's invitation. While on the trip, Lee's drug dependency makes him seek out medical opiates with a claim of dysentery. Allerton continues to keep Lee at a distance. Lee hears of a doctor living in Quito who could assist him in his search for yagé.

=== Chapter 3: The Botanist in the Jungle ===
The two men arrive in the Ecuadorian jungle to meet Dr. Cotter, who warms to the men and creates ayahuasca for them by brewing the yagé found in the forest. Lee and Allerton experience vivid hallucinations from the drug. They vomit out their hearts, communicate telepathically, and meld their bodies together. Allerton tells Lee that he’s not queer, but rather "disembodied", which Lee had said in one of his dreams. The next morning, Dr. Cotter suggests the men stay to further explore the effects of yagé. However, Allerton is keen to leave and Lee follows.

=== Epilogue ===
Two years later, Lee returns to Mexico City. He is told that Allerton has taken another trip to South America as a guide for an army colonel and has not been seen or heard from since.

In a dream, Lee discovers Allerton in a hotel room adjacent to his. Allerton engages Lee in a round of William Tell by placing a glass on his own head. Lee shoots Allerton in the head, then holds his body until it vanishes, before he vanishes himself. Lee finds himself in his hotel room, now an elderly man. Lying on his bed, he imagines a still-youthful Allerton joining and comforting him.

== Cast ==
- Daniel Craig as William Lee, a fictionalized version of William S. Burroughs
- Drew Starkey as Eugene Allerton
- Jason Schwartzman as Joe Guidry
- Lesley Manville as Dr. Cotter
- Henrique Zaga as Winston Moor
- Drew Droege as John Dumé
- Andra Ursuța as Mary
- Ariel Schulman as Tom Weston
- Andrés Duprat as Dr. Hernandez
- Omar Apollo as Chimu Bar guy
- David Lowery as Jim Cochran
- Lisandro Alonso as Mr. Cotter
- Michaël Borremans as doctor

== Production ==
=== Development ===
Guadagnino had wanted to make an adaptation of William S. Burroughs' 1985 novella Queer since he read the book when he was 17. In April 2022, he mentioned the book to screenwriter Justin Kuritzkes while they were on set for their film Challengers (2024) in Boston. Guadagnino bought Kuritzkes a copy, which he read and loved. Producer Lorenzo Mieli found the rights to the book, which they secured after a call with James Grauerholz, the literary executor of Burroughs' estate. Kuritzkes began writing the script while they were still working on Challengers. The book was published unfinished, so Kuritzkes and Guadagnino consulted Burroughs' scholar Oliver Harris on how to give the text a fitting ending, while maintaining the author's vision. Guadagnino described Queer as his most personal film and a tribute to the films of Powell and Pressburger, such as The Red Shoes (1948), saying "I think they would appreciate the sex scenes in Queer, which are numerous and quite scandalous".

=== Casting ===
It was announced in December 2022 that Daniel Craig was in talks to star in the film. Craig was cast after Guadagnino's agent Bryan Lourd had sent the script to the actor. Guadagnino recalled: "Daniel and I were on the phone a week later. Then, a week passed, and he was in the movie." In April 2023, Lesley Manville, Jason Schwartzman, and Henry Zaga were revealed to be in the cast. Starkey was cast after an audition tape he had made for another project landed in front of Guadagnino. Guadagnino consulted with Craig on casting Starkey, and Craig, after watching the tape, told Guadagnino, "That's the guy." They auditioned three hundred people for the role. In June 2024, it was reported that directors Ariel Schulman, Lisandro Alonso, and David Lowery would be appearing in the film.

=== Filming ===
Principal photography began in Rome, Italy, on April 29, 2023. The project was filmed at Cinecittà Studios. Additional scenes were shot in Quito, Ecuador for the last act of the film. Production wrapped on June 29, 2023. Jonathan Anderson, creative director of Loewe, served as costume designer, marking his second collaboration with Guadagnino following Challengers.

=== Post-production ===
The original cut submitted to and accepted by the Venice Film Festival was 185 to 200 minutes long before being cut down to its final length of 135 minutes.

=== Music ===
Trent Reznor and Atticus Ross composed the score for Queer, their third collaboration with Guadagnino following Bones and All in 2022 and Challengers in 2024. The Spanish-language "Te Maldigo", performed by Omar Apollo, who stars in the film, was the first song released from the soundtrack. The album featuring the original score was released on December 6, 2024, through Milan Records; the first track "Vaster than Empires", performed by Reznor and Brazilian composer Caetano Veloso, contains lyrics from Burroughs' final diary entry. On December 13, "Vaster than Empires" was rereleased featuring Alan Sparhawk and BJ Burton instead of Veloso.

The film itself includes numerous tracks by prominent artists including: Nirvana, Sinéad O’Connor, New Order, Prince, Italian alternative rock band Verdena, and jazz musicians Benny Goodman, Charlie Parker, and Dizzy Gillespie.

== Release ==
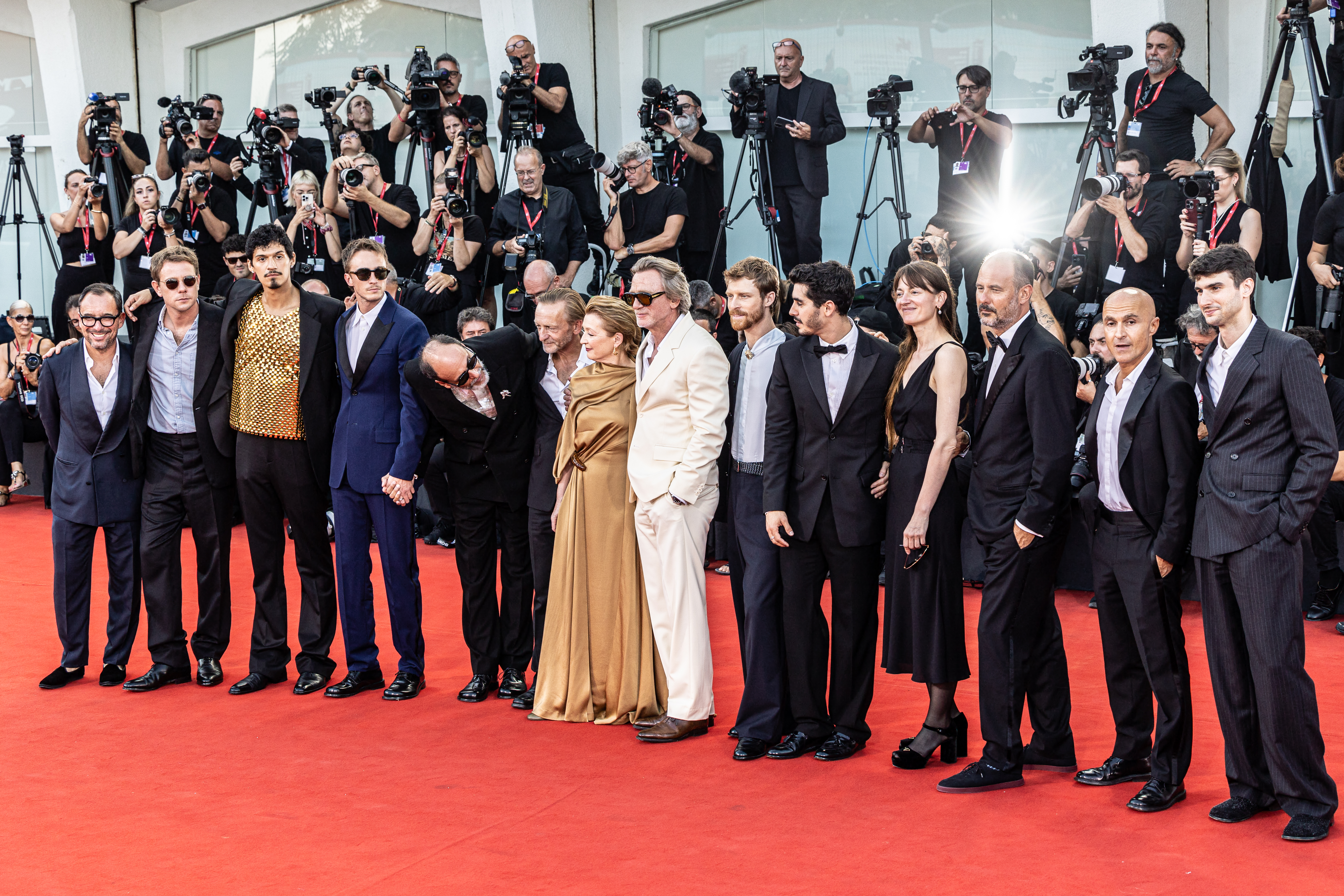
The cast of Queer at the 81st Venice International Film Festival

Queer had its world premiere in-competition at the 81st Venice International Film Festival on September 3, 2024. In August 2024, the film was the first announced in the Spotlight Gala of the 62nd New York Film Festival.

In September 2024, A24 acquired the film's distribution rights for the United States. In October 2024, Mubi acquired the film rights for multiple regions, including streaming in Italy. The film was banned in Turkey, leading Mubi to cancel a film festival which the film was set to open in November 2024.

The film had a limited theatrical release in the United States on November 27, 2024, before nationwide releases in both the US and the United Kingdom on December 13. It was released theatrically in Italy on April 17, 2025, by Lucky Red.

With a worldwide box office of $7,020,863 against a budget of €48 million (or $50 million) the film failed to break even by a large amount and is considered a box-office bomb.

== Reception ==
=== Critical response ===
On the review aggregator website Rotten Tomatoes, 77% of 242 critics gave the film a positive, with an average rating of 7/10. The critics consensus on the website reads: "A phantasmagorical distillation of William S. Burroughs' preoccupations that's by turns meandering and vital, Queer marks one of Daniel Craig's most sterling performances yet." Metacritic assigned the film a weighted average score of 72 out of 100 based on 50 critic reviews, indicating a "generally favorable" response.

Craig was widely praised for his performance, with The Guardian's Peter Bradshaw describing it as a "really funny, open, generous performance – perhaps the only disadvantage is that he upstages Starkey".

Amy Taubin, writing for Film Comment, wrote that she was "knocked out by Luca Guadagnino's Queer, a swooningly gorgeous film whose bloody heart and loose piriformis muscle is Daniel Craig's performance as Bill Lee", adding that the scene in which Lee injects heroin seems to be "one of the most transcendent in film history".

The Times found the film to be visually appealing but lacking in substance.

Director John Waters ranked Queer second on a list of his favorite movies of 2024, writing that Craig "may be queerbait for taking on the gay beatnik role of William Burroughs's alter ego, but I'm all for it." Filmmakers Agnieszka Holland, Edward Berger, Denis Villeneuve, Azazel Jacobs, and Celine Song have also cited it as among their favorite films of 2024. PopMatters included it on their list of "Best of 2024".

=== Accolades ===
Award	Date of ceremony	Category	Recipient(s)	Result	Ref.
Venice International Film Festival	7 September 2024	Golden Lion	Luca Guadagnino	Nominated	
Venice International Film Festival	7 September 2024	Queer Lion	Luca Guadagnino	Nominated	
National Board of Review	4 December 2024	Top Ten Films	Queer	Won (Note: This award does not have a single winner, but recognizes multiple films.)	
National Board of Review	4 December 2024	Best Actor	Daniel Craig	Won	
European Film Awards	7 December 2024	European Actor	Daniel Craig	Nominated	
Washington DC Area Film Critics Association	8 December 2024	Best Actor	Daniel Craig	Nominated	
San Diego Film Critics Society	9 December 2024	Best Actor	Daniel Craig	Runner-up	
San Francisco Bay Area Film Critics Circle	15 December 2024	Best Actor	Daniel Craig	Nominated	
St. Louis Film Critics Association	15 December 2024	Best Actor	Daniel Craig	Nominated	
Florida Film Critics Circle	20 December 2024	Best Actor	Daniel Craig	Nominated	
Florida Film Critics Circle	20 December 2024	Best Adapted Screenplay	Justin Kuritzkes	Won	
Golden Globe Awards	5 January 2025	Best Actor in a Motion Picture – Drama	Daniel Craig	Nominated	
Austin Film Critics Association	6 January 2025	Best Actor	Daniel Craig	Nominated	
Alliance of Women Film Journalists	7 January 2025	Best Actor	Daniel Craig	Nominated	
AARP Movies for Grownups Awards	11 January 2025	Best Actor	Daniel Craig	Nominated	
AARP Movies for Grownups Awards	11 January 2025	Best Supporting Actress	Lesley Manville	Nominated	
Satellite Awards	26 January 2025	Best Actor in a Motion Picture – Drama	Daniel Craig	Nominated	
AACTA International Awards	7 February 2025	Best Actor	Daniel Craig	Nominated	
Critics' Choice Movie Awards	7 February 2025	Best Actor	Daniel Craig	Nominated	
Artios Awards	12 February 2025	Outstanding Achievement in Casting – Big Budget Feature (Drama)	Jessica Ramone	Nominated	
Screen Actors Guild Awards	23 February 2025	Outstanding Performance by a Male Actor in a Leading Role	Daniel Craig	Nominated	
Golden Trailer Awards	29 May 2025	Best Romance	A24 / Mark Woollen & Associates (for "Trailer")	Nominated	
