= Robert Gibbons (poet) =

American poet

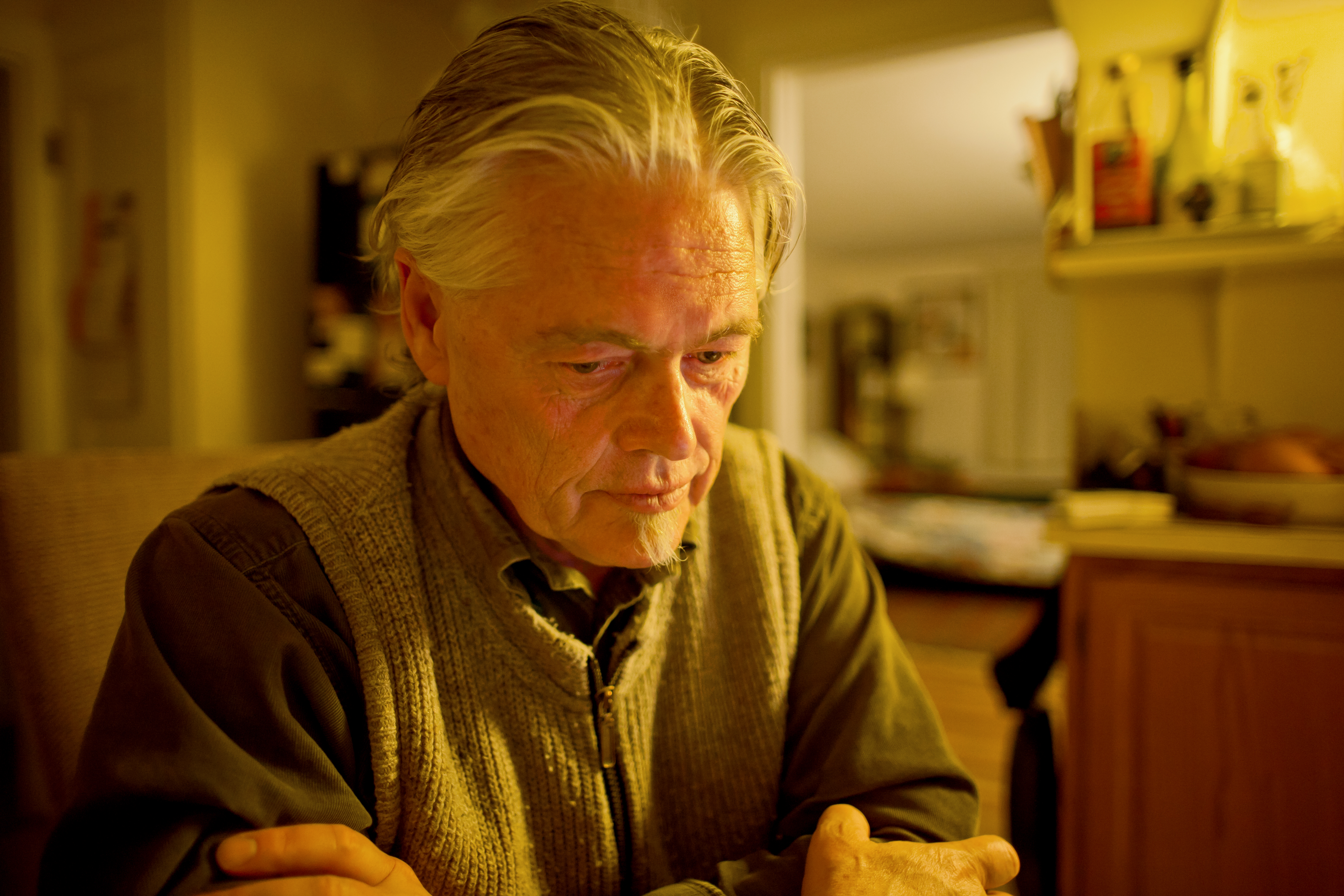
- Robert Gibbons (photo by Joseph Schuyler)
- Born: October 4, 1946 (age 79); Salem, Massachusetts, U.S.
- Education: Bishop Fenwick High School; Northwestern University; Simmons College
- Occupations: Poet; prose writer; editor
- Spouse: Kathleen Thompson

Robert Gibbons (born October 4, 1946) is an American poet, prose writer, and editor.

== Early life and education ==
Gibbons was born and grew up in Salem, Massachusetts, in a multigenerational household where he was exposed to a great deal of storytelling. Gibbons graduated from Bishop Fenwick High School, and received his undergraduate degree from Northeastern University in 1969. During his sophomore year, 1967, he traveled throughout Europe for three months. He received his graduate degree from Simmons College, Boston, 1988, and was elected to Beta Phi Mu.

== Early writing ==
Gibbons began writing in earnest in 1972, after meeting Robert Hellman in Gloucester, Massachusetts, who'd moved from New York in order to make a film with Thorpe Feidt on Charles Olson. Feidt published Gibbons' first 20 poems in his magazines Mail & Red Crow. Gibbons was 24 at the time. After teaching high school English in Gloucester for two years, he took a year off to write, then worked second shift at O'Donnell-Usen (formerly Birdseye Frozen Foods) fish plant on the Fort. After a year there, he and his first wife Judith traveled cross-country, ending up in Mexico.

After living in Mexico City and Zihuatenejo, the couple met painter Fernando Sanchez, who was finishing a mural by David Siqueiros; poet, Ali Chumacero; & filmmaker, Manuel Avila Camacho, with whom they traveled to Veracruz in order to make the film La Playa. Upon their return to Mexico City they were invited to live at the filmmaker's estate. Gibbons' first chapbook, Below California, Below This, was based on this five-month journey.

Dan Carr published Yellow & Black in 1980 under the auspices of his Four Zoas Night House Press, Boston. The Woman in the Paragraph appeared two years later by Deborah Wender's Cat Island Press, Salem. Carr included work by Gibbons in his Nighthouse Anthology: 48 Younger American Poets, 1982.

Mark Olson's Innerer Klang Press in Charlestown published a succession of fine press chapbooks: Ardors, 1986; Lover, Is This Exile?, 1989; and Of DC, published in 1992, when Gibbons worked at the National Gallery of Art Library, where he met Robert Rauschenberg, who agreed to design the cover. Gibbons' work was praised by Sam Hamill in a review in the magazine Bookways."

Mark Olson published Gibbons' This Vanishing Architecture in 2001.

== Recent writing ==
In 2004, Gibbons succeeded Claire Barbetti as poetry and fiction editor of Janus Head, where over the next eight years he published works by Robert Bly, Andrei Codrescu, Clayton Eshleman, William Heyen, Richard Hoffman, Fanny Howe, Pattiann Rogers, & Jerome Rothenberg, along with translations of Paul Celan, Pablo Neruda, Tomas Tranströmer, & Cesar Vallejo. Barbetti, in turn, established Mise Publications in Pittsburgh that year, publishing Body of Time, & writing a scholarly preface for the book. It was Gibbons' third book in the same year, following Streets for Two Dancers & The Book of Assassinations, Six Gallery Press.

Gibbons' political writing emerged in 2006. In September of the previous year, he and his second wife, Kathleen (née Thompson) marched with other protesters against two wars & the Bush Administration's mishandling of Hurricane Katrina. His work was included in the anthology, The Other Side of Sorrow: Poets Speak Out about Conflict, War, and Peace published by The Poetry Society of New Hampshire, edited by Patricia Frisella & Cicely Buckley. He received a $10,000 grant from the John Anson Kittredge Educational Fund in order to travel to Scotland & read his work at the Poetry & Politics Conference held at the University of Stirling in July 2006. Ben Bollig, Oxford University also participated in this conference and has featured Gibbons' work in writing and read it at subsequent Oxford events. In 2013 Gibbons was the poetry keynote at the second annual European Beat Studies Network conference, held in Aalborg, Denmark.

Gibbons wrote eight books in eight years. His newest publisher, Geoff Gronlund, Nine Point Publishing, (Rhythm of Desire & Resistance, [limited edition chapbook], This Time, & Traveling Companion) sent the author to the opening of the Clyfford Still Museum in Denver in November 2011, where he met with longtime friend and curator of the inaugural exhibition, David Anfam. The result of the trip is a series of prose pieces tracing the similarities in approaches to art in language by Charles Olson & in paint by Clyfford Still. The resulting chapbook, Olson/Still: Crossroad appeared from Nine Point Publishing in 2013 in an edition of one hundred copies.

== Books ==
- To Know Others, Various & Free (Bridgton, Maine: Nine Point Publishing, 2013)
- Traveling Companion (Bridgton, Maine: Nine Point Publishing, 2012). This is his most widely held book; According to WorldCat, the book is held in 243 libraries
- This Time (Bridgton, Maine: Nine Point Publishing, 2011)
- Jagged Timeline (Denmark: Eyecorner Press, 2010) bilingual, translated to Danish by Bent Sørensen
- Travels Inside the Archive (Brownfield, Maine: Edge of Maine, 2009)
- Beyond Time: New & Selected Work, 1977-2007 (Amherst, New York: Trivium Publications, 2008)
- Body of Time (Pittsburgh, Pennsylvania: Mise Publications, 2004)
- The Book of Assassinations (Geneva, Ohio: Six Gallery Press, 2004)
- Streets for Two Dancers (Macon, Georgia: Six Gallery Press, 2004)

== Chapbooks ==
- The Degas (Asheville, NC: Innerer Klang Press, 2013)
- Olson/Still: Crossroad (Bridgton, Maine: Nine Point Publishing, 2013).
- Rhythm of Desire & Resistance (Bridgton, Maine: Nine Point Publishing, 2011)
- This Vanishing Architecture (Charlestown, Massachusetts: Innerer Klang, 2001)
- Of DC (Charlestown, Massachusetts: Innerer Klang, 1992)
- Lover, Is This Exile? (Charlestown, Massachusetts: Innerer Klang, 1989)
- Ardors (Charlestown, Massachusetts: Innerer Klang, 1986)
- The Woman in the Paragraph (Salem, Massachusetts: Cat Island Press, 1982)
- Yellow & Black (Boston, Massachusetts: Four Zoas Night House, 1980)
- Below California, Below This (Gloucester, Massachusetts: The Mermaid of Cape Ann Press, 1978)
