= Nova Express =

Novel by William S. Burroughs

- First edition
- Author: William S. Burroughs
- Cover artist: Roy Kuhlman
- Language: English
- Series: The Nova Trilogy
- Genre: Science fiction novel
- Publisher: Grove Press
- Publication date: November 9, 1964
- Publication place: United States
- Media type: Print (hardback & paperback)
- LC Class: 64-10597

Nova Express is a 1964 novel by American author William S. Burroughs. It was written using the 'fold-in' method, a version of the cut-up method, developed by Burroughs with Brion Gysin, of enfolding snippets of different texts into the novel. It is part of The Nova Trilogy, or "Cut-Up Trilogy', together with The Soft Machine and The Ticket That Exploded. Burroughs considered the trilogy a "sequel" or "mathematical" continuation of Naked Lunch.

Nova Express was nominated for the Nebula Award for Best Novel in 1965. It is listed in David Pringle's 1985 book Science Fiction: The 100 Best Novels.

In 2014, Grove Press published a "Restored Text" edition, edited by Oliver Harris, which included a number of corrections and added an introduction and extensive notes. The introduction argued for the care with which Burroughs used his methods and established the text's complex manuscript histories.

== Interpretation ==
Nova Express is a social commentary on human and machine control of life. The Nova Mob—Sammy the Butcher, Green Tony, Iron Claws, The Brown Artist, Jacky Blue Note, Limestone John, Izzy the Push, Hamburger Mary, Paddy The Sting, The Subliminal Kid, Blue Dinosaur, Mr. and Mrs. D —are viruses, "defined as the three-dimensional coordinate point of a controller" ... "which invade the human body and in the process produce language." These Nova Criminals represent society, culture, and government, and have taken control by the use of word and image. Inspector Lee and the rest of the Nova Police are left fighting for the rest of humanity in the power struggle. "The Nova Police can be compared to apomorphine, a regulating instance that need not continue and has no intention of continuing after its work is done." The police are focused on "first-order addictions of junkies, homosexuals, dissidents, and criminals; if these criminals vanish, the police must create more in order to justify their own survival." The Nova Police depend upon the Nova Criminals for existence; if the criminals cease to exist, so do the police. "They act like apomorphine, the nonaddictive cure for morphine addiction that Burroughs used and then promoted for many years."

Control is the main theme of the novel, and Burroughs attempts to use language to break down the walls of culture, the biggest control machine. He uses Inspector Lee to express his own thoughts about the world. "The purpose of my writing is to expose and arrest Nova Criminals. In Naked Lunch, Soft Machine and Nova Express I show who they are and what they are doing and what they will do if they are not arrested. [...] With your help we can occupy The Reality Studio and retake their universe of Fear Death and Monopoly." As Burroughs battles with the self, what is human, and what is "reality", he finds that language is the only way to maintain dominance over the "powerful instruments of control", which are the most prevalent enemies of human society.

== Reception ==
While Naked Lunch was an initial shock to the literary community, Nova Express was considered the end of Burroughs's stylistic experiment and of the Nova Trilogy. The novel received more praise on its own, as it was often compared to the other books in the trilogy and Naked Lunch. Eric Mottram stated that although "Burroughs's repetitive narcotic and homoerotic fantasies become tedious in sections of his third novel ... it is from these obsessions that his most powerful work develops."

Reviewing the novel for a genre audience, Judith Merril compared Nova Express to "the surreality of certain dreams, or the intense fascination of a confusion of new impressions in real life."
