= Gnosis (chaos magic) =

Altered state of consciousness in chaos magic

In chaos magic, gnosis or the gnostic state refers to an altered state of consciousness in which a person's mind is focused on only one point, thought, or goal and all other thoughts are thrust out. The gnostic state is used to bypass the "filter" of the conscious mind – something thought to be necessary for working most forms of magic.

Since it takes years of training to master this sort of Zen-like meditative ability, chaos magicians employ a variety of other ways to attain a "brief 'no-mind' state" in which to work magic.

== Etymology ==
Gnosis is the common Greek noun for knowledge (γνῶσις, gnôsis, f.). A related term is the adjective gnostikos, "cognitive", a reasonably common adjective in Classical Greek. Plato uses the plural adjective γνωστικοί – gnostikoi and the singular feminine adjective γνωστικὴ ἐπιστήμη – gnostike episteme in his Politikos where Gnostike episteme was also used to indicate one's aptitude.

== Chaos magic ==
According to chaos magic, successfully executing an act of magic is dependent on bypassing the conscious mind. To achieve this, it is necessary to enter into an altered state of consciousness in which thoughts are stilled, and awareness is held on a single point. Only then will the ritual, sigil or working flow unimpeded into the unconscious, from where it works its effects. Without any etymological justification, the earliest texts on chaos magic, Liber Null (1978) and The Book of Results (1978), both refer to this state of one-pointedness as "gnosis":

The particular state of mind required has a name in every tradition: No-mind. Stopping the internal dialogue, passing through the eye of the needle, ain or nothing, samadhi, or onepointedness. In this book it will be known as Gnosis. It is an extension of the magical trance by other means.

In asserting the necessity of attaining such a state, the earliest chaos magicians were following the example set by artist and occultist Austin Osman Spare. In Spare's magical system, magic was thought to operate by using symbols to communicate desire to something Spare termed "Kia" (a sort of universal mind, of which individual human consciousnesses are aspects) via the "passage" of the unconscious. These desires would then grow, unconsciously, into "obsessions", which would culminate in magical results occurring in reality.

Aleister Crowley had also argued that the key to magic was an altered state of consciousness, whether attained through meditation, sexual practices or the use of drugs. However, the real breakthrough of the early chaos magicians was the realisation that there are many states of exhaustion, arousal or inhibition that cause consciousness to briefly "blink", sidestepping the need for years of meditative attainment.

Three main types of gnosis are described in chaos magic texts:

- Inhibitory gnosis is a form of deep meditation into a trance state of mind. This type of gnosis uses slow and regular breathing techniques, absent thought processes, progressive muscle relaxation, self-induction and self-hypnosis techniques. Means employed may also include fasting, sleeplessness, sensory deprivation and hypnotic or trance-inducing drugs.
- Ecstatic gnosis describes a mindlessness reached through intense arousal. It is aimed to be reached through sexual excitation, intense emotions, flagellation, dance, drumming, chanting, sensory overload, hyperventilation and the use of disinhibitory or hallucinogenic drugs.
- Indifferent vacuity was described by Phil Hine and Jan Fries as a third method. Here the intended spell is cast parenthetically, so it does not raise much thought to suppress.

== See also ==
- Gnosticism
- Samadhi
