= Queer (novel) =

1985 novella by William S. Burroughs

- First edition
- Author: William S. Burroughs
- Language: English
- Publisher: Viking Press
- Publication date: November 1985
- Publication place: United States
- Media type: Print (Hardback & Paperback)
- Pages: 208
- ISBN: 0-670-80833-4
- OCLC: 12050392
- Dewey Decimal: 813/.54 19
- LC Class: PS3552.U75 Q8 1985
- Preceded by: Junkie

Queer is a novella by American author William S. Burroughs. It is partially a sequel to his 1953 novella Junkie. It was first published in 1985, and adapted into a feature-length film of the same name in 2024.

== Plot ==
In 1951, William Lee is a disillusioned American expatriate living in Mexico City after fleeing U.S. drug charges. Lee is now experiencing withdrawal and is left with a psychological and existential void. To fill this emptiness, he drinks heavily and indulges in erratic, often desperate behavior. Lee spends his days frequenting cheap bars, interacting with other foreigners, and struggling with his growing sense of loneliness. His narration is detached and often filled with crude, satirical humor. He is an awkward, self-conscious figure, socially inept but desperate for human connection.

Lee becomes fixated on Eugene Allerton, a young, handsome ex-Navy man. Allerton is heterosexual but passively accepts Lee’s company, largely out of convenience. He is depicted as indifferent, often tolerating Lee’s advances with an air of amusement or mild annoyance. Lee tries to impress Allerton with exaggerated, bizarre stories, often monologues filled with grotesque humor and science-fiction-like fantasies. These stories serve as both an attempt to entertain Allerton and a reflection of Lee’s alienation. His awkward attempts at seduction, however, consistently fail, highlighting the unbridgeable gap between them.

As their relationship develops, Lee grows more dependent on Allerton, practically throwing himself at him despite the lack of reciprocation. His desperation intensifies as he showers Allerton with money, gifts, and elaborate plans for their future, which Allerton mostly ignores or dismisses. Hoping to deepen their bond, Lee suggests a trip through South America in search of yagé (ayahuasca), a powerful hallucinogenic plant rumored to grant telepathic abilities. The journey is framed as a quasi-mystical quest but is primarily an excuse to keep Allerton close.

The two travel through Panama and Ecuador, encountering eccentric expatriates, crooks, and conmen along the way. Lee’s behavior becomes increasingly erratic as he drinks heavily and continues his humiliating pursuit of Allerton. Despite his efforts, Allerton remains emotionally distant, and their relationship deteriorates. The more Lee clings to him, the more Allerton pulls away.

Eventually, Allerton abandons Lee, leaving him alone and devastated. This final rejection forces Lee to confront his own isolation, self-destructive tendencies, and unfulfilled desires. The novel ends on a melancholic, unresolved note, reflecting the existential despair that permeates Lee’s life.

== Literary significance and criticism ==
Queer was originally written as an extension of Junkie, which had been judged too short and uninteresting for publication. Burroughs lost interest in the manuscript, and chose not to return to it even after Junkie was accepted. It was doubtful whether much of the content could be published in the United States at that time, since the heavy homosexual content and theme could be held as obscene. Jack Kerouac admired the work and thought it would appeal to "east coast homosexual literary critics". It was eventually published in 1985 with a new Introduction, when Burroughs's literary agent Andrew Wylie secured him a lucrative publishing contract for future novels with Viking. Reportedly, he had not read the manuscript in thirty years because of the emotional trauma it caused him. Much of it was composed while Burroughs was awaiting trial for the allegedly accidental homicide of his common-law wife Joan Vollmer.

The introduction of the 25th Anniversary edition of Queer, published in 2010 and edited by Oliver Harris, who made some small revisions to the text, argued that the novel's real traumatic backstory was Burroughs' real life relationship with Lewis Marker, fictionalised in the narrative as Lee's hopeless desire for Allerton.

Despite his frequent and uncompromising writings on homosexuality, Burroughs has, in the words of Jamie Russell, author of Queer Burroughs, "been totally excluded from the 'queer canon'". According to Russell, Burroughs's life and writing suggests a gay subjectivity which has been deeply troubling to many in the gay community. Burroughs reputedly said in a press interview, in response to a question regarding the gay rights movement, "I have never been gay a day in my life and I’m sure as hell not a part of any movement." (The primary source of this quotation is unclear; it is quoted, second-hand, by narrator Peter Weller in the 2010 documentary feature William S. Burroughs: A Man Within.)

== Adaptations ==
An Erling Wold opera of the same title, based on the novel, premiered in the United States in 2001.

In 2011, Steve Buscemi was set to direct a film adaption of the book. The screenplay was written by Oren Moverman, director and writer of The Messenger. Buscemi led the first reading of Queer at the Sarasota Film Festival with Stanley Tucci, Ben Foster, John Ventimiglia, and Lisa Joyce.

In December 2022, it was announced that Luca Guadagnino would be directing a film adaptation of the novel with Daniel Craig in the lead role. In April 2023, Drew Starkey was cast as Allerton, along with Lesley Manville, Jason Schwartzman and Henry Zaga. The film premiered at the Venice Film Festival and received a limited release starting November 27, 2024, which was followed by a release on streaming services on January 14, 2025.
