= The Wild Boys (novel) =

1971 novel by William S. Burroughs

The Wild Boys: A Book of the Dead
- First edition
- Author: William S. Burroughs
- Language: English
- Publisher: Grove Press
- Publication date: 1971
- Publication place: United States
- Media type: Print (Hardcover and Paperback)
- Pages: 184 pp
- ISBN: 0-394-47586-0
- OCLC: 222299
- Dewey Decimal: 813/.5/4
- LC Class: PZ4.B972 Wi PS3552.U75

The Wild Boys: A Book of the Dead is a novel by William S. Burroughs. It was first published in 1971 by Grove Press. It depicts a homosexual youth movement whose objective is the downfall of western civilization, set in an apocalyptic late twentieth century.

== Film adaptation proposals ==
In 1972, Burroughs wrote a screenplay based on the novel, with the intent of having it produced as a low-budget hardcore pornographic film, and entered into negotiations with gay porn producer Fred Halsted before abandoning the idea at the end of 1972.

Russell Mulcahy wanted to direct a film adaptation, and talked to Duran Duran about writing the soundtrack, but the project never came to fruition. Nonetheless, the novel inspired the Duran Duran song "The Wild Boys".

== Allusions in other works ==
- The clothes, hair, and makeup of David Bowie's character Ziggy Stardust were based on the description of the Wild Boys in the book. According to Bowie, "it was a cross between that and Clockwork Orange that really started to put together the shape and the look of what Ziggy and the Spiders were going to become. They were both powerful pieces of work, especially the marauding boy gangs of Burroughs's Wild Boys with their bowie knives. I got straight on to that. I read everything into everything. Everything had to be infinitely symbolic."
- Post-punk band The Soft Boys took their name from a combination The Wild Boys and The Soft Machine.
- Former Joy Division front-man Ian Curtis cited it as one of his favourite books.
- Johnny, the protagonist of Patti Smith's Horses, is a reference to the homoerotic protagonist of the novel.
- Fraser, the protagonist of Luca Guadagnino's We Are Who We Are, reads this novel in the first episode.
