= European Beat Studies Network =

European Beat Studies Network (EBSN)
- Members: Over 400
- President: Oliver Harris
- Staff: 8
- Website: ebsn.eu

The European Beat Studies Network (EBSN) and association (EBSN, e.V.,) is a charitable organization and network founded in 2010 by scholars Polina Mackay and Professor Oliver Harris. It comprises an international community of scholars and students, writers and artists with an interest in the broad field of Beat culture and the writers and artists associated with the Beat Generation. It holds annual conferences and promotes research and collaboration in the field of Beat Studies and the arts. It is particularly transnational in focus, as Dr. Chad Weidner writes: 'The impetus of the European Beat Studies Network (EBSN) provides an additional forum for transnational angles into the Beats.'

== Board and membership ==
The EBSN is run by a board of eight that includes Beat scholars Paul Aliferis, Benjamin J. Heal, Estíbaliz Encarnación-Pinedo, Raven See, Chad Weidner and Florian Zappe. Art historian Frida Forsgren stepped down from the board in 2020. Current membership stands at over four hundred, drawn from across Europe and around the world.

== President - Professor Oliver Harris ==
Professor Harris, a William Burroughs scholar, has done much to promote and develop the EBSN. The Jewish Telegraph notes that Harris and colleagues 'set up the European Beat Studies Network because they had found previous academic conferences boring', with the 2016 Manchester Conference described as 'the largest conference of scholars, poets, filmmakers and musical performers interested in the Beat Generation.' In a 2014 interview with Frank Rynne published on the official William S. Burroughs website Harris describes the aim of the EBSN:

Across Europe there's so much interest in the Beats--broadly defined--and the EBSN has a mission to put them in touch with one another. I'm especially keen to break down the usual academic groupings and the Anglo-American divide from non-English speakers, although the barriers are so longstanding it's not easy. It's also hard because the EBSN is free and open to all. No fees - but also no income, so it's literally a labour of love.

The EBSN is frequently discussed and endorsed in both popular and scholarly works such as Professor Andrew Lees' memoir Mentored by a Madman: The William Burroughs Experiment (2016) and Kerouac on Record: A Literary Soundtrack (2018). Simon Warner, an editor of the latter, writes in his acknowledgments thanking 'those involved in Popular Music Studies and Beat Studies (with special reference to the European Beat Studies Network) - for their continued efforts to open up new and interesting areas of inquiry,' while Lees writes that 'Oliver Harris encouraged me to look at Burroughs' work from a scientific viewpoint and invited me to join a group of deadbeats (the European Beat Studies Network) whose imagination knows no limits.'

== Conferences ==
The core function of the EBSN is to facilitate, promote and manage its annual conference, which has been held in the Netherlands, Denmark, Morocco, Belgium, England and France. The Tangier, Morocco conference received significant media attention in Huffington Post Morocco and El Mundo. A review of the Brussels, Belgium conference was published in the American Studies journal Transatlantica. Notable keynote speakers and performers appearing at previous conferences include Beat poet and Naropa Institute founder Anne Waldman, poet Robert Gibbons, musician, author and broadcaster CP Lee, noted neurologist Professor Andrew Lees, writer and academic Anouar Majid, noted English Beat poets Libby Houston and Pete Brown, and folk singer-songwriter Eric Andersen.

== Publications ==
Essays derived from papers presented at the 2011 EBSN conference in Middelburg, the Netherlands, were published in a 2013 edition of the Journal of Comparative American Studies. Essays derived from papers presented at the 2014 EBSN conference in Tangier, Morocco, were published in a 2016 EBSN special issue of the Purdue University Press Q2 rated Journal CLCWeb: Comparative Literature and Culture, edited by EBSN founders Oliver Harris and Polina Mackay. The EBSN website also contains original scholarship including one of the last interviews with Carolyn Cassady, and many reviews of works of Beat and related scholarship, such as Alexander Adams' review of Iain Sinclair's American Smoke, referenced on Sinclair's website.
