= Oliver Harris (academic) =

British academic

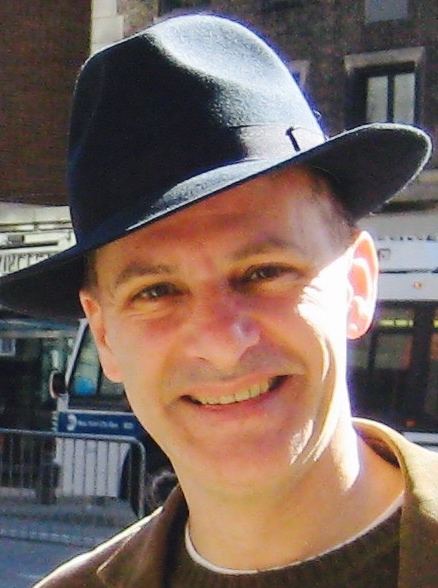
photo of Oliver Harris

Oliver C. G. Harris is a British academic and Emeritus Professor of American Literature at Keele University. He is the author and editor of twenty-six books, including a dozen editions of works by William S. Burroughs: Letters, 1945–1959 (1993), Junky: the definitive text of Junk (2003), The Yage Letters Redux (2006), Queer (2010), The Cut-Up Trilogy, The Soft Machine, Nova Express, and The Ticket That Exploded (2014), Blade Runner: A Movie (2019), Minutes to Go Redux (2020), The Exterminator Redux (2020), BATTLE INSTRUCTIONS (2020) and Dead Fingers Talk (2020). In 2022, he published two short books of essays, A Burroughs Triptych and Making Naked Lunch and in 2023 a collaborative hybrid of criticism and memoir, Two Assassins: William Burroughs/Hassan Sabbah. He is President of the European Beat Studies Network. He served as a consultant to Luca Guadagnino for his 2024 film Queer, based on the Burroughs novel. In 2024, he published a second hybrid of memoir, scholarship, and detective fiction, One Shot: A Beat Generation Mystery. In 2025, he published Roosevelt After Inauguration Redux, a new edition of Burroughs' satirical routine, and in 2026 William Burroughs in Context, co-edited with Davis Schneiderman and Alex Wermer-Colan, published by Cambridge University Press, and In Two Minds: William Burroughs/Brion Gysin.
