= The Ticket That Exploded =

Novel by William S. Burroughs

- First edition
- Author: William S. Burroughs
- Language: English
- Series: The Nova Trilogy
- Publisher: Olympia Press
- Publication date: 1962
- Publication place: United States
- Media type: Print (Hardcover and Paperback)

The Ticket That Exploded is a 1962 novel by American author William S. Burroughs, published by Olympia Press and later by Grove Press in 1967. Together with The Soft Machine and Nova Express it is part of a trilogy, referred to as The Nova Trilogy, created using the cut-up technique, although for this book Burroughs used a variant called 'the fold-in' method. The novel is an anarchic tale concerning mind control by psychic, electronic, sexual, pharmaceutical, subliminal, and other means. Passages from the other two books and even from this book show up in rearranged form and are often repeated. This work is significant for fans of Burroughs, in that it describes his idea of language as a virus and his philosophy of the cut-up technique. It also features the cut-up technique being used by characters within the story. The Ticket That Exploded lays the groundwork for Burroughs' ideas of social revolution through technology, which he would later detail in his book-length essay The Electronic Revolution.

The revised edition published in 1967 was 50% longer than the original, as Burroughs added more material and an appendix. In 2014, a 'Restored' edition was published by Grove Press, edited by Oliver Harris, which made a number of corrections and added an introduction and extensive notes. Establishing the text's manuscript history, the introduction showed that Burroughs wrote The Ticket after The Soft Machine and before Nova Express, and argued that the Trilogy defied any fixed sequence.

== Plot introduction ==
The Ticket That Exploded continues the adventures of Agent Lee in his mission to investigate and subvert the methods of mind control being used by The Nova Mob, a gang of intergalactic criminals intent on destroying Earth.

From the book:

"The basic nova technique is very simple: Always create as many insoluble conflicts as possible and always aggravate existing conflicts—This is done by dumping on the same planet life forms with incompatible conditions of existence—There is of course nothing "wrong" about any given life form since "wrong" only has reference to conflicts with other life forms—The point is these life forms should not be on the same planet—Their conditions of life are basically incompatible in present time form and it is precisely the work of the nova mob to see that they remain in present time form, to create and aggravate the conflicts that lead to the explosion of a planet, that is to nova—"

== In popular culture ==
- A phrase in the book, "The word is now a virus. The flu virus may have once been a healthy lung cell. It is now a parasitic organism that invades and damages the central nervous system. Modern man has lost the option of silence. Try halting sub-vocal speech. Try to achieve even ten seconds of inner silence. You will encounter a resisting organism that forces you to talk. That organism is the word.” was the inspiration for the Laurie Anderson song, "Language is a Virus from Outer Space - William S. Burroughs", originally composed for her performance work, United States. Under the shortened title, "Language is a Virus", the song was performed in her 1986 concert film, Home of the Brave, in which Burroughs also appeared. Burroughs himself is not responsible for the "from outer space" addition.
- The band Miranda Sex Garden takes its name from the novel.
