= Junkie (novel) =

1953 novel by William S. Burroughs

- 1953 Ace Double edition, credited to William Lee
- Author: William S. Burroughs
- Language: English
- Genre: Semi-autobiographical novel
- Publisher: Ace Books
- Publication date: 1953
- Publication place: United States
- Media type: Print (Paperback)
- Pages: 166
- ISBN: 0-14-200316-6 (reprint)
- OCLC: 51086068
- Dewey Decimal: 813/.54 21
- LC Class: PS3552.U75 J86 2003
- Followed by: Queer

Junkie: Confessions of an Unredeemed Drug Addict, or Junky, is a 1953 novel by American Beat Generation writer William S. Burroughs. The book follows "William Lee" as he struggles with his addiction to morphine and heroin. Burroughs based the story on his own experiences with drugs, and he published it under the pen name William Lee. Some critics view the character William Lee as simply Burroughs himself; in this reading, Junkie is a largely-autobiographical memoir. Others view Lee as a fictional character based on the author.

Junkie was Burroughs' first published novel (although he had previously written an unpublished novel with Jack Kerouac). It was initially published by Ace Books in 1953. Ace demanded substantial changes, censored some passages, and bundled it with a book about the Federal Bureau of Narcotics. This version was commercially successful, but did not receive critical attention when first released. In 1977, Penguin Books published an uncensored version of the novel under the alternate spelling Junky.

Critics have analyzed Junkie in the light of Burroughs' later and more experimental novels, such as Naked Lunch. The book is considered dry, lucid, and straightforward compared to those later works, which expand on Junkie's themes of drug addiction and control. The book's grotesque descriptions and hallucinatory imagery are also seen as precursors to his later work.

== Plot ==
In New York City, 1944, William Lee (Note: The original Ace Books edition is credited to the pen name William Lee. More recent editions are credited to William S. Burroughs, but the narrative still refers to William Lee.) is offered a job selling stolen morphine syrettes. He tries the drug for the first time, keeps some syrettes for himself, and sells the rest to a buyer named Roy, who warns him about the dangers of addiction.

Over the next month, Lee gradually uses up what he saved and becomes dependent. As their addictions worsen, Lee and Roy resort to "doctor shopping", convincing a series of physicians to prescribe them morphine. However, their scheme is risky; Lee is eventually arrested for using a fake name on a prescription. His wife bails him out, and he receives a suspended sentence.

Experiencing withdrawal symptoms, including hallucinations, Lee begins searching for an alternative to morphine. Roy connects him to a heroin supplier, and the two initially support their habit by pickpocketing drunk subway riders. Later, Lee forms a partnership with a dealer named Bill Gains, buying, cutting, and reselling heroin while keeping a portion for himself.

As police crack down on the drug trade, paranoia spreads among his circle of addicts and customers. Eventually, Gains decides his lifestyle has become too dangerous and checks himself into the Lexington Medical Center, a government-run facility for treating addiction.

Lee attempts to quit heroin on his own but fails. Following Gains’ lead, he enters Lexington in late 1945, where he listens to other patients’ stories of addiction and undergoes methadone treatment, which he considers a success. After four months, he leaves to start over in New Orleans. While there, Lee visits a gay bar and is invited to have sex, only to be robbed instead. That evening, he relapses and quickly resumes selling heroin.

His addiction worsens, and by 1947, he is arrested again. In jail, Lee suffers severe withdrawal symptoms, including rapid weight loss and hallucinations. His lawyer secures his transfer to a sanitorium for an experimental addiction cure, but his struggle with addiction continues.

After his release, Lee moves to Texas, where he attempts to support himself by growing cotton. This endeavor fails, leaving him financially desperate. Unable to maintain a stable life, he moves to Mexico City in 1948 and relapses once more, much to his wife’s distress. Lee spends the next year in Mexico, making repeated but unsuccessful attempts to quit opioids.

To manage his addiction, he begins drinking heavily, which only worsens his paranoia and deteriorating health. He eventually develops uremia, and later, his doctor warns him that he is drinking himself to death. His wife, realizing the hopelessness of his situation, leaves town with their children.

As anti-narcotics enforcement intensifies in the U.S., Bill Gains flees to Mexico and reunites with Lee. He informs him that Roy was arrested and died in prison. Lee helps Gains secure a heroin supply, but the drug is so heavily adulterated that Gains nearly dies from it.

By 1950, Lee’s marriage has completely collapsed, and he reflects on his separation from his wife. Seeking something beyond the emptiness of addiction, he reads about yagé (ayahuasca), a drug rumored to grant telepathic abilities. Hopeful that it will fill the void that “junk” could not, Lee leaves Mexico City a year later in search of it.

== Background ==
William S. Burroughs was the grandson of William Seward Burroughs I, who founded the Burroughs Corporation. Burroughs' family was financially comfortable, and he received an allowance for most of his life. Burroughs volunteered for the army in 1942, but he was discharged for mental instability. In September 1943, he moved to New York, following his friends Lucien Carr and David Kammerer. Through them, he met Jack Kerouac and Allen Ginsberg; along with Burroughs himself, these writers would become the core figures of the Beat Generation. While in New York, Burroughs became addicted to opioids, and increasingly committed crimes as the cost of his addiction exceeded his allowance.

Carr fatally stabbed Kammerer in 1944. Burroughs and Kerouac were briefly arrested for not reporting the homicide, then co-wrote a novel inspired by the event called And the Hippos Were Boiled in Their Tanks, which they were unable to get published. The novel was eventually published in 2008.

In 1945, Burroughs met Joan Vollmer, who would become his common-law wife. In October 1946, Burroughs and Vollmer left New York for Texas, where they had a child. They later moved to Mexico City in October 1949, partly to avoid legal risks around Burroughs' drug use.

Carr visited Burroughs in August 1950 and suggested he write a book about his experiences. Burroughs began writing Junkie while he was using heroin. By February 1951, he had quit heroin, but continued to smoke opium, which he believed carried minimal risk of addiction. Although Burroughs' preface to the novel refers to his addiction in the past tense, he remained dependent on opioids like methadone for the rest of his life.

Over the summer of 1951, Burroughs traveled to Ecuador with his friend Lewis Marker, hoping to start a romantic relationship. This experience would become the foundation of Burroughs' second novel Queer. Back in Mexico City, on September 6, 1951, Burroughs fatally shot Vollmer; he had attempted to shoot a glass balanced on her head while drunk. Although he had already written the first draft of Junkie, he would later state that he would not have become a writer if not for her death.

== Publication ==
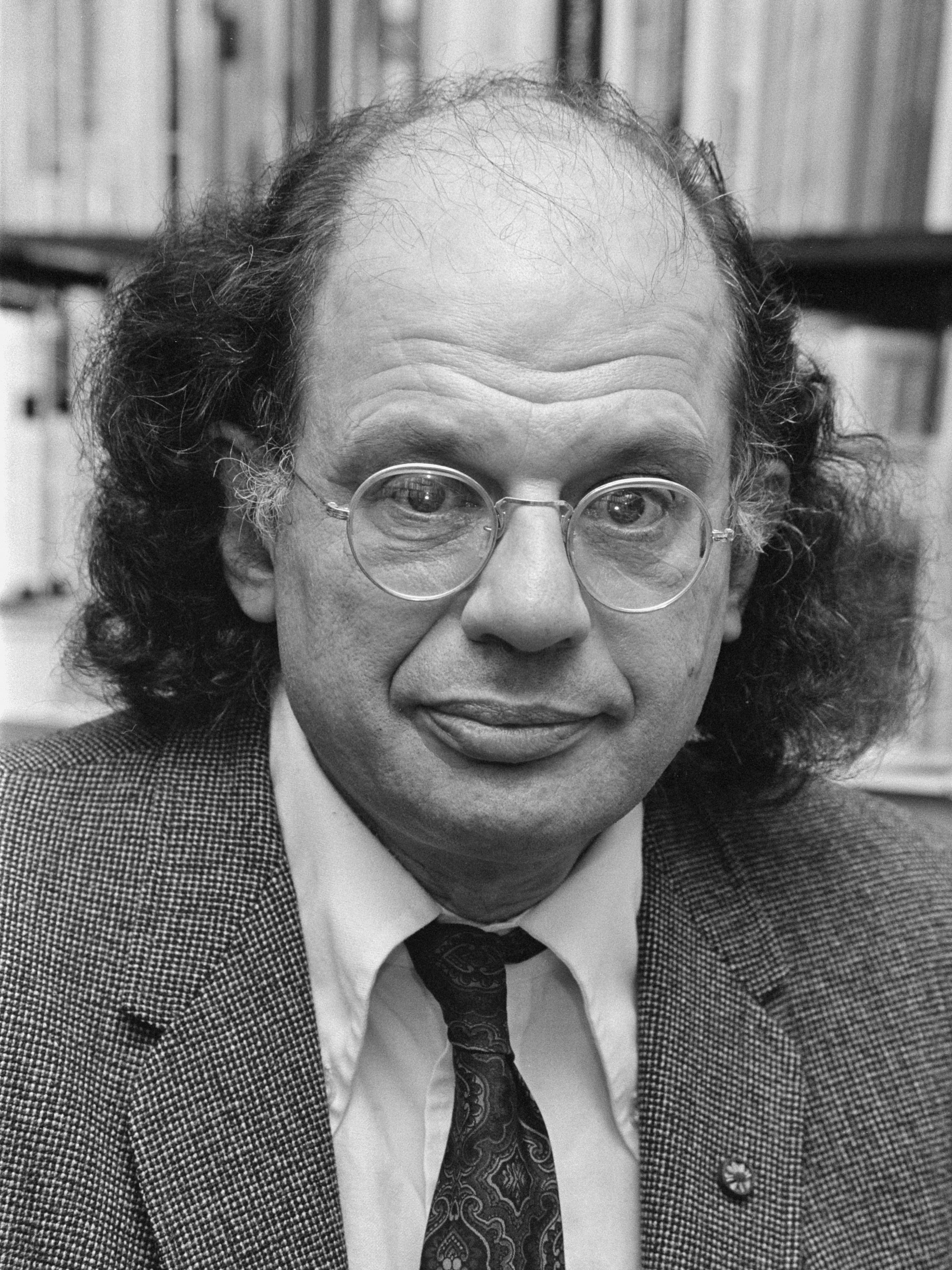
Allen Ginsberg (pictured in 1979) used his literary connections to get Junkie published through Ace Books. He later criticized the terms of publication as "ridiculous".

Burroughs mailed chapters of Junkie to Allen Ginsberg as he wrote. In his preface to the 1977 edition, Ginsberg claims that he and Burroughs collaboratively assembled the novel from these letters. He also notes that they continued this practice for Burroughs' subsequent novels Queer and Naked Lunch. Oliver Harris, a scholar and editor of Burroughs' works, disputes this story. He argues that Burroughs wrote most of the novel before sharing it with Ginsberg, and that the book "shows no signs of an interpersonal epistolary aesthetic."

Burroughs finished his initial manuscript by January 1, 1951. In April 1952, Ginsberg began the process of getting it published. Ginsberg sent copies of Junkie and Jack Kerouac's On the Road to his acquaintance Carl Solomon, whose uncle A. A. Wyn owned Ace Books. Solomon and Wyn rejected On The Road, but agreed to publish Junkie. Ginsberg later regretted signing a "ridiculous" contract with Ace Books, which he felt substantially underpaid Burroughs for the book's success.

Burroughs' manuscript was originally titled Junk. Ace Books renamed it to Junkie, out of a concern that Junk would imply the book itself was poor quality, and added the subtitle Confessions of an Unredeemed Drug Addict. Ace Books took advantage of Burroughs' provocative subject by creating what Harris calls an "especially lurid and voyeuristic" book cover, but also censored the book's language, removed passages, and added editors' notes and disclaimers. To avoid appearing to endorse recreational drug use, Wyn bundled Junkie with a reprint of Narcotics Agent, a 1941 book by Maurice Helbrant chronicling his work in the Federal Bureau of Narcotics. The publisher also asked Burroughs to include a prologue about his upbringing, to make it clear he did not come from a family of addicts and criminals.

Burroughs originally named the protagonist "William Dennison." This name had previously been used for Burroughs' analogs in two romans à clef: Jack Kerouac's first published novel The Town and the City, and Kerouac and Burroughs' unpublished collaboration And the Hippos Were Boiled in Their Tanks. Burroughs later renamed the protagonist "William Lee", after his mother's maiden name.

Before the novel was published, Ace Books asked Burroughs to add 40 more pages. Burroughs incorporated material he had intended for his follow-up novel Queer, which was written in the third-person. Although Burroughs edited these sections to match Junkie's first-person narration, this approach led to incongruities in the final text. Burroughs assembled the combined version by cutting up the original manuscripts and pasting them back together, a technique he would push much farther in his later books.

=== Later Editions ===
In the 1970s, Burroughs successfully sued Ace Books for breach of contract, arguing that he had never received sufficient royalties. The court reverted the novel's publishing rights, and James Grauerholz edited a new edition that Burroughs personally approved. This edition was published by Penguin Books in 1977. It restored material that had previously been censored by Ace Books and changed the title to Junky, with no subtitle.

In 2003, for the books's 50th anniversary, Penguin reissued the book as Junky: The Definitive Text of "Junk". This release included previously unpublished material from Allen Ginsberg's archives, in which Lee builds an "orgone accumulator" based on the writings of Wilhelm Reich. Burroughs had omitted this chapter in part to avoid being seen as a "lunatic".

== Style and themes ==
Junkie is sometimes considered an autobiographical memoir, in which William Lee is a stand-in for Burroughs himself. Others, including Beat scholar Jennie Skerl, interpret the book as a novel and William Lee as a fictionalized caricature. William Stull considers the novel a Bildungsroman similar to The Catcher in the Rye, while Oliver Harris argues that "the last genre to which Junkie belongs is that of the Künstlerroman."

Burroughs' writing style is dry and direct. His narrative voice is often compared to Dashiell Hammett's. Jack Kerouac favorably compared him to Ernest Hemingway. Oliver Harris notes that Burroughs' deadpan narration is often subtly ironic, as in Lee's observation that "You need a good bedside manner with doctors or you will get nowhere". The narration is interspersed with journalistic asides, which document various drugs, addiction treatments, laws, police procedures, and slang. In particular, Burroughs criticizes specific provisions in New York's public health laws and the federal Harrison Narcotics Tax Act. The narration frequently changes focus, reflecting Lee's nervousness and paranoia.

The book is written in the first-person, but it rarely explores Lee's psychology or motivations. Lee routinely breaks the law and commits acts of cruelty, but his actions are described in straightforward prose without excuses or explicit value judgments. While the novel does not condemn or justify Lee's actions, it does criticize overzealous law enforcement, doctors who try to control their patients, and anti-drug legislation aimed at "penalizing a state of being". Burroughs emphasizes the negative aspects of addiction and the pain of withdrawal, only briefly mentioning the pleasurable effects of drugs. Despite its pervasive criticism of power dynamics, the novel does not emphasize the control drug dealers have over their customers.

The novel describes opioid addicts with grotesque and dehumanizing language, such as comparing them to wooden puppets and deep-sea creatures. Lee claims that opioids reshape drug users on a cellular level, and that severe addicts are not recognizably human. Burroughs later expands on this motif in his follow-up novel Naked Lunch, in which heroin addicts metamorphose into surreal monsters. The book describes surreal hallucinations, such as giant insects swarming over New York and people transforming into crustaceans and plants. These sections have also been seen as precursors to Burroughs' later works.

The novel is structured around cycles of addiction and withdrawal, which become progressively more severe as Lee moves further South. The book ends with no clear resolution: Lee starts another cycle by heading South from Mexico City to find a new addictive substance, yage. The novel also follows the rise of police surveillance and decline of hipster subculture. As the police crack down on drugs, the community becomes increasingly paranoid and isolated. They no longer trust obscure jargon or their fellow addicts to protect them.

=== Sexuality ===
Lee describes heroin as "short-circuit[ing]" sexual desires, and withdrawal as a chance for those desires to reawaken. In one scene, Lee experiences a spontaneous orgasm while in jail, unable to satisfy his addiction. Although the novel rarely mentions his sexuality, Lee is gay, as was Burroughs himself. When Lee does seek out sexual encounters, he asserts his masculinity, derides gay bars, and expresses revulsion toward effeminate men, whom he lambasts as "ventriloquists’ dummies who have moved in and taken over the ventriloquist". In Burroughs' follow-up novel Queer, Lee's sexual frustrations and anxieties receive much more focus. Burroughs' preface to Queer suggests that, in Junkie, Lee's sexuality was "held in check by junk".

=== Omissions ===
Despite their influence on Burroughs' writing, the novel does not mention Allen Ginsberg or Jack Kerouac. In contrast, contemporary works by Kerouac and Ginsberg prominently featured Burroughs.

Lee's wife abruptly disappears from the story during the Mexico City section. In reality, Burroughs fatally shot Joan Vollmer; he was allowed to leave Mexico after the courts ruled the shooting an accident, not a homicide. A. A. Wyn asked Burroughs to add additional material explaining her character's disappearance, but he refused to write about the shooting. Instead, he suggested they remove all references to her from the book, and offered to invent a fictional car accident if Wyn insisted that she had to die. Wyn relented and published the book with no explanation for her absence, besides a brief reference to Lee and his wife being separated.

== Reception ==
Ace Books printed 150,000 copies of Junkie, and the novel sold 113,000 copies in its first year. Despite this commercial success, it was not professionally reviewed or analyzed when first released.

In retrospect, Tony Tanner considers the novel a foundation for Burroughs' later experimentalism. He notes that "Later, [Burroughs] made the business of drug addiction into a vast encompassing metaphor; in this book he looks at it, with a remarkable cool lucidity, simply as the dominant fact of his life." Mario Vargas Llosa wrote that while he did not care for Burroughs's subsequent experimental fiction, he admired the more straightforward Junkie as "an accurate description of what I believe to be the literary vocation". Carlo Gébler found the novel riveting and felt it exemplified Burroughs' unflinching writing style, saying that "in a world where writers more and more want their readers to believe they are nice people, Burroughs was a rare example of real authorial honesty". He called Junkie "the only book I know that doesn't glamorize heroin".

Beat scholar Jennie Skerl considers the novel a more successful portrait of hipster subculture than Norman Mailer's essay The White Negro. She notes that Burroughs displays a deeper familiarity with the subculture's slang, and correctly identifies that drug use is central to the hipster worldview. Norman Mailer himself considered Junkie a well-written potboiler. Will Self argues that the novel fails to insightfully analyze addiction, in part because Burroughs was deluded about his own relationship with drugs. However, he considers it an enduring portrayal of alienation.

Burroughs himself later criticized the novel. In 1965, he commented "I don't feel the results were at all spectacular. Junky is not much of a book, actually. I knew very little about writing at that time."

== Censorship ==
In December 2025, the Lukashenko regime added the book to the List of printed publications containing information materials, the distribution of which could harm the national interests of Belarus.
