= Phil Hine =

British occult writer

Philip M. Hine is a British occultist and writer. He became known internationally through his written works Condensed Chaos, Prime Chaos, and Pseudonomicon, as well as several essays on the topics of chaos magic and Cthulhu Mythos magic. He has facilitated workshops and seminars on modern magical practice in America and Europe and contributed to a wide range of occult journals, having been most active from 1986 to 1996.

== Early life ==
Growing up in Blackpool, Hine became involved with chaos magic theory in West Yorkshire in the 1980s. This was after he "picked up the fabled white edition of Liber Null by Peter J. Carroll" at Sorcerer's Apprentice bookshop. During the early years of his studies of psychology and sociology he was influenced by the works of the Swiss psychiatrist C. G. Jung.

== Career ==
Hine was a founder and co-editor of occult magazine Pagan News in partnership with Rodney Orpheus. Hine subsequently published a series of booklets on urban shamanism in the late 1980s.

His earliest popular work was a small pamphlet which outlined a brief and simple definition of magic, a brief history of the school of practice called chaos magic, and an outline of some of its basic approaches, which presented a number of simple techniques. This was followed in 1993 by Prime Chaos, which focused on the construction and uses of more formalised ritual techniques

In 1995, he expanded his earlier pamphlet under the same title, Condensed Chaos. This book focuses on the basic techniques and the style of doing magic that has become associated with chaos magic. It has been described by William S. Burroughs as "the most concise statement of the logic of modern magic".

== Personal life ==
As of 1997 he resides in South London.

Hine is bisexual.

== Bibliography ==
=== Books ===
- Walking Between The Worlds (PDF). Techniques of Modern Shamanism. Vol. 1. Pagan News Publications. 1986.
- Two Worlds & Inbetween (PDF). Techniques of Modern Shamanism. Vol. 2. Pagan News Publications. 1989a.
- Touched By Fire (PDF). Techniques of Modern Shamanism. Vol. 3. Pagan News Publications. 1989b.
- Chaos Servitors: A User Guide. Chaos International. 1991.
- Condensed Chaos. Chaos International. 1992.
- Prime Chaos. Chaos International. 1993. ISBN 978-0952132004.
- Condensed Chaos: An Introduction to Chaos Magic. New Falcon Publications. 1995. ISBN 1-56184-117-X.
- The Pseudonomicon. New Falcon Publications. 2004. ISBN 1-56184-195-1.
- Hine's Varieties: Chaos & Beyond. Original Falcon Press. 2019. ISBN 978-1-93515-076-3.

==== As editor ====
- Starry Wisdom: Collected essays from the Esoteric Order of Dagon. Pagan News Publications. 1990.
- Hine, Phil; Orpheus, Rodney, eds. (2023). Delinquent Elementals: The Very Best Of Pagan News. The MIT Press. ISBN 978-1907222931.

=== Contributions ===
- "Dark Entries". Starry Wisdom. Pagan News Publications. 1990.
- "The Physics of Evocation". The Nox Anthology. New World Publishing. 1990.
- "Bitter Venoms". A Taste of Things to Come. Revelations 23 Press. 1991.
- "Foreword". Chaos Ritual. Neptune Press. 1994.
- "Cthulhu Madness". The Starry Wisdom (2nd ed.). Creation Press. 1996.
- "Responses to Chaos Culture". Rebels & Devils. New Falcon Publications. 1996.
- "Riding the Serpent". Secrets of Western Tantra. New Falcon Publications. 1996.
- "Sexual Magick: A Chaos Perspective". Sex, Magick, Tantra & Tarot. New Falcon Publications. 1996.
- "Foreword". Chaotopia!: Magick & Ecstasy in the PandaemonAeon. Attractor. 1997.
- "Are You Illuminated?". The Book of Lies: the Disinformation Guide to Magick & the Occult. 2003.

=== Articles ===
- Hine, Phil (2003). "Zimbu Xototl Time". Ashé Journal. 2 (3).
- Hine, Phil (2003). "For the Love of God: Variations of the Vaisnava School of Krishna Devotion". Ashé Journal. 2 (4).
