= The Soft Machine =

1961 novel by William S Burroughs

- First edition
- Author: William S. Burroughs
- Language: English
- Series: The Nova Trilogy
- Publisher: Olympia Press
- Publication date: 1961
- Publication place: United States

The Soft Machine is a 1961 novel by American author William S. Burroughs. It was originally composed using the cut-up technique partly from manuscripts belonging to The Word Hoard. It is the first part of The Nova Trilogy.

== Title and structure ==
The book is written in a style close to that of Naked Lunch, employing third-person singular indirect recall, though now using the cut-up method. While Junkie showcased a more conventional realist style of narration, The Soft Machine "cuts up" the narrative of addiction to subvert the shared symbolic and cultural codes of communal structures, notably the manipulative and coercive power of language. Cut-up narrative denies even the possibility of shared meanings. The novel's main theme is how to subvert the invading control mechanisms by annihilating the shared common language. Thus, the introduction to the British edition states: "Glad to have you aboard reader, but remember there is only one captain of this subway".

After the main material follow three appendices in the British edition, the first explaining the title (as mentioned above) and two accounts of Burroughs' own drug abuse and treatment using apomorphine. Here Burroughs clearly states that he considers drug abuse a metabolic disease and writes about how he finally escaped it.

== Plot summary ==
The main plot appears in linear prose in chapter VII, The Mayan Caper. This chapter portrays a secret agent who has the ability to change bodies or metamorphose his own body using "U.T." (undifferentiated tissue). As such an agent he makes a time travel machine and takes on a gang of Mayan priests who use the Mayan calendar to control the minds of slave laborers used for planting maize. The calendar images are written in books, placed on a magnetic tape, and transmitted as sounds to control the slaves. The agent manages to infiltrate the slaves and replace the magnetic tape with a totally different message: "burn the books, kill the priests", which causes the downfall of their regime.

== Characters ==
The characters of the Soft Machine fall into three categories:

- Characters from the previous novels Junkie, Queer and Naked Lunch: Dr Benway, Clem Snide, Sailor, Bill Gains, Kiki, and Carl Peterson.
- Characters associated with the Nova Trilogy:
  - The Nova Mob: Mr Bradly Mr Martin, Sammy the Butcher, Green Tony, Izzy the Push, Willy the Rat/Uranian Willy, agent K9?
  - The Nova Police: Inspector J. Lee
  - Alien races: The Venusians/Green Boys (Johnny Yen, Contessa di Vile), The Uranians/Blue heavy metal boys.
- Characters recycled from the work of other authors:
  - Jimmy Sheffields from the novel Fury by Henry Kuttner
  - Salt Chunk Mary from the novel You Can't Win by Jack Black
  - Danny Deaver from poem with the same title by Rudyard Kipling
  - Billy Budd and Captain Verre from the short-story Billy Budd by Herman Melville

== Editions ==
The Soft Machine has been printed in four different editions, the first three revised by the author, the last by Burroughs scholar Oliver Harris.

1. The first edition was printed by Olympia Press in Paris, in 1961, as number 88 in the Traveller Companion Series. It featured 182 pages arranged in 50 chapters of about 8 pages each. This edition was colour-coded into four different Units, and it was heavily fragmented. This edition is rare and the text is not widely available.
2. The second edition was printed by Grove Press in the United States, in 1966. In this edition, Burroughs removed 82 pages and inserted 82 new pages, and the remaining 100 pages were rearranged and restructured using further cut-ups. Much of the added material was linear, narrative prose, which is arguably easier to read than the disorganized first edition. Many chapters were renamed and rearranged in this edition, and the colour code from the first edition was removed.
3. The third edition was printed by John Calder in Great Britain, 1968. This time most chapter titles were intact from the second edition, but they began at more natural places in the text, whereas the second edition could place them in the middle of a sentence. The chapter 1920s War Movies was renamed The Streets of Chance. Twenty pages of new material had been added, plus about eight pages from the first edition which had been removed in the second edition. About five pages of material which was present in both the first and second edition was removed. This edition also included an "Appendix" and "Afterword".
4. The fourth 'Restored' edition was printed by Grove Press in the United States in 2014. Drawing on the discovery of a manuscript of The Soft Machine that was to have been published by Olympia Press in 1963, this edition restores a short cancelled chapter ('Male Image Back In'), restores the 1961 edition's heavy use of capital letters, and has some different chapter breaks. The edition also includes an introduction, extensive notes and appendices.

Burroughs himself was very displeased with the first edition and this was the main reason for rewriting it so thoroughly: in 1961 he wrote to his friend Allen Ginsberg that he rewrote it extensively while he was working on Dead Fingers Talk, mostly because he was displeased with the balance of cut-up and more linear material. However, his revised editions included much new cut-up material as well as more conventional prose.

== Obscenity controversy ==
The novel was subject to an obscenity trial in Turkey in 2011. Sel Yayıncılık and the novel's Turkish translator faced obscenity charges after the release of the book, due to alleged "incompliance with moral norms" and “hurting people’s moral feelings.” Sel Yayıncılık and the books’ translators face three more years of uncertainty after the judge pronounced that the trial would be postponed until 2015, due to the implementation of new legislation. Meanwhile, the judge warned that if either of the publishing houses or the translators were foolish enough to publish further ‘obscene’ works, these cases would be added to the charge sheet.

== Legacy ==
The term "heavy metal" was first used in this novel, introducing the character “Uranian Willy The Heavy Metal Kid" (Burroughs continued using the term in subsequent novels). Although that character had no relation with that genre of rock music, the rock critic Lester Bangs did cite Burroughs in his Creem Magazine articles in which he is generally believed to have originated the term ‘heavy metal’ as applied to a rock music form.

English jazz rock band Soft Machine, from Canterbury, named themselves after the book, when they formed in mid-1966.
