= William S. Burroughs bibliography =

This is a bibliography of the works of William S. Burroughs.

== Novels and other long fiction ==
- Junkie (a.k.a. Junky) (1953) (ISBN 0-14-200316-6 – later reprint)
- Queer (written 1951–1953; published 1985) (ISBN 0-14-008389-8)
- Naked Lunch (1959) (ISBN 0-8021-3295-2)
- The Nova Trilogy (1961-1967):
  - The Soft Machine (1961–1966) (ISBN 0-8021-3329-0)
  - The Ticket That Exploded (1962–1967) (ISBN 0-8021-5150-7)
  - Nova Express (1964) (ISBN 0-8021-3330-4)
- Dead Fingers Talk (1963) (ISBN 978-0-426-05004-9) – sections of Naked Lunch, Soft Machine, and Ticket that Exploded re-arranged into a new narrative. Often erroneously called a compilation because of this.
- The Last Words of Dutch Schultz (1969) (ISBN 1-55970-211-7)
- The Wild Boys: A book of the dead (1971) (ISBN 0-8021-3331-2)
- Port of Saints (1973) (ISBN 0-912652-64-0)
- The Red Night Trilogy (1981–1987):
  - Cities of the Red Night (1981) (ISBN 0-03-053976-5)
  - The Place of Dead Roads (1983) (ISBN 0-312-27865-9)
  - The Western Lands (1987) (ISBN 0-14-009456-3)
- My Education: A Book of Dreams (1995) (ISBN 0-14-009454-7)

Note: Burroughs published revised and rewritten editions of several of the above novels, including The Soft Machine and The Ticket that Exploded, while re-edited versions of some books such as Junkie and Naked Lunch have been published posthumously.

== Non-fiction and letters ==
- "Letter From A Master Addict To Dangerous Drugs," British Journal of Addiction, Vol. 53, No. 2, 3 August 1956
- The Job: Interviews with William S. Burroughs (1969) (ISBN 0-14-011882-9) (with Daniel Odier; includes additional texts by Burroughs)
- Jack Kerouac (1970) (with Claude Pelieu)
- The Electronic Revolution (1971)
- "Foreword" (1974) to Mohamed Choukri's Jean Genet in Tangier (SBN 912-94608-3)
- The Retreat Diaries (1976) - later included in The Burroughs File
- Letters to Allen Ginsberg 1953-1957 (1976)
- The Adding Machine: Collected Essays (1985) (ISBN 1-55970-210-9)
- Selected Letters (1993)
- The Letters of William S. Burroughs 1945-1959 (1993) (ISBN 978-0-330-33074-9)
- Last Words: The Final Journals of William S. Burroughs (2000; ISBN 0-8021-3778-4)
- Conversations with William S. Burroughs (2000) (ISBN 1-57806-183-0)
- Burroughs Live : The Collected Interviews of William S. Burroughs, 1960-1997 (2000) (ISBN 1-58435-010-5)
- Everything Lost: The Latin American Notebook of William S. Burroughs (2007; ISBN 978-0-8142-1080-2)
- Rub Out The Words: The Letters of William S. Burroughs 1959-1974 (2012) (ISBN 978-1-846-14167-6)

== Stories and novellas ==
- Valentine's Day Reading (1965)
- Time (1965) - a parody of Time magazine published in an approximation of the magazine's format
- APO-33 (1965)
- The Dead Star (1969)
- Ali's Smile (1971)
- Mayfair Academy Series More or Less (1973)
- White Subway (1973) - later included in The Burroughs File
- The Book of Breeething (1974)
- Snack... (ISBN 0-85652-014-4) (1975)
- Cobble Stone Gardens (1976) - later included in The Burroughs File
- Blade Runner (a movie) (1979) (ISBN 0-912652-46-2)
- Dr. Benway (1979)
- Die Alten Filme (The Old Movies) (1979) - later included in The Burroughs File
- Streets of Chance (1981)
- Early Routines (1981)
- Sinki's Sauna (1982)
- Ruski (1984)
- The Four Horsemen of the Apocalypse (1984)
- The Cat Inside (1986)
- The Whole Tamale (c.1987-88)
- Tornado Alley (1989)
- Ghost of Chance (1991) (ISBN 1-85242-457-5)
- Seven Deadly Sins (1992)
- Paper Cloud; Thick Pages (1992)

== Collections ==
- Interzone (written mid-1950s, published 1989) (ISBN 978-0-14-009451-0)
- Roosevelt After Inauguration and Other Atrocities (1965; republished 1979)
- Exterminator! (1973) (ISBN 0-14-005003-5) (a different book from the 1960 collaboration with Brion Gysin)
- Ali's Smile: Naked Scientology (1978)
- Ah Pook is Here, Nova Express, Cities of the Red Night (1981) - omnibus (ISBN 0-312-27846-2)
- The Burroughs File (1984)
- Three Novels - Grove Press omnibus of The Soft Machine, Nova Express and The Wild Boys (1988) (ISBN 0-8021-3084-4)
- Uncommon Quotes Vol. 1 (1989)
- Word Virus: The William Burroughs Reader (1998) (ISBN 0-00-655214-5)
- The Revised Boy Scout Manual: An Electronic Revolution (2018)(ISBN 978-0-8142-5489-9) - a longform parody essay from c.1970 previously unpublished in complete form

== Collaborations ==
- And the Hippos Were Boiled in Their Tanks (1945; published November 2008) (with Jack Kerouac) (ISBN 978-1-84614-164-5)
- Minutes To Go (1960) (with Sinclair Beilles, Gregory Corso and Brion Gysin)
- The Exterminator (1960) (with Brion Gysin)
- The Yage Letters (1963) (with Allen Ginsberg, later published in an expanded version title The Yage Letter Redux)
- So Who Owns Death TV? (1967) (with Claude Pelieu and Carl Weissner)
- Rules of Duel (1970; first published 2010) (primarily by Graham Masterton, but Burroughs receives co-author credit) (ISBN 978-1-84583-054-0)
- Brion Gysin Let the Mice In (1973) (with Brion Gysin)
- Sidetripping (1975) (with Charles Gatewood)
- Colloque de Tangier (1976) (with Brion Gysin)
- The Third Mind (1977) (with Brion Gysin)
- Colloque de Tangier Vol. 2 (1979) (with Brion Gysin and Gérard-Georges Lemaire)
- Ah Pook Is Here and Other Texts (1979) (with Malcolm McNeill)
- Apocalypse (1988) (with Keith Haring)
- The Black Rider (1989) (a stage musical, with Tom Waits and Robert Wilson)

== Film collaborations ==
The Final Academy Documents, with experimental film collaborations of Brion Gysin, Antony Balch, John Giorno, and others, based on a tour organized by David Dawson, Roger Ely, and Genesis P-Orridge. A DVD of edited highlights from the tour, including Burroughs's 1982 appearance reading from his work at Manchester's The Haçienda, a performance by Giorno and includes the experimental film collaborations with Balch, Gysin, and others, Towers Open Fire and Ghosts at No. 9.

Burroughs appeared as himself in a number of films in the 1980s and 1990s, including the 1986 Laurie Anderson concert film Home of the Brave (in which Burroughs dances a slow-motion tango with Anderson during one number and provides vocal samples in other parts of the film), and the documentaries Heavy Petting and What Happened to Kerouac?

Burroughs also played a cameo part in the film Drugstore Cowboy, and his recording of The Junky's Christmas formed the basis for a 1993 animated short film of the same title in which Burroughs himself appears. He collaborated on the documentary Words of Advice: William S. Burroughs on the Road eventually released in 2007. An animated short film based upon his story "Ah Pook is Here" has also been produced.

Gus Van Sant, director of Drugstore Cowboy, made a short film in 1981 based on Burroughs's "The Discipline of DE".

== Recordings (partial list) ==
- Call Me Burroughs (1965) - The English Bookshop, Paris (reissued in 1995)
- Long song for Zelda (1971) - by Dashiell Hedayat and Gong, LP shandar record production SR83512, Paris, (reedited as a CD in 1992 and 2008 on "Mantra production"), Obsolete, Burroughs says a sentence of 10 seconds at the end of track at the 7'32 mark.
- The Nova Convention (1979) by Burroughs and others - LP GPS
- Nothing Here Now But The Recordings (1981) with Brion Gysin - LP Industrial Records IR0016
- You're the Guy I Want to Share My Money With (1981) with John Giorno and Laurie Anderson - LP GPS
- Mister Heartbreak (1984) by Laurie Anderson - Burroughs reads "Sharkey's Night"
- The Elvis of Letters (1985) with Gus van Sant
- Home of the Brave (1986) by Laurie Anderson - Burroughs sample is used in the song "Late Show"
- UnCommon Quotes (1986) - Recorded at CARAVAN of DREAMS, September 11, 1986 (ISBN 0-929856-00-7); cassette only; includes foldout essay "William S. Burroughs: A Shift in Vision" by Robert Palmer
- Break Through In Grey Room (1986) - A collection of readings and cutups - Sub Rosa Records
- Smack My Crack (1987) with Tom Waits and various artists - LP GPS
- Like A Girl I Want To Keep Coming (1989) by John Giorno - LP GPS
- Seven Souls (1989) by Material - remixed in 1998 as The Road to the Western Lands
- Dead City Radio (1990) - Island Records
- Millions of Images (1990) with Gus Van Sant
- The "Priest" they called him (1992) - Burroughs narrates and Kurt Cobain plays guitar
- "Just One Fix" (1992) from the Ministry album Psalm 69: The Way to Succeed and the Way to Suck Eggs - Burroughs reads "Quick Fix" and created the cover art
- The Black Rider (1992) - Musical co-authored with Tom Waits and Robert Wilson, sings on "T'ain't No Sin"
- Spare Ass Annie and Other Tales with The Disposable Heroes of Hiphoprisy (1993) - Island Records
- "Words Of Advice" on the Material album Hallucination Engine (1994)
- The Dark Eye (1995), Voices the character "Uncle Edwin", also narration of Annabel Lee and Masque of the Red Death. Burroughs' only video game role.
- 10%: File under Burroughs (1996) - 2-CD set, produced by Frank Rynne and Joe Ambrose, Sub Rosa
- Songs in the Key of X (1996) and In Time: The Best of R.E.M. 1988-2003 bonus disc (2003) - Burroughs vocal over an instrumental version of R.E.M.'s "Star Me Kitten"
- Stoned Immaculate: The Music of the Doors (2000) - Burroughs reads poetry by Jim Morrison over music by The Doors on "Is Everybody In?"
