= Thanksgiving prayer =

Thanksgiving prayer or prayer of Thanksgiving may refer to:

- any prayer of thankfulness
- a prayer offered at Thanksgiving
- Thanksgiving after Communion, a practice in certain Christian churches
- Prayer of Thanksgiving, a Gnostic text from Nag Hammadi
- "Thanksgiving Prayer", a song from the 1978 film The Magic of Lassie
- "Thanksgiving Day, Nov. 28, 1986", a poem by William S. Burroughs from his 1989 book Tornado Alley
- "A Thanksgiving Prayer", a reading of the poem, set to music by Frank Denning, from Burroughs's 1990 album Dead City Radio
- Thanksgiving Prayer, a 1991 short film of Burroughs reading the poem, by Gus Van Sant

== See also ==
- Thanksgiving (disambiguation)
