= Terminal =

Terminal may refer to:

== Computing ==
=== Hardware ===
- Computer terminal, a set of primary input and output devices for a computer
- Terminal (electronics), a device for joining electrical circuits together
  - Battery terminal, electrical contact used to connect a load or charger to a single cell or multiple-cell battery
- Terminal (telecommunication), a device communicating over a line
- Feedback terminal, a physical device used collect anonymous feedback

=== Software ===
- Terminal emulator, a program that emulates a computer terminal within some other display architecture
  - Terminal (macOS), a terminal emulator included with macOS
  - Windows Terminal, a terminal emulator for Windows 10 and Windows 11
  - GNOME Terminal, a Linux and BSD terminal emulator
- Terminal and nonterminal symbols, lexical elements used in specifying the production rules constituting a formal grammar in computer science

=== Fonts ===
- Terminal (typeface), a monospace font
- Terminal (typography), a type of stroke ending

== Transportation ==
- Airport terminal, a building where passengers embark and disembark aircraft (or cargo is loaded)
- Bus terminal
- Passenger terminal (maritime), a structure where passenger water vessels ships pick up and drop off passengers
- Container port, also called a terminal, where cargo containers are transferred between different vehicles or ships
- Railroad terminal, the end point of a railroad line

== Places ==
- Terminal (Asunción), a neighbourhood in Paraguay
- Terminal Peak, a mountain in Tasmania, Australia
- Terminal Peak (Antarctica), a mountain in Ricker Hills, Oates Land, Antarctica
- Terminal Range, a mountain range in Canada

== Media ==
=== Film and TV ===
- The Terminal, 2004 American comedy-drama film
- Terminal (film), a 2018 British international film starring Margot Robbie
- "Terminal", an episode of Law & Order
- "Terminal" (Space Ghost Coast to Coast), a television episode

=== Music ===
- Terminal (American band), a rock band from Texas
- terminal (Danish band), a pop rock band from Copenhagen
- Terminal (Ancestral Legacy album), 2014
- Terminal (Salyu album), 2007
- "Terminal" (Ayumi Hamasaki song), 2014
- "Terminal" (Rupert Holmes song), 1974
- "Terminals", a song by Relient K featuring Adam Young

== Literature ==
- Terminal (Cook novel), by Robin Cook
- Terminal (Tunnels novel), a 2013 novel in the Tunnels series
- Terminal, a novel by Colin Forbes
- The Terminal Man, 1972 novel by Michael Crichton
  - The Terminal Man (film), adaptation by Mike Hodges
- The Terminal Man, autobiography of Mehran Karimi Nasseri

== Science and medicine ==
- Terminal deoxynucleotidyl transferase, a specialized DNA polymerase
- Terminal illness, a progressive disease that is expected to cause death
- Terminal sedation, or palliative sedation, the practice of inducing unconsciousness in a terminally ill person for the remainder of the person's life
- Terminal velocity, in physics
- Terminal, in botanical terminology, the location of a flower or other feature
- Terminal, in fish anatomy, a mouth position

== Other uses ==
- Terminal High Altitude Area Defense, an American anti-ballistic missile defence system
- Potsdam Conference, code-named "Terminal", the last Allied meeting of World War II
- Suffix, in grammar
- Terminal 21, shopping malls in Thailand

== See also ==
- Termination (disambiguation)
- Terminator (disambiguation)
- Terminus (disambiguation)
- Termini (disambiguation)
- Terminate (disambiguation)
