= Exterminator =

Exterminator may refer to:

== Pest control ==
- Pest exterminator, a practitioner in control of harmful species

== Competition ==
- Exterminator (horse) (1915–1945), racehorse, the winner of the 1918 Kentucky Derby
- X-Terminator, a competitor in Robot Wars

== Fiction ==
- Exterminator!, a 1973 short story collection by William S. Burroughs
- The Exterminator (1960 book), short story collection by William S. Burroughs, see William S. Burroughs bibliography
- The Exterminator, a 1969 novel by Patrick Skene Catling
- The Exterminator, a novelization of the 1980 film by Peter McCurtin
- "The Exterminators", an illustrated short story in the 1984 anthology book Garfield: His 9 Lives
- Billy the Exterminator, a reality series previously known as The Exterminators
- The Exterminators (Doctor Who audio), a Doctor Who audio drama
- Exterminator, a 2006 set in the trading card game Doctor Who – Battles in Time

=== Comics ===
- The Exterminators (comics), a Vertigo comic book series
- Exterminators (comics), a group consisting of Spider-Man enemies
- Exterminator (comics), a Marvel Comics supervillain better known as Death-Stalker

=== Film ===
- The Exterminator, a 1945 Terrytoons animated short film featuring Gandy Goose
- The Exterminator, a 1980 American vigilante action film starring Robert Ginty
- Exterminator 2, a 1984 action film sequel
- ExTerminators, a 2009 American black comedy film starring Amber Heard, Heather Graham, and Jennifer Coolidge
- The Exterminators, a 1965 spy film

=== Television ===
- "Exterminator", episode four of Ant-Man, 2017
- "The Exterminator", a 2013 episode of Dennis the Menace and Gnasher (2009)
- "The Exterminator", episode six of Foreign Affairs (1966)
- "The Exterminator", a 2015 episode of iZombie
- "The Exterminator", a 2001 episode of King of the Hill season 5
- "The Exterminator", a 2003 episode of Modern Marvels
- "The Exterminator", a 1973 episode of The New Scooby-Doo Movies
- "The Exterminators", a 1995 episode of ChuckleVision
- "The Exterminators", a 1986 episode of Rocky Road
- "X, the Exterminator", a 2003 episode of Harvey Birdman, Attorney at Law

== People ==
- French buccaneer Daniel Montbars (born 1645), better known as Montbars the Exterminator

== Other uses ==
- Exterminator (roller coaster), an indoor roller coaster at Kennywood
- XTRMNTR, an album by Primal Scream released in 2000

== See also ==
- Extermination (disambiguation)
- Terminator (disambiguation)
