= Hasan-i Sabbah =

Ismaili religious and military leader (c. 1050–1124)

- حسن صباح
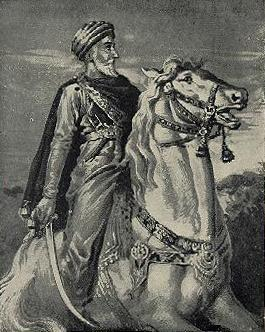
- Engraving of Hasan-i Sabbah riding a horse
- Title: Mawla, Sayyidna

Personal life
- Born: c. 1050 Qom, Seljuk Empire (present-day Qom, Iran)
- Died: 12 June 1124 (aged 73–74) Alamut Castle, Nizari Ismaili state (present-day Masoudabad, Qazvin, Iran)
- Main interests: Islamic theology; Islamic jurisprudence; Islamic law
- Occupation: Leader of Nizārī Ismā'īlī state

Religious life
- Religion: Shia Islam
- Denomination: Ismailism
- Order: Assassins
- Founder of: Nizari Ismaili state
- Jurisprudence: Nizārī; Da'a'im al-Islam

Senior posting
- Predecessor: Position established
- Successor: Kiya Buzurg-Ummid

Hasan-i Sabbah (Note: Full name: Hasan ibn Muhammad ibn Ja'far ibn Husayn ibn Muhammad ibn al-Sabbah al-Himyari; Arabic: حسن الصباح أو الحسن بن علي بن محمد بن الصباح الحميري; Persian: حسن صباح, romanized: Ḥasan-i Ṣabbāḥ) (c. 1050 – 12 June 1124; AH 518), also known as Hasan I of Alamut, was a military leader, scholar, and founder of the Nizari Ismaili movement, popularly known in the West as the Order of Assassins, as well as the Nizari Ismaili state, which he ruled from 1090 until his death in 1124. Very little is known of his early life.

His followers seized the formidable mountain fortress of Alamūt in 1090 or 1091 (AH 483) and established it as the principal power centre of the Nizari movement. Although the movement later became particularly associated with assassination, al-Sabbah did not introduce assassination as a religious duty, since the practice had already been employed by other sects, and it is not clear that he himself even advocated it. The movement that developed under and after him nevertheless acquired considerable strength and terrorized parts of the Muslim world until Alamūt was captured and destroyed by the Mongols in the 13th century.

Alongside his political and military leadership, al-Sabbah was a scholar of mathematics, particularly geometry, as well as astronomy and philosophy, especially epistemology. It is also narrated that he and the Persian polymath Omar Khayyam were close friends from their student years. Hasan and later leaders of the Order of Assassins became known in Western tradition as the "Old Man of the Mountain", a designation associated by Marco Polo with the sect's possession of the commanding fortress of Alamut.

== Sources ==
Hasan is thought to have written an autobiography, which did not survive but seems to underlie the first part of an anonymous Isma'ili biography entitled Sarguzasht-i Sayyidnā (Persian: سرگذشت سیدنا). The latter is known only from quotations made by later Persian authors. Hasan also wrote a treatise, in Persian, on the doctrine of ta'līm, called, al-Fusul al-arba'a The text is no longer in existence, but fragments are cited or paraphrased by al-Shahrastānī and several Persian historians.

== Early life and conversion ==
=== Qom and Rayy ===
The possibly autobiographical information found in Sargozasht-i Seyyednā is the main source for Hasan's background and early life. According to this, Hasan al-Sabbāh was born in the city of Qom, Persia in the 1050s to a family of Twelver Shia. His father, a Kufan Arab reportedly of Yemenite origins, had left the Sawād of Kufa, Iraq, to settle in the town of Qom, one of the first centres of Arab settlement in Persia and a stronghold of Twelver Shia. Hasan traced his descent from an ancient king (tubba') of Yemen named as-Ṣaʿb Dhu Marāthid, identified by some as Dhu'l-Qarnayn.

Early in his life, his family moved to Rayy. Rayy was a city that had a history of radical Islamic thought since the 9th century, with Hamdan Qarmaṭ as one of its teachers.

It was in this religious centre that Hasan developed a keen interest in metaphysical matters and adhered to the Twelver code of instruction. During the day he studied at home, and mastered palmistry, languages, philosophy, astronomy and mathematics (especially geometry).

Rayy was also the home of Isma'ili missionaries in the Jibal. At the time, Isma'ilism was a growing movement in Persia and other lands east of Egypt. The Persian Isma'ilis supported the da'wa ("mission") directed by the Fatimid caliphate of Cairo and recognized the authority of the Imam-Caliph al-Mustansir (d. 1094), though Isfahan, rather than Cairo, may have functioned as their principal headquarters. The Ismā'īlī mission worked on three layers: the lowest was the fida'i or foot soldier, followed by the rafīk or comrade, and finally the dā‘ī or missionary. It has been suggested that the popularity of the Ismā'īlī religion in Persia was due to the people's dissatisfaction with the Seljuk rulers, who had recently removed local rulers.

=== Conversion to Ismailism and training in Cairo ===
At the age of 17, Hasan converted and swore allegiance to the Fatimid caliph in Cairo. Hasan's studies did not end with his crossing over. He further studied under two other dā‘is, and as he proceeded on his path, he was looked upon with eyes of respect.

Hasan's austere and devoted commitment to the da'wa brought him in audience with the chief missionary of the region: 'Abdu l-Malik ibn Attash. Ibn Attash, suitably impressed with the young seventeen-year-old Hasan, made him Deputy Missionary and advised him to go to Cairo to further his studies.

However, Hasan did not initially travel to Cairo. Some historians have postulated that Hasan, following his conversion, was playing host to some members of the Fatimid caliphate, and this was leaked to the anti-Fatimid and anti-Shī‘a vizier Nizam al-Mulk. This prompted his abandoning Rayy and heading to Cairo in 1076.

Hasan took about two years to reach Cairo. Along the way he toured many other regions that did not fall in the general direction of Egypt. Isfahan was the first city that he visited. He was hosted by one of the missionaries of his youth, a man who had taught the youthful Hasan in Rayy. His name was Resi Abufasl and he further instructed Hasan.

From here he went to Arran (current Azerbaijan), hundreds of miles to the north, and from there through Armenia. Here he attracted the ire of priests following a heated discussion, and Hasan was thrown out of the town he was in.

He then turned south and traveled through Iraq, reached Damascus in Syria. He left for Egypt from Palestine. Records exist, some in the fragmentary remains of his autobiography, and from another biography written by Rashid-al-Din Hamadani in 1310, to date his arrival in Egypt at 30 August 1078.

It is unclear how long Hasan stayed in Egypt: about three years is the usually accepted length of time. He continued his studies here, and became a full missionary.

=== Return to Persia ===
Whilst he was in Cairo, studying and preaching, he incurred the displeasure of the Chief of the Army, Badr al-Jamalī. This may have been a result of the fact that Hasan supported Nizar, the Ismaili Imam-Caliph al-Mustanṣir's elder son, as the next Imam. Hasan was briefly imprisoned by Badr al-Jamali. The collapse of a minaret of the jail was taken to be an omen in favor of Hasan and he was promptly released and deported. The ship that he was traveling on was wrecked. He was rescued and taken to Syria. Traveling via Aleppo and Baghdad, he terminated his journey at Isfahan in 1081.

Hasan's life now was totally devoted to the mission. Hasan toured extensively throughout Persia. In northern Persia, touching the south shore of the Caspian Sea, are the mountains of Alborz. These mountains were home to a people who had traditionally resisted attempts by both Arabs and Turkish subjugation; this place was also a home of Shia leaning. The news of this Ismā'īlī's activities reached Nizam al-Mulk, who dispatched his soldiers with the orders for Hasan's capture. Hasan evaded them, and went deeper into the mountains.

== Capture of Alamut ==
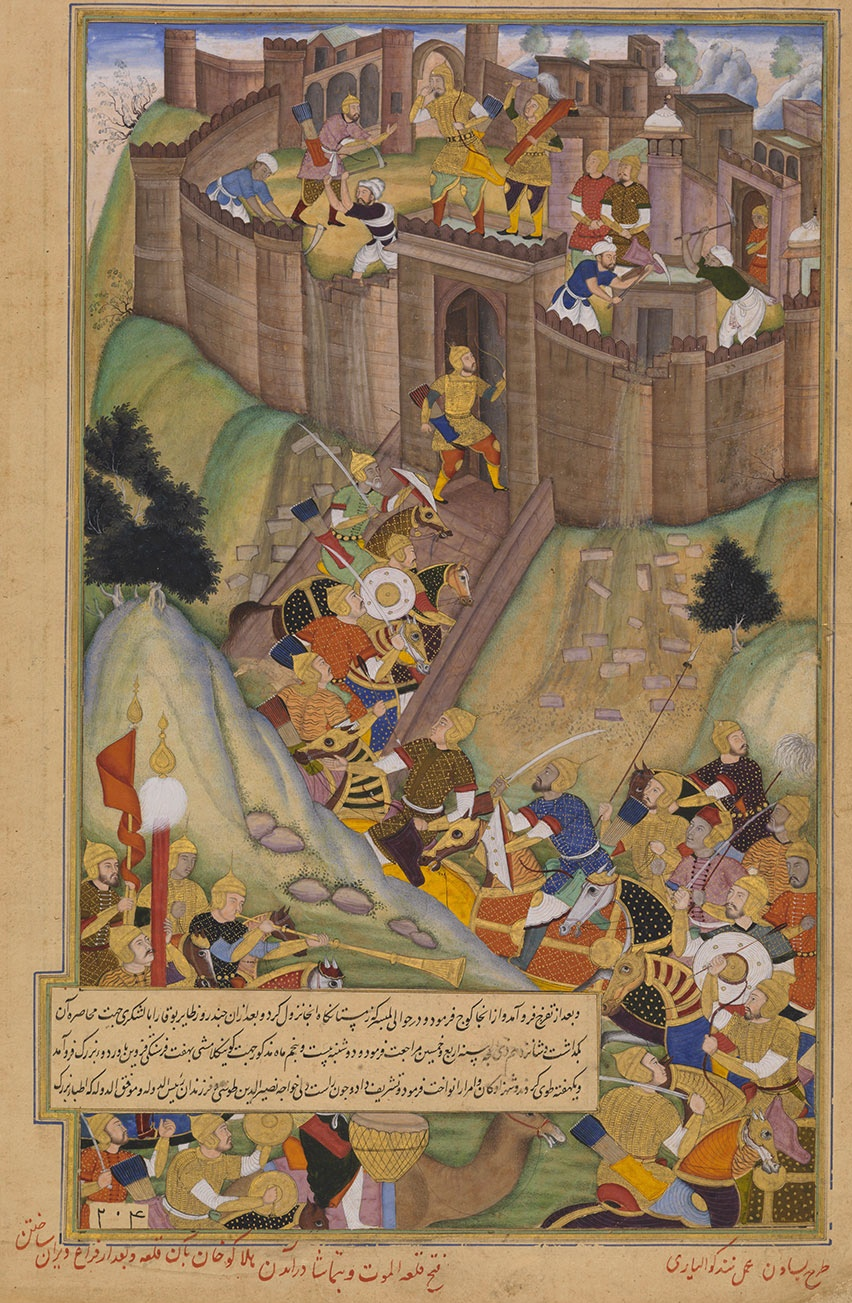
The Hashshashin's fortress of Alamut Castle

His search for a base from which to guide his mission ended when in 1088 he found the castle of Alamut in the Rudbar area (modern Qazvin, Iran). It was a fort that stood guard over a valley that was about fifty kilometers long and five kilometers wide. This fortress had been built about the year 865; legend has it that it was built by a king who saw his eagle fly up to and perch upon a rock, a propitious omen, the importance of which this king, Wah Sudan ibn Marzuban, understood. Likening the perching of the eagle to a lesson given by it, he called the fort Aluh Amu(kh)t: the "Eagles' Teaching".

Hasan's takeover of the fort was conducted without any significant bloodshed. To effect this transition Hasan employed a patient and deliberate strategy, one which took the better part of two years to effect. First Hasan sent his Daʻiyyīn and Rafīks to win over the villages in the valley, and their inhabitants. Next, key people amongst this populace were converted, and finally, in 1090, Hasan took over the fort by infiltrating it with his converts. He spend some time in the castle in disguise under the name "Dehkhoda".

While legend holds that after capturing Alamut Hasan thereafter devoted himself so faithfully to study that in the nearly 35 years he was there he never left his quarters, excepting only two times when he went up to the roof, this reported isolation is highly doubtful, given his extensive recruiting and organizational involvement in the growing Ismā'īlī insurrections in Persia and Syria. Nonetheless, Hasan was highly educated and was known for austerity, studying, translating, praying, fasting, and directing the activities of the Daʻwa: the propagation of the Nizarī doctrine was headquartered at Alamut. He knew the Qur'ān by heart, could quote extensively from the texts of most Muslim sects, and apart from philosophy, was well versed in mathematics, astronomy, alchemy, medicine, architecture, and the major scientific disciplines of his time. In a major departure from tradition, Hasan declared Persian to be the language of holy literature for Nizaris, a decision that resulted in all the Nizari Ismā'īlī literature from Persia, Syria, Afghanistan and Central Asia to be transcribed in Persian for several centuries.

== Foreign accounts ==
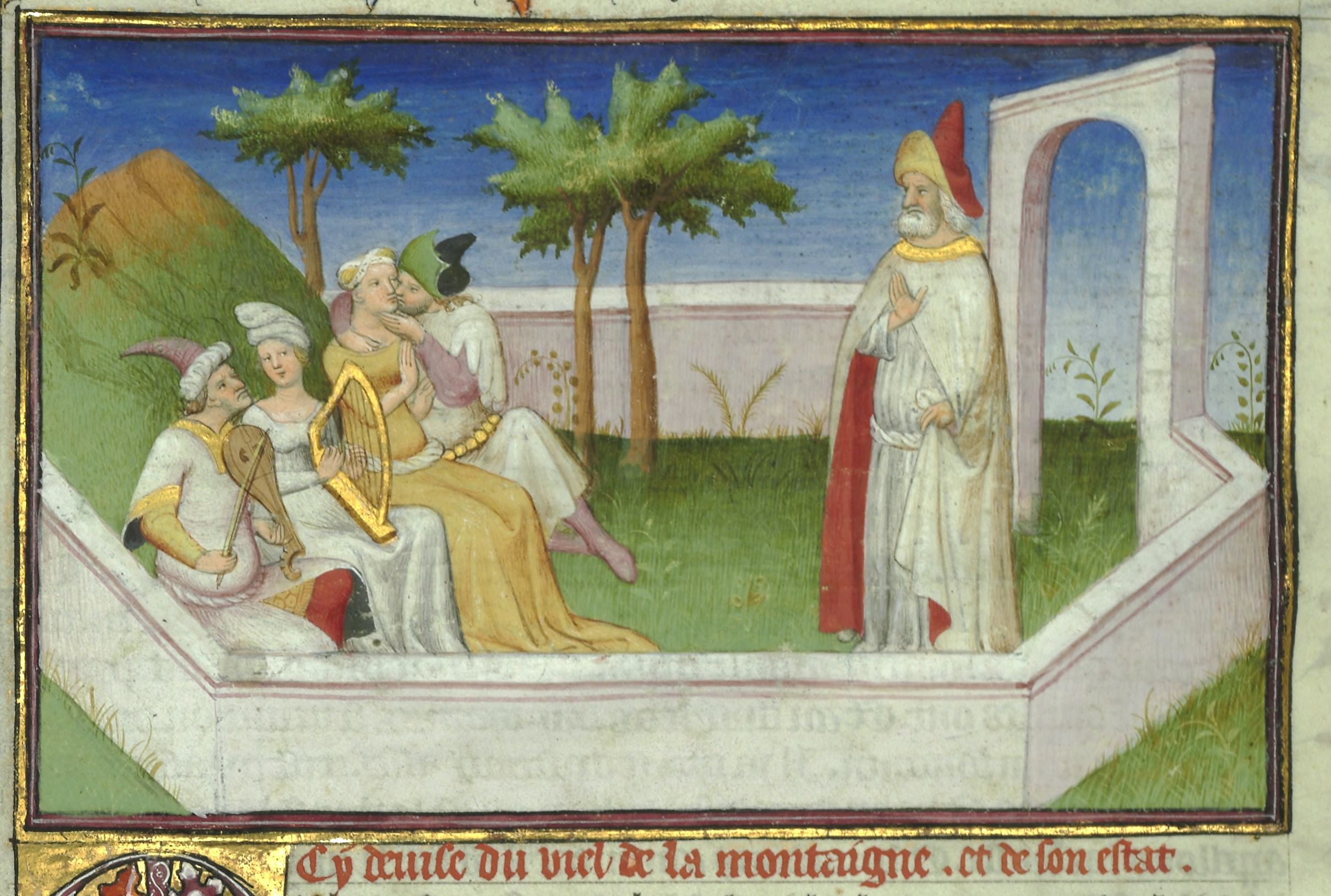
Hassan al-Sabbah (right) depicted with his followers, in the first edition of The Travels of Marco Polo, c. 1310

The leaders of Nizari Isma'ilis in Persia, were designated by Marco Polo using a Syrian equivalent term known in Europe at that time, as Elder or Old Man of the Mountain. Marco Polo's travelogue (c. 1300) describes the Old Man of the Mountain as a charlatan who devised plots to convert young men to his sect. At his court "they were educated in various languages and customs, courtly etiquette, and trained in martial and other skills". At Alamut they had "impressive libraries whose collections included books on various religious traditions, philosophical and scientific texts, and scientific equipment".

Xishiji (Chinese: 西使記), a Chinese manuscript completed in 1263, relates a story similar to Marco Polo's. The sect leaders "ordered to send assassins to hide in those kingdoms which did not surrender. They stabbed their lords, and women as well, and they died".

== Nizari doctrine ==
Historians and scholars identify Hasan-i Sabbah as the founder of the Nizari Assassins and their doctrine. It developed during the struggle for succession of Nizar to the Fatimid throne in Cairo that eventually laid the foundation of the Nizari branch of Shia Islam. Since then, as a basic element of conservative nature, the Ismaili Imamate includes a hidden imam, in addition to the visible (hazar, meaning apparent) imam of the time, acting as such in a community. An important task of the latter is the proliferation of the doctrine, and of the undisclosed imam's spiritual guidance, in learning centers having instructors proficient in teaching techniques.

Devotion of the "true believers" having "absolute faith" in the beliefs is another element originating from the times of Sabbah in Northern Iran, who reportedly "was so devout that he even had one of his sons executed after he was accused of drunkenness."

A Nizari assassin is identified as fida'i (devotee), "who offers his life for others or in the service of a particular cause."

== Personal life ==
Hasan is known for his ascetic and austere religious lifestyle. At his modest living quarters in the Alamut Castle, he spent most of his time reading, writing, and administering. During his 45 years of residence in Alamut, he apparently left his quarters only twice to ascend the rooftop.

Hasan al-Sabbah probably had one wife, two daughters, and two sons. Hasan's wife and daughters were sent to Gerdkuh as a safe place during Shirgir's campaign against Alamut; they never returned. They lived on spinning. He had both his sons executed, Muhammad for khamr and Ustad Husayn for his suspected role in the murder of da'i Husayn Qa'ini.

Hassan was highly revered by the Nizari community, whose members called him Sayyidna ("Our Master") and regularly visited his mausoleum in Rudbar before it was demolished by the Mongols.

== In popular culture ==
- Betty Bouthoul published a popular book in French titled Le grand maître des assassins (Master of the Assassins) about Hasan al-Sabbāh in 1936.
- A 1938 novel named Alamut by Vladimir Bartol is based on Hasan's rise to power.
- The British space rock group Hawkwind recorded a song called "Hassan I Sahba" on its 1977 album, Quark, Strangeness and Charm. This song was also recorded by the Brain Surgeons on their album Malpractise.
- Hasan al-Sabbāh is mentioned, often by his moniker 'The Old Man of the Mountain', in many of William S. Burroughs's novels, including Nova Express, Cities of the Red Night, The Place of Dead Roads and The Western Lands. According to Barry Miles book The Beat Hotel Burroughs was introduced to Hasan through Betty Bouthoul's book while staying in Paris, France. The full story of Burroughs' interest in Hassan al-Sabbah was told in the 2023 book, Two Assassins, by Oliver Harris and Farid Ghadami.
- He is portrayed in the Turkish TV series Uyanış: Büyük Selçuklu by Gürkan Uygun.
- He is portrayed in the Egyptian TV series Al-Hashashin by Karim Abdel Aziz.
- In the Japanese mobile game Fate/Grand Order of the Fate franchise, he is portrayed as the past and current holder of the Grand Assassin title of the Assassin class with the former being First "Hassan-i-Sabbah" and the latter being "Azrael", a much younger version of the same entity, due to him being the source of the word "assassin".
- The 1988 historical fiction novel Samarkand by Amin Maalouf depicts the relationship between Omar Khayyam, Nizaam al-Mulk, and Hassan al-Sabbah during the conquests of the Seljuk empire.
