= Terminate =

Terminate may refer to:

- Electrical termination, ending a wire or cable properly to prevent interference
- Termination of employment, the end of an employee's duration with an employer
- Terminate with extreme prejudice, a euphemism for assassination
- terminate-and-stay-resident program, utility programs used in DOS
- exit (system call), to terminate the execution of a running software program
- Terminate (software) - (terminat.exe), a shareware modem terminal and host program for MS-DOS in the 1990s

== See also ==
- Terminator (disambiguation)
- Terminus (disambiguation)
- Termination (disambiguation)
- Terminal (disambiguation)
