= Ilsø =

Ilsø is a Danish surname. Notable people with the surname include:

- Ken Ilsø (born 1986), Danish footballer
- Marco Ilsø (born 1994), Danish actor
- Rasmus Ilsø, Danish bandmember of terminal
- Tim Ilsø, (born 1976) Danish association football player
