= Ghost of a Chance =

Ghost of a Chance may refer to:

== Music ==
- Ghost of a Chance (album), by Turboweekend, 2009
- "Ghost of a Chance" (Rush song), 1992
- "Ghost of a Chance", a song from the 1921 British revue The Co-Optimists
- "Ghost of a Chance", a song by The Blades
- "Ghost of a Chance", a song by Garland Jeffreys from his 1981 LP Escape Artist
- "Ghost of a Chance", a song by Rancid from their 2017 album Trouble Maker

== Television ==
- "Ghost of a Chance" (Homicide: Life on the Street), a 1993 episode of Homicide: Life on the Street
- "Ghost of a Chance", an episode of Power Rangers Jungle Fury
- "Pandamonium/Ghost of a Chance", an episode of Iggy Arbuckle
- "Ghost of a Chance", an episode of Garfield and Friends
- "Ghost of a Chance", an episode of The Ghosts of Motley Hall
- "Ghost of a Chance, an episode of X-Men Evolution

== Film ==
- A Ghost of a Chance (1967), a Children's Film Foundation short feature
- Ghost of a Chance (1987), an American comedy TV film starring Red Foxx and Dick van Dyke
- Ghost of a Chance (1998), an American TV film directed by Paul Haggis
- A Ghost of a Chance (2011), a Japanese comedy mystery film directed by Kōki Mitani

== See also ==
- Ghost of Chance, a novella by William S. Burroughs
- "I Don't Stand a Ghost of a Chance with You", a 1932 song composed by Victor Young
