= Termination =

Termination may refer to:

== Science ==
- Termination (geomorphology), the period of time of relatively rapid change from cold, glacial conditions to warm interglacial condition
- Termination factor, in genetics, part of the process of transcribing RNA
- Termination type, in lithic reduction, a characteristic indicating the manner in which the distal end of a lithic flake detaches from a core
- Chain termination, in chemistry, a chemical reaction which halts polymerization
- Termination shock, in solar studies, a feature of the heliosphere
- Terminating computation, in computer science
  - Termination analysis, a form of program analysis in computer science
  - Termination proof, a mathematical proof concerning the termination of a program
  - Termination (term rewriting), in particular for term rewriting systems

== Technology ==
- Electrical termination, ending a wire or cable properly to prevent interference
- Termination of wires to a
  - Crimp connection
  - Electrical connector
  - Solder joint
- Abort (computing), ending a processing activity

== Other ==
- Termination (album), by Japanese band 9mm Parabellum Bullet
- Indian termination policy, U.S. government policy affecting status of Native Americans, implemented in 1953
- Terminate with extreme prejudice, a euphemism for assassination
- Abortion, as the termination of a pregnancy
- "Termination", a song by Iron Butterfly on their 1968 album In-A-Gadda-Da-Vida
- Cancellation (television), the termination of a television program
- Termination of employment
  - Dismissal (employment), the termination of employment at a company

== See also ==
- Extermination (disambiguation)
- Terminate (disambiguation)
- Terminator (disambiguation)
- Terminal (disambiguation)
- Terminus (disambiguation)
