= Adding machine (disambiguation) =

An adding machine is a form of calculator.

Adding machine may also refer to:

- The Adding Machine, 1923 play by Elmer Rice
  - The Adding Machine (film), 1969 film based on the play
  - Adding Machine (musical), 2007 musical based on the play
- The Adding Machine: Collected Essays, collection of writings by William S. Burroughs
- The von Neumann–Kakutani adding machine, a special case of a generic adding machine in ergodic theory.
