= Nova Express (album) =

Studio album by John Zorn
- Released: 22 March 2011
- Recorded: October 2010
- Genre: Avant-garde experimental music
- Length: 46:20
- Label: Tzadik TZ 7389
- Producer: John Zorn

John Zorn chronology
Caym: Book of Angels Volume 17 (2011)	Nova Express (2011)	The Satyr's Play / Cerberus (2011)

Professional ratings
Review scores
Source	Rating
Progarchives	3/5 stars

Nova Express is an album composed by John Zorn, inspired by William Burroughs prose. The album refers to four books by Burroughs Nova Express, The Ticket That Exploded, Dead Fingers Talk and Port of Saints in the track listing. Nova Express was released in March 2011 on the Tzadik label.

== Track listing ==
All compositions by John Zorn

No.	Title	Length
1.	"Chemical Garden"	3:44
2.	"Port of Saints"	5:21
3.	"Rain Flowers"	4:41
4.	"The Outer Half"	3:50
5.	"Dead Fingers Talk"	2:20
6.	"The Ticket That Exploded"	4:03
7.	"Blue Veil"	7:21
8.	"IC 2118"	7:37
9.	"Lost Words"	2:20
10.	"Between Two Worlds"	5:02

== Personnel ==
- Joey Baron - drums
- Trevor Dunn - bass
- John Medeski - piano
- Kenny Wollesen - vibes
