= Ralph Hayes =

Ralph Hayes may refer to:

- Ralph Leo Hayes (1884–1970), American Roman Catholic bishop
- Ralph Hayes (author), American author
