= Words of Advice: William S. Burroughs on the Road =

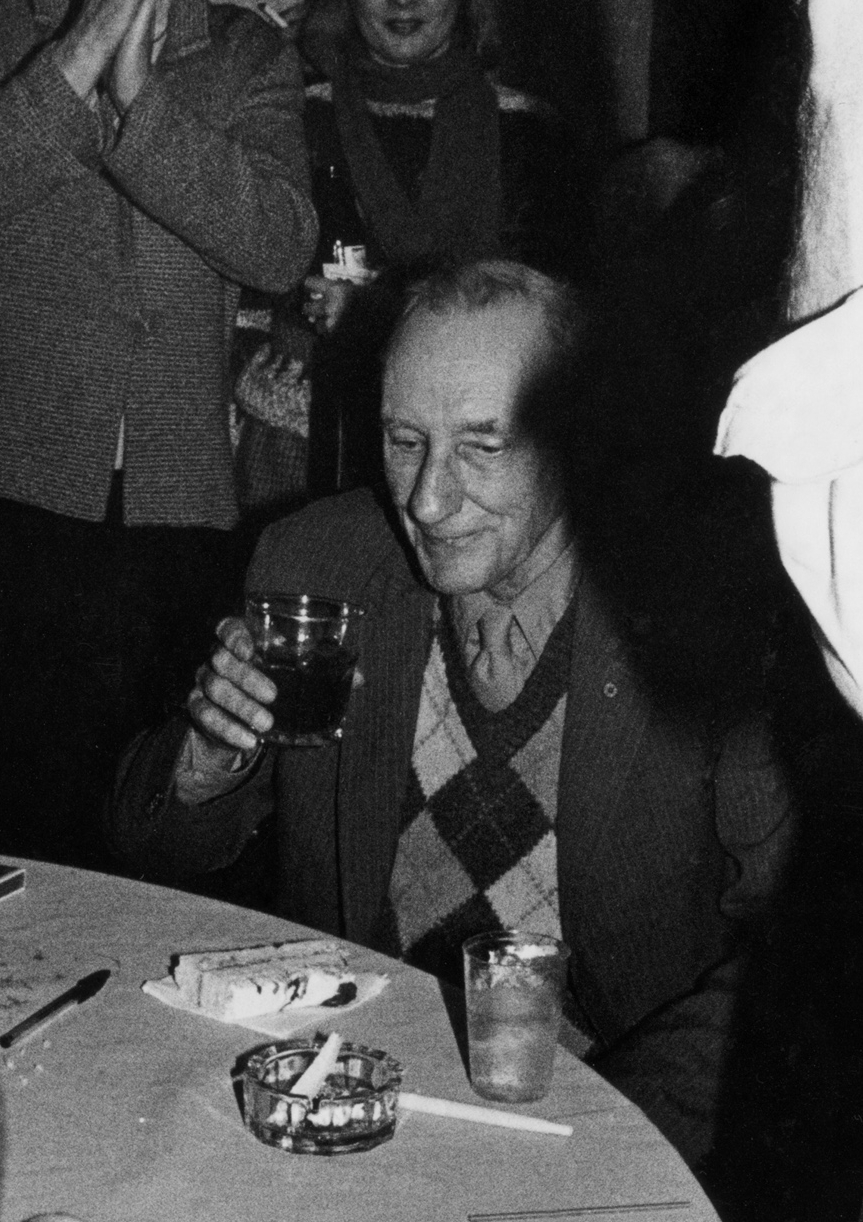
- William Burroughs in 1983
- Directed by: Lars Movin; Steen Møller Rasmussen
- Starring: William S. Burroughs; James Grauerholz; John Giorno; Hal Willner; Jennie Skerl; Regina Weinreich; Ann Douglas
- Cinematography: Steen Møller Rasmussen
- Edited by: Niels Plenge
- Music by: Material; Patti Smith; Islamic Diggers
- Distributed by: Plagiat Film
- Release date: November 9, 2007
- Running time: 74 mins
- Country: Denmark
- Language: English

Words of Advice: William S. Burroughs on the Road, is a 2007 documentary about William S. Burroughs directed by Lars Movin and Steen Møller Rasmussen and produced in Denmark. The documentary is based on never-before-seen footage from his visit to Denmark in October 1983, and from his later years in Lawrence, Kansas.

Shortly thereafter he began touring and reading his work to new generations of readers and thus establishing himself as a cult figure. The film focuses on Burroughs' unique talent as a performer, and on his later work, especially what is known as The Last Trilogy. In addition to the historic footage there are new interviews with friends and colleagues such as James Grauerholz, John Giorno, Hal Willner, Jennie Skerl, Regina Weinreich, Ann Douglas. Music by Material, Patti Smith, and Islamic Diggers.

The film premiered on 9 November 2007 at the Copenhagen International Documentary Festival in Copenhagen and the book and a Burroughs photo exhibition were launched the same night. The first international screening took place at the Paradiso in Amsterdam, as part of a Burroughs tribute event on 10 November 2007. Rasmussen was awarded the Danish Film Institute's Roos Award 2007, for "outstanding efforts in documentary filmmaking" on the basis of the film.
