= James Grauerholz =

American writer and book editor (1953–2026)

- Born: December 14, 1952; Coffeyville, Kansas, US
- Died: January 1, 2026 (aged 73); Kansas, US
- Education: University of Kansas
- Occupations: Writer and editor
- Known for: Bibliographer and literary executor of William S. Burroughs

James Grauerholz (December 14, 1952 – January 1, 2026) was an American writer and editor. He was the bibliographer and literary executor of the estate of William S. Burroughs.

== Life and career ==
Grauerholz was born in Coffeyville, Kansas, on December 14, 1952. He attended the University of Kansas for a year before dropping out and traveling to New York City. By his own admission, he was fascinated with Beat Generation literature and authors.

He became acquainted with Burroughs in the 1970s while befriending Allen Ginsberg in New York City. Ginsberg recommended Grauerholz to Burroughs as a possible assistant and their working relationship began in this simple manner, yet grew to be a major factor in the popularization of Burroughs and his works. Grauerholz became Burroughs's friend and business manager until the author's death in 1997.

Grauerholz helped edit a trilogy of novels: Cities of the Red Night (1981), The Place of Dead Roads (1985), and The Western Lands (1987). As Burroughs's business manager, Grauerholz spearheaded reading tours in the 1980s and 1990s, and wrote editorial copy for Interzone, a compilation of stories. He quit working for Burroughs and returned to Kansas in the early 1980s, and this quickly led Burroughs to relocate to the Midwestern university town of Lawrence, Kansas, to work more closely with Grauerholz again. Burroughs's My Education: A Book of Dreams (1995) credits Grauerholz as editing the final work; Oliver Harris thanks Grauerholz for editorial assistance in the epistolary collection The Letters of William S. Burroughs 1945-1959. Up until Burroughs's death in 1997, Grauerholz supported him, getting him reading engagements, commercial endorsements (Nike shoes), and parts in films (Drugstore Cowboy), as well as recording Burroughs's readings. He looked after Burroughs's physical needs as well, taking him to a methadone clinic in Kansas City weekly, as well as providing him with companionship and acting as a kind of social secretary to the many people that came to Kansas to meet Burroughs.

Grauerholz wrote biographical sketches for a Burroughs reader, Word Virus, and edited a posthumous release of Burroughs’ diaries, Last Words: The Final Journals of William S. Burroughs. Grauerholz worked on a full-length biography on Burroughs, but reportedly handed his writings and other material in the project to Barry Miles in March 2010. The book, Call Me Burroughs: A Life, was published in 2014, with Miles as the sole credited author.

In 2024, the compilation album Life's Too Good to Keep was released on Bandcamp and as a double 180-gram vinyl set.

Grauerholz died from complications of pneumonia at a Kansas hospital, on January 1, 2026, at the age of 73.

== Works as editor or co-editor of William Burroughs ==
- Cities of the Red Night, 1981
- The Place of Dead Roads, 1985
- The Western Lands, 1987
- My Education: A Book of Dreams, 1995
- Interzone, 1985
- Last Words: The Final Journals of William S. Burroughs, 2000

Audio productions

- Naked Lunch (Warner, 1995)
- Let Me Hang You (Khannibalism, 2016)

Both recordings produced by Grauerholz and Hal Wilner, with music by Wayne Horvitz, Bill Frisell and Eyvind Kang.

== Works as author ==
- Grauerholz, James, and Ira Silverberg (2000). Word Virus: The William S. Burroughs Reader. Grove Press. (Editor and author of biographical sketches preceding each chapter)
- Grauerholz, James. The Death of Joan Vollmer Burroughs: What Really Happened?. American Studies Department, University of Kansas. Online.
- Grauerholz, James. Rusty Jack (1974). Cherry Valley, N.Y.: Cherry Valley Editions. (Poetry chapbook)
