= Dead City Radio =

Studio album by William S. Burroughs
- Released: 31 August 1990
- Recorded: December 1988–June 1989 Hairball 3, Lawrence, Kansas
- Genre: Avant-garde/Experimental/spoken word
- Label: Island
- Producer: Hal Willner, Nelson Lyon

Dead City Radio is a musical album by Beat Generation author William S. Burroughs, released by Island Records in 1990. The CD is a collection of readings by Burroughs set to a broad range of musical compositions. It was produced by Hal Willner and Nelson Lyon, with musical accompaniment from John Cale, Donald Fagen, Lenny Pickett, Chris Stein, alternative rock band Sonic Youth, and the NBC Symphony Orchestra, among others. It was dedicated to "Keith Haring, at the Apocalypse."

== Background ==
Although not Burroughs' first album—he released his first spoken word album Call Me Burroughs in the 1960s and was a fixture on the Giorno Poetry Systems collections of the 1970s and 1980s—Dead City Radio was the first release to receive wide public attention. Willner came up with the idea for the album after booking Burroughs for a December 1981 spot on Saturday Night Live, in which he read "Twilight's Last Gleaming" over a pre-recorded NBC Symphony Orchestra rendition of "The Star-Spangled Banner." Later, over drinks, the two bonded over their love of actress Marlene Dietrich, and Burroughs began singing the German standard "Ich bin von Kopf bis Fuß auf Liebe eingestellt" (Falling in Love Again), a song associated with the actress. Willner likened Burroughs to "true Americana," saying: "He should be right up there in front of a map or a railroad track or a flag, as you might see John Wayne or Johnny Cash."

The material performed by Burroughs on the album included excerpts from some of his famous works such as Naked Lunch, as well as a couple of items from his 1989 short story collection Tornado Alley. The track "Kill the Badger!" is an excerpt from Burroughs' novella The Cat Inside. A music video was created Burroughs' reading of "A Thanksgiving Prayer" (a poem from Tornado Alley); the reading (like the book from which it came) is dedicated to John Dillinger. Burroughs prefaces his reading of the short story "Where He Was Going" with a brief discussion of its inspiration and origins. The brief narrative "Brion Gysin's All-Purpose Bedtime Story" is taken from Ghost of Chance, a novella Burroughs would publish in 1991. Several tracks include Burroughs discussing elements of Christianity and The Bible in a conversational style, and one track has Burroughs reciting the Sermon on the Mount while adding editorial comment.

Most of Burroughs' readings from the album were recorded at his home in Lawrence, Kansas between December 12 and 15 1988, with further recordings taking place on June 24, 1989. The music was added at a later date. Burroughs' recording of "Falling in Love Again" was included as a bonus track and is the only commercially available track as of 2012 to depict the author actually singing. Gus Van Sant produced a video starring Burroughs to promote the album.

The track "Ah Pook the Destroyer" was later used as the soundtrack for the acclaimed animated short film Ah Pook Is Here. Burroughs' song "Falling in Love Again" plays over the closing credits of the film.

== Track listing ==
1. "William's Welcome (What Are You Here For?)" (featuring Sonic Youth, music by Lenny Pickett)
2. "A Thanksgiving Prayer" (music by Frank Denning)
3. "Naked Lunch Excerpts (You Got Any Eggs for Fats?)/Dinner Conversation (The Snakes)" (music by Frank Denning)
4. "Ah Pook the Destroyer/Brion Gysin's All-Purpose Bedtime Story" (featuring John Cale)
5. "After-Diner Conversation (An Atrocious Conceit)/Where He Was Going" (music by Frank Denning)
6. "Kill the Badger!" (music by Buryl Reed)
7. "A New Standard by Which to Measure Infamy" (featuring Donald Fagen)
8. "The Sermon on the Mount 1 (WSB Reads The Good Book)" (music by Lenny Pickett)
9. "No More Stalins, No More Hitlers" (featuring John Cale)
10. "The Sermon on the Mount 2" (music by Lenny Pickett)
11. "Scandal at the Jungle Hiltons" (featuring Allen Ginsberg)
12. "The Sermon on the Mount 3" (music by Lenny Pickett)
13. "Love Your Enemies" (featuring John Cale)
14. "Dr. Benway's House" (featuring Sonic Youth)
15. "Apocalypse" (music by Bill Giant, Eugene Cines, Frank Denning, Ray Ellis)
16. "The Lord's Prayer" (featuring Chris Stein & Sonic Youth)
17. "Ich bin von Kopf bis Fuß auf Liebe eingestellt (Falling in Love Again)" (Friedrich Hollander)

== Personnel ==
- William S. Burroughs - Primary Artist, Vocals, Voices
- Maxine Neuman - Cello
- Lenny Pickett - Clarinet, Track Performer, Woodwind, arranger
- Tom Varner - French Horn
- NBC Symphony Orchestra - Performing Ensemble
- Cheryl Hardwick - Organ, Piano, Track Performer
- Bobby Previte - Percussion
- Donald Fagen - Track Performer
- Sonic Youth - Track Performer
- Chris Stein - Track Performer
- Dennis Martin - Vocals
- Leslie Miller - Vocals
- Frank Simms - Vocals, Technical Credits
- Arlene Martel - Vocals
- Allen Ginsberg - Contributor
- Kim Gordon - Contributor
- Thurston Moore - Contributor
- Lee Ranaldo - Contributor
- Adrian Boot - Cover Photo
- Joe Ferla - Engineer
- Chris Laidlaw - Engineer
- Hal Willner - Engineer, Liner Notes, Producer
- Nelson Lyon - Producer
- Jack Adelman - Mastering
- Executive producer: Les Michaels
- Associate producer: James Grauerholz
