= The Junky's Christmas =

Short story by William S. Burroughs

"The Junky's Christmas" is a short story by William S. Burroughs. It originally appears in the 1989 collection Interzone and on the 1993 album Spare Ass Annie and Other Tales. It was later adapted into short claymation film and a spoken word version was performed through a collaboration between William S. Burroughs and Kurt Cobain.

== Plot ==
On Christmas Day, penniless and withdrawing from opiates, Danny emerges from a 72-hour stay in a police holding cell. Hoping to make enough money to buy his next hit of heroin, he scours the streets looking for something to steal. After an unsuccessful attempt to break into a parked car, he discovers an unattended suitcase sitting in a doorway. He makes off with the case and takes it to an abandoned park to examine its contents. There he finds that the case contains two severed human legs. Disgusted, he discards the legs and tries to find a buyer for the suitcase. He finds a buyer who gives him three dollars but also informs him that the local heroin dealer has been arrested.

Unable to find heroin anywhere Danny decides to visit a doctor with the hopes of obtaining some morphine. When he reaches the doctor’s house he pretends to be suffering from facial neuralgia. The doctor is suspicious but gives Danny a quarter of a grain (about 16 mg) of morphine free of charge.

With his morphine tablet secreted away, Danny rents a room for two dollars. As he prepares to inject the morphine, he hears groaning coming from the next room. Distracted, he follows the sound of the groaning across the hall to find a young man suffering from kidney stones. Danny offers to call an ambulance, but soon realizes that the paramedics will not come as they believe the young man is faking illness to obtain opiates. Danny selflessly administers his morphine to the young man. The morphine immediately alleviates the young man's pain. Danny returns to his room. All of a sudden he begins feeling the effects of heroin; it appears that his good deed has been rewarded with "the immaculate fix". Danny nods off to sleep.

== Film adaptation ==
In 1993, The Junky's Christmas was adapted into a short claymation film which was co-directed by Nick Donkin and Melodie McDaniel and produced by Francis Ford Coppola. The film was released by Koch Vision on DVD in North America on November 21, 2006. Burroughs' reading of the story recorded for Spare Ass Annie serves as the narration of the film, while Burroughs appears in live-action footage at the beginning and end of the film.

== "The 'Priest' They Called Him" ==
"The 'Priest' They Called Him" is a heavily revised later version of "The Junky's Christmas", published in Exterminator! (1970). A spoken word version of this story was read by Burroughs over a guitar track by Kurt Cobain.
