= The Satyr's Play / Cerberus =

Studio album by John Zorn
- Released: April 19, 2011
- Recorded: January and April 2010
- Genre: Avant-garde, jazz, contemporary classical music
- Length: 37:09
- Label: Tzadik TZ 7390
- Producer: John Zorn

John Zorn chronology
Nova Express (2011)	The Satyr's Play / Cerberus (2011)	Enigmata (2011)

The Satyr's Play / Cerberus is the fourteenth studio album composed by John Zorn which as recorded in New York City in January and April 2010 and released on the Tzadik label in April 2011. Zorn signed and numbered 666 copies of the CD and produced 66 copies of a limited edition book version which were individualised and hand bound in black goat skin.

== Reception ==
Professional ratings
Review scores
Source	Rating
Allmusic	4/5 stars

Allmusic called the album "An intriguing Zorn project, highly recommended for Zorn lovers".

== Track listing ==
All compositions by John Zorn

1. "Ode I" - 3:48
2. "Ode II" - 3:39
3. "Ode III" - 2:54
4. "Ode IV" - 3:50
5. "Ode V" - 2:35
6. "Ode VI" - 4:33
7. "Ode VII" - 3:36
8. "Ode VIII" - 1:39
9. "Cerberus" - 10:34

== Personnel ==
- Cyro Baptista, Kenny Wollesen – percussion (tracks 1–8)
- Peter Evans – trumpet (track 9)
- David Taylor – bass trombone (track 9)
- Marcus Rojas – tuba (track 9)

=== Production ===
- Marc Urselli – engineer, audio mixer
- John Zorn and Kazunori Sugiyama – producers
