= At the Gates of Paradise =

Studio album by John Zorn
- Released: September 2011
- Recorded: May 2011
- Genre: Avant-garde, jazz, classical
- Length: 48:29
- Label: Tzadik TZ 7392
- Producer: John Zorn

John Zorn chronology
Enigmata (2011)	At the Gates of Paradise (2011)	A Dreamers Christmas (2011)

At the Gates of Paradise is an album by John Zorn released on Zorn's own label, Tzadik Records, in 2011 and featuring music inspired by William Blake and the Gnostic texts from the Nag Hammadi library.

== Reception ==
Professional ratings
Review scores
Source	Rating
Allmusic	4/5 stars

The Allmusic review by Thom Jurek awarded the album 4 stars stating "At the Gates of Paradise is, like its predecessors, among the most enjoyable and illuminating recordings in Zorn's later canon because its lyricism, rhythmic pulses, and grooves are accessible to virtually anyone".

== Track listing ==
All compositions by John Zorn

1. "The Eternals" - 5:55
2. "Song of Innocence" - 6:44
3. "A Dream of Nine Nights" - 8:33
4. "Light Forms" - 3:23
5. "The Aeons" - 5:52
6. "Liber XV" - 6:28
7. "Dance of Albion" - 6:36
8. "Song of Experience" - 4:58

== Personnel ==
- John Medeski - piano, organ
- Kenny Wollesen - vibes
- Trevor Dunn - bass
- Joey Baron - drums
