= Enigmata (album) =

Studio album by John Zorn
- Released: June 2011
- Genre: Avant-garde, experimental music
- Length: 43:41
- Label: Tzadik TZ 7391
- Producer: John Zorn

John Zorn chronology
The Satyr's Play / Cerberus (2011)	Enigmata (2011)	At the Gates of Paradise (2011)

Enigmata is an album of John Zorn compositions performed by Marc Ribot and Trevor Dunn, conducted by Zorn. It was released by Tzadik Records in 2011.

== Recording and music ==
The twelve pieces are "etude-variations written in the classical tradition" by Zorn. Some parts were composed and atonal; others were improvised and conducted by Zorn. They are performed by Marc Ribot on electric guitar and Trevor Dunn on five-string electric bass.

Zorn wrote in the liner notes: "I do what I do regardless of what the outside world might think, want or expect, and although this has alienated my audience, the critical establishment and the academy countless times through my four decades of activity, the feeling that comes from creation on one's own terms far outweighs any such mundane considerations."

== Release and reception ==
Enigmata was released by Tzadik Records in June 2011. The New York City Jazz Record reviewer suggested that it was unlikely to appeal to purists of any genre of music, and wrote that "It's daunting before you put it on and can be rather unpleasant while it is. [...] As you play the CD, however, you realize it's not as scary and uncompromising as you might have feared".

== Track listing ==
1. "Enigma One"
2. "Enigma Two"
3. "Enigma Three"
4. "Enigma Four"
5. "Enigma Five"
6. "Enigma Six"
7. "Enigma Seven"
8. "Enigma Eight"
9. "Enigma Nine"
10. "Enigma Ten"
11. "Enigma Eleven"
12. "Enigma Twelve"

== Personnel ==
- Trevor Dunn - 5-string electric bass
- Marc Ribot - electric guitar
