= Regina Weinreich =

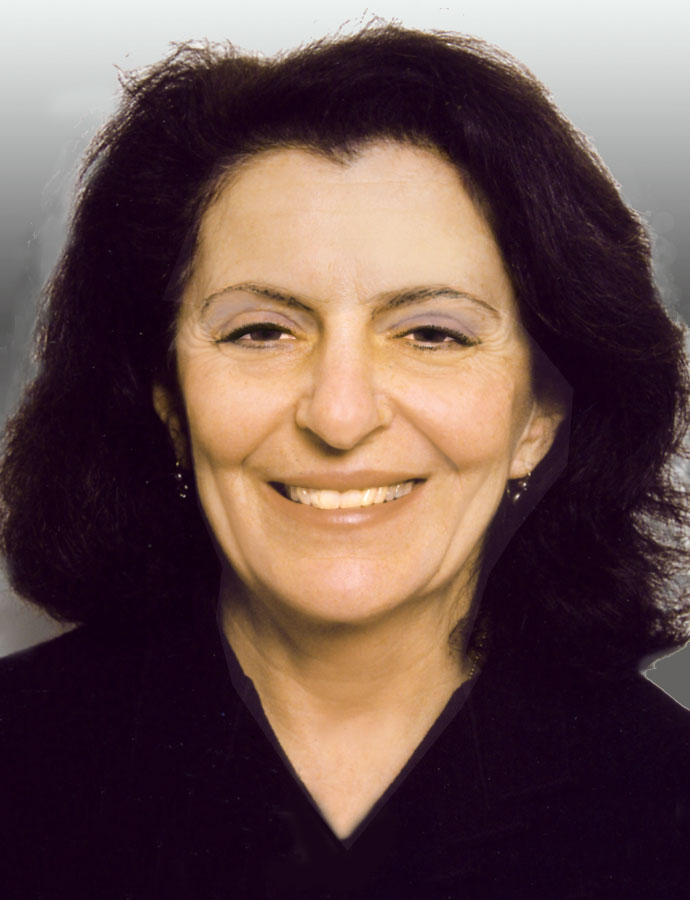
- Regina Weinreich
- Born: January 3, 1949; Munich, Germany,
- Occupation: Writer

Regina Weinreich is a writer, journalist, teacher, and scholar of the artists of the Beat Generation.

Her work includes the documentary Paul Bowles: The Complete Outsider and books entitled The Beat Generation: An American Dream, Kerouac's Spontaneous Poetics, and Kerouac's Book of Haikus. Her blog Gossip Central, a diary of the arts, is a collaboration with her husband graphic designer Bob Salpeter.

She has been published in The Paris Review, Five Points, The New York Times, The Washington Post, The Village Voice, Boston Globe, San Francisco Chronicle, Talk Magazine, Entertainment Weekly, American Book Review, Hamptons Magazine, The Forward, The East Hampton Star, The Huffington Post, among others.

== See also ==
- Paul Bowles
- Jack Kerouac
