= Terminatrix =

Terminatrix may refer to:

- T-X, a fictional character in the film Terminator 3: Rise of the Machines
- Ravonna, a fictional character in the Marvel Universe
- Terminatrix (淫殺の虜, Insatsu no Toriko), a 1995 Japanese film starring Kei Mizutani

== See also ==
- Terminator (disambiguation)
- Lady Terminator, a 1989 Indonesian film
