= Cyclops (magazine) =

- Cover of the first issue
- Staff writers: William S. Burroughs, M. John Harrison
- Photographer: Graham Keen
- Categories: Comics
- Frequency: Monthly
- Publisher: Innocence & Experience
- Founder: Graham Keen
- Founded: 1970; 56 years ago
- First issue: July 1970
- Final issue: October 1970
- Country: United Kingdom
- Based in: London
- Language: English

Cyclops ("The First English Adult Comic Paper") was a comic-strip tabloid published in London in 1970 by former International Times art editor Graham Keen working with Matt Hoffman an American, handling advertising and distribution. Published by Innocence & Experience, Cyclops had national distribution and a large print run, but lasted only four issues.

In addition to reprinting comics by Spain Rodriguez, Vaughn Bodē, and Gilbert Shelton, Cyclops also published original work by U.K. artists like Raymond Lowry, Edward Barker (also called "Edweird"), Mal Dean, David Jarrett, and Australian Martin Sharp, a poster artist from OZ magazine. Some early Alex Raymond Flash Gordon comics from the 1930s were reprinted as well.

Novelist M. John Harrison, who would go on to become an exponent of the British New Wave, and literary editor of New Worlds, scripted comic stories which were illustrated by Richard Glynn Jones. American novelist William S. Burroughs scripted The Unspeakable Mr. Hart, illustrated by Malcolm Mc Neill. (Note: Burroughs admired the Maya codices and he and McNeill wanted to create "an unprecedented, full-blown word/image novel." McNeill and Burroughs continued to work together for years, but only eleven pages (of an intended 120) of their Ah Pook Is Here were published — in Rush magazine in 1976. John Calder and Viking produced a text-only version in the collection Ah Pook Is Here: And Other Texts. Until 2012, only fragments of this project had been published, and only online, when Fantagraphics announced its publication of McNeill's memoirs Observed While Falling and Ah Pook in a two-volume package in the summer of 2011.)

== History ==
Keen's photographs had appeared in IT and he became art editor in 1968. One of IT's founders, Barry Miles, was an art college friend from Cheltenham College of Art. In 1969/71 Keen lodged with Miles and his wife Sue in Lord North Street, London, and ran Cyclops from there. He managed to bring in William S. Burroughs, who contributed The Unspeakable Mr. Hart. Burroughs wanted Malcolm McNeill – at the time a senior student at the Hornsey College of Art who had not read much Burroughs – to do the artwork.

Price may have been a factor in the demise of Cyclops: it cost three shillings (3/-) for 20p. of material, whereas the International Times, with app. 24 pages cost 1/6 d; an average paperback 3/6 d., and an American comic 1/-. (Note: In 1971-72, the International Times published seven issues of another comic book, Nasty Tales, concentrating on American reprints.)

== Issues ==
1. (July 1970) — work by Vaughn Bodé, Richard Glyn Jones, Larry Lewis, Bernard Power Canavan: Orcus (p. 4), (Note: Indebted to Spain's Trashman.) Martin Sharp (untitled; p. 3), (Note: Resembling Victor Moscoso's work in Zap #2, 1968.) Raymond Lowry, Edward Barker, and David Jarrett
2. (Aug. 1970) — work by Lowry, Edward Barker ("Edweard"), Mal Dean, and Flash Gordon reprints
3. (Sept. 1970) — work by Mike Bygraves, Lowry, Dean, Jarrett, Flash Gordon reprints, and an advert by Alan Moore for the London comic shop Dark They Were, and Golden-Eyed (p. 8)
4. (Oct. 1970) — work by Judy Watson, Richard Jones, Mike Harrison, Spain Rodriguez, Lowry, Barker, Dean, Jarrett, Flash Gordon reprints, and an advert by Alan Moore for the London comic shop Dark They Were, and Golden-Eyed (p. 12)
