= Termini =

Termini can refer to:

- Termini (architecture), human heads and busts that continue down to square, tapering, pillar-like forms
- Termini Station (Rome), a main line railway station in Rome
- Termini (Rome Metro), an underground railway station in Rome
- Termini Imerese, a town in Sicily
- Termini, a frazione of Massa Lubrense, Campania, Italy

== See also ==
- Terminus (disambiguation), the singular of termini (although places named Termini in Italian come from the Latin plural thermae, "baths")
- Terminal (disambiguation)
