= Extermination =

Extermination or exterminate may refer to:

- Pest control, elimination of insects or vermin
- Extermination (crime), the killing of humans on a large scale
- Genocide, at least one of five "acts committed with intent to destroy, in whole or in part, a national, ethnical, racial or religious group"
- "Exterminate!", the battle cry of the Daleks in the British television show Doctor Who
- As a proper noun
  - Extermination (comics), a Marvel Comics crossover event featuring the X-Men
  - Extermination (video game), a 2001 PlayStation 2 game by Deep Space
  - ExtermiNation, a 2015 album by heavy metal band Raven
  - "Exterminate!" (song), a 1992 song by Snap!

== See also ==
- Kill (disambiguation)
- Extinction
- Extermination camps
- Exterminator (disambiguation)
- Termination (disambiguation)
