= Port of Saints =

Novel by William S. Burroughs

- First edition
- Author: William S. Burroughs
- Language: English
- Publisher: Covent Garden Press
- Publication date: January 1973
- Publication place: United States
- Media type: Print (Hardcover and Paperback)
- Pages: 133 pp
- ISBN: 0-902843-80-X

Port of Saints is a novel by author William S. Burroughs. First published in 1973, it was the last major work Burroughs wrote during his self-imposed exile in Europe during the late 1960s and early 1970s.

One of Burroughs' shorter novels, the book utilizes characters from numerous earlier works, and also introduces characters that would re-appear later in the Burroughs canon. Described as an "erotic fantasy", the novel (as explained by Burroughs scholar Jenny Skerl) consists of several plotlines shuffled together, with the "main" plot loosely dealing with a group of wild boys that seek to rewrite history by travelling through time to various times and places.

Burroughs spent the rest of the decade writing shorter works and essays. His following novel was Cities of the Red Night, published in 1981. The same year Port of Saints was released, Burroughs also published the short story collection Exterminator! and several chapbooks.

A revised edition of the novel was published in 1980.

It is considered a sequel to his previous novel, “The Wild Boys: A Book of the Dead”
