= The "Priest" They Called Him =

Extended play by William S. Burroughs

"The 'Priest' They Called Him"

Single by William S. Burroughs and Kurt Cobain
- Released: July 1, 1993
- Recorded: September 25, 1992 at Red House Studios in Lawrence, Kansas and November 1992 at Laundry Room Studio in Seattle, Washington
- Genre: Beat poetry; spoken word; noise; free improvisation
- Length: 9:41
- Label: Tim/Kerr
- Songwriters: William S. Burroughs, Kurt Cobain
- Producers: Thor Lindsay (exec.); James Grauerholz

Kurt Cobain singles chronology
| "The 'Priest' They Called Him" (1993) | "And I Love Her" (2015) |

"The 'Priest' They Called Him" is a collaboration between the American novelist William S. Burroughs and musician Kurt Cobain. On the piece, Cobain provides noisy, discordant guitar backing based on "Silent Night" and "The Star-Spangled Banner" to Burroughs' deadpan reading. Originally released as a limited edition 10-inch picture disc on Tim/Kerr Records in 1993, it was subsequently re-released on CD and 10-inch vinyl.

== History ==
Kurt Cobain was first exposed to the work of beat poet William S. Burroughs while a senior in high school, and Burroughs' writing became an influence on his songwriting. In 1992, Cobain contacted Burroughs about possibly doing a collaboration. Burroughs responded by sending him a recording of "The Junky's Christmas" (which he recorded in his studio in Lawrence, Kansas). Two months later in a studio in Seattle, Cobain added guitar backing based on "Silent Night" and "To Anacreon in Heaven". The two would meet shortly later in Lawrence, Kansas and produce "The 'Priest' They Called Him", which is a spoken word version of "The Junky's Christmas".

== Plot ==
This short piece read was first published in Exterminator! The titular "Priest" is the protagonist, an otherwise nameless heroin addict trying to score on Christmas Eve. After selling a leather suitcase filled with a pair of severed legs (and subsequently visiting the ubiquitous crooked doctor), the Priest returns to a boarding house with a fix. While preparing, the Priest is interrupted by muffled moans from the next room. He knocks and finds a crippled Mexican boy in the throes of agonizing withdrawal. After giving the boy his drugs as an act of charity, the Priest returns to his room, reclines on his bed and dies, in what Burroughs calls "the immaculate fix." Another reading of this piece was also used in The Junky's Christmas, a short animated film in 1990.

== Artwork and packaging ==
The cover artwork and treatment was by Mark Trunz, who also took the picture of Cobain. Krist Novoselic is featured on the cover as the Priest. The picture of Burroughs was taken by Gus Van Sant for his book 108 Photographs. Steve Connell created the jacket design.

The original 10-inch record is one-sided, with cover art completely covering the disc along with a hand written number, while the flip-side features etched autographs of Cobain and Burroughs: "William S. Burroughs" and "Kurtis Donald Cȯhbaine". The release details "TK 92-10044" are etched in the inner groove of Side A.

The 10-inch vinyl reissue has cover art in black and white in the center on side one, which contains the audio. Side two has their autographs.

== Recording ==
William Burroughs recorded at Red House Studios in Lawrence, Kansas, on September 25, 1992. It was engineered by Brad Murphy. Cobain's guitar part was recorded in November 1992. Barrett Jones pushed the record button straight to DAT at Laundry Room Studios in Seattle, Washington. The mixdown was engineered by Ed Rose with James Grauerholz at Red House Studios; Grauerholtz also produced. Thor Lindsay served as executive producer.

== Release ==
10,000 copies were released on black vinyl, 10,000 on picture discs, 5,000 regular discs, and 5,000 with yellow vinyl on the B-side. All of the discs were hand numbered.

== Reception ==
A July 1993 review in CMJ magazine by Beth Renaud stated that "This nearly 10-minute story is another from the endless box of junkie tales, black with Burroughs' macabre, low-key humor. Behind his unmistakeable voice is Cobain's over-fraught guitar work, a la Steve Fisk's weirdo accompaniment to the Steven Jesse Bernstein album". In 1993, the release received airplay on college radio in the United States. Billboard reported that sales of the release increased after Cobain's death in 1994.

== Personnel ==
All personnel credits adapted from the single's liner notes.

Performers

- William S. Burroughs – voice
- Kurt Cobain – guitar

Technical personnel

- James Grauerholz – producer, mixing engineer
- Thor Lindsay – executive producer
- Brad Murphy – engineer (Note: Murphy was the engineer during the sessions for Burrough's recording.)
- Barrett Jones – engineer (Note: Jones was the engineer during the sessions for Cobain's recording.)
- E. J. Rose – mixing

Design personnel

- Steve Connell – design, layout
- Mark Trunz – photography
- Gus Van Sant – photography

== Charts ==
| Chart (1993) | Peak position |
|---|---|
| US Progressive Retail (CMJ) | 32 |
