= Call Me Burroughs =

Studio album by William S. Burroughs
- Released: 1965
- Genre: Avant-garde/spoken word
- Length: 43:22
- Label: The English Bookshop, Paris
- Producer: Ian Sommerville

William S. Burroughs chronology
Call Me Burroughs (1965)	The Nova Convention (1979)

Call Me Burroughs is a spoken word album by Beat Generation author William S. Burroughs, which was released on LP by The English Bookshop, Paris, in June 1965, and then issued in the United States by ESP-Disk, New York, in 1966. Rhino Word Beat reissued the album on Compact Disc in 1995, the company's first ever reissue.

All of the readings were from Burroughs' novels Naked Lunch, The Soft Machine, and Nova Express.

== Production ==
According to Barry Miles, Burroughs believed "it was Gaît Frogé's idea to record Call Me Burroughs". Frogé was the owner of the English Bookshop in Paris, located at 42 Rue de Seine, and the album was recorded there, in what Jean-Jacques Lebel described as its "vaulted medieval basement." Frogé paid producer Ian Sommerville a flat fee, and asked Fluxus poet Emmett Williams and Lebel to write liner notes, which were published in both English and French. Burroughs stated that he believed the recording had "almost certainly" been made "using Brion Gysin's broadcast-standard Uher" tape recorder. The album was pressed in 1965, with a date of April of that year on the French liner notes.

Frogé published 1,000 copies of the album, and Miles points out that "For many years, Call Me Burroughs was the only recording of William Burroughs available." In 1966, Bernard Stollman's ESP-Disk label released the album in the United States, extending its reach. According to Miles, Stollman simply added the ESP logo and address to the original sleeve.

== Influence ==
The album would go on to have a wide influence, particularly in England. Barry Miles, in his liner notes for the 1995 Rhino rerelease, says, "The Beatles may have been the soundtrack to 1965 for the beautiful people of swinging London, but to the cognoscenti there was something even cooler to listen to."

Miles continues:

"It's in all the best homes, my dear," said Brion Gysin, and he was right. At the height of the '60s, Call Me Burroughs was an essential record. The Beatles all had copies (Paul McCartney included Bill on the sleeve of Sgt. Pepper's Lonely Hearts Club Band. Art dealer Robert Fraser bought ten copies to give to friends such as Brian Jones and Mick Jagger. Marianne Faithfull and Keith Richards' dealer had copies, as did numerous painters and writers.

McCartney, in particular was a fan:

William Burroughs's spoken-word album Call Me Burroughs was a great favourite for late-evening listening when people were stoned; Paul heard Burroughs's cold, flat Mid-Western voice reading from The Naked Lunch before he saw the book.

McCartney was so impressed by the album that he hired the producer, Ian Sommerville, to set up a studio and act as tape operator for him in an apartment Ringo Starr owned, but was not using, at 34 Montagu Place. Sommerville ended up living in the apartment, and subsequent tape experiments were conducted there by Burroughs. McCartney was said to have found all of this very interesting and relevant to his own recordings.

In his book The Old, Weird America, Greil Marcus calls the album "a talisman of cool in Greenwich Village in the mid-1960s."

== Track listing ==
All composition by William S. Burroughs

1. "Bradley the Buyer" – 6:24
2. "Meeting of International Conference of Technological Psychiatry" – 4:56
3. "The Fish Poison Con" – 6:59
4. "Thing Police Keep All Board Room Reports" – 1:25
5. "Mr. Bradley Mr. Martin Hear Us Through the Hole in Thin Air" – 4:16
6. "Where You Belong" – 6:38
7. "Inflexible Authority" – 10:45
8. "Uranian Willy" – 1:59

Tracks 1 and 2 from Naked Lunch; 3, 4, 5, 7, and 8 from Nova Express; track 6 from The Soft Machine.

== Personnel ==
- William Burroughs – voice
- Harriet Crowder – cover photo
- Rachel Gutek – design
- Tient Louw – cover design
- Ian Sommerville – engineering
- Jean-Jacques Lebel – liner notes
- Emmett Williams – liner notes
- Tony Balch – photography
- Brion Gysin – photography

Re-release

- Barry Alfonso – liner notes
- James Austin – reissue supervision
- Bob Fisher/Digital Domain – remastering
- James Grauerholz – reissue supervision, photography
- Barry Miles – liner notes
- Gary Peterson – reissue assistance
- Coco Shinomiya – reissue art direction
- Joseph Zinnato – photography
