= Terminal (Asunción) =

Coordinates: 25°20′S 57°36′W

- Barrio
- Interactive map of Terminal
- Country: Paraguay
- Capital District: Asunción

Area
  - Total: 0.75 km^{2} (0.29 sq mi)
- Elevation: 43 m (141 ft)

Population (2022)
  - Total: 3,690

Terminal is a neighbourhood (barrio) of Asunción, Paraguay. Its name is given by the fact that the Terminal de Ómnibus de Asunción, the city's main coach terminal, is located in this neighbourhood.

== Population ==
The neighborhood has a total of 3,690 inhabitants, of whom 1,736 are men and 1,954 are women. The median age is 34 years.
