= Terminus =

Terminus may refer to:

== Ancient Rome ==
- Terminus (god), a Roman deity who protected boundary markers

== Transport ==
- Terminal train station or terminus, a railway station serving as an end destination
- Bus terminus, a bus station serving as an end destination
- Lagos Terminus railway station, the main railway station of Lagos, Nigeria

== Art, entertainment, and media ==
=== Literature ===
- Terminus (play), a 2007 play by Marl O'Rowe
- "Terminus" (poem), written in 1866 by Ralph Waldo Emerson
- Terminus (comics), a fictional character in the Marvel Universe
- Terminus (fictional planet), the home of the Foundation in Isaac Asimov's Foundation novels (1942–1993)
- Terminus, a robot in the eponymous short story from Tales of Pirx the Pilot by Polish science fiction writer Stanisław Lem

=== Film and TV ===
- Terminus (1961 film), a film directed by John Schlesinger
- Terminus (1987 film), a film directed by Pierre-William Glenn
- Terminus (2007 film), a short film directed by Trevor Cawood
- Terminus (2015 film), a film directed by Marc Furmie
- Terminus (Doctor Who), a 1983 serial in the long-running science fiction TV series Doctor Who
- Terminus, fictional city location in The Signal (2007 film)
- Terminus, a fictional sanctuary located in a train station, depicted in season 4 of the TV series The Walking Dead
- Terminus Series, a type of mecha in the anime series Eureka Seven
- Terminus Systems, part of the world of the Mass Effect media franchise

=== Games ===
- Terminus, music that plays while on the Void floor of The Binding of Isaac: Repentance
- Terminus (1986 video game), a space prison escape game by Mastertronic
- Terminus (2000 video game), a 2000 space-flight role-playing/action game by Vicarious Vision
- Terminus, a location in Halo 4; also an achievement when the player finds it
- Terminus is the name of the world in RPG/TBS video game Ash of Gods: Redemption
- Terminus, Aeon of Finality in Honkai: Star Rail

=== Music ===
- "Terminus", a song by Unwound from their 2001 album Leaves Turn Inside You
- Terminus (album), a 2013 album by Garnet Crow

== Other uses ==
- River terminus, the end of a river
- Glacier terminus, the end, or "snout," of a glacier's ice
- terminus post quem, terminus ante quem, terminus ad quem, and terminus a quo, terms used to describe the limits of a timeframe during which a historical event may have happened in archaeology
- Terminus (weevil), a beetle genus in the tribe Pentarthrini
- Terminus, the unofficial original name of Atlanta, Georgia, United States
  - Terminus (office complex), an office complex in Atlanta
- Leonard Rose (hacker), a.k.a. "Terminus", convicted hacker
- "Terminus", a finishing move of professional wrestler Damien Sandow

== See also ==
- Terminal (disambiguation)
- Terminator (disambiguation)
- Termini (disambiguation)
