= Last Words: The Final Journals of William S. Burroughs =

Collection of works by William S. Burroughs II

- First edition (US)
- Author: William S. Burroughs
- Language: English
- Genre: autobiography
- Publisher: Grove Press (US); Flamingo (UK)
- Publication date: 2000
- Publication place: United States
- Media type: Print (Hardcover and Paperback)

Last Words: The Final Journals of William S. Burroughs is a collection of diary entries made by Beat Generation author William S. Burroughs between November 16, 1996, and July 30, 1997, only a few days before his death on August 2 at the age of 83. The collection was first published in hardcover by Grove Press in 2000 and was edited by Burroughs' longtime assistant, James Grauerholz.

This final collection of writings by Burroughs was transcribed from mostly hand-written journal entries that were often difficult to decipher. Burroughs chronicles his thoughts about his approaching mortality, particularly in the wake of the death of his longtime friend Allen Ginsberg on April 5, 1997, and the passing of several beloved pets. He also expresses his feelings about political issues of the day such as the war on drugs, and mentions being wryly amused at living in one of the cities destroyed by nuclear weapons in the TV movie The Day After (1983).

His final entry describes love as "the most natural painkiller what there is."

The book concludes with a section of annotations by Grauerholz describing events in Burroughs' life at the time of the journal entries, along with explanations for some references and people mentioned in the entries.

Several of these journal entries, including his last one, were initially published in a 1998 issue of The New Yorker.

Grove Press, the publishers of the book, had a long history with Burroughs dating back to the early 1960s when they published the first North American edition of Naked Lunch, sparking a landmark obscenity case.
