= The Cat Inside =

Novel by William S. Burroughs

- First edition
- Author: William S. Burroughs
- Illustrator: Brion Gysin
- Language: English
- Genre: Autobiographical
- Publisher: Grenfell Press
- Publication date: 1986
- Publication place: United States
- Media type: Print (Hardcover and Paperback)
- ISBN: 0-670-84465-9 (1992 edition)
- OCLC: 25201207
- Dewey Decimal: 813/.54 B 20
- LC Class: PS3552.U75 Z464 1992

The Cat Inside is an autobiographical novella written by William S. Burroughs and illustrated by Brion Gysin. The book was first published by Grenfell Press in 1986 in an edition of only 133 copies; it was later reissued by Viking Press in 1992 in a mass market hardcover edition.

In the book Burroughs, a noted lover of cats, reminisces about the many cats in his life. Gysin, a frequent collaborator with Burroughs dating back to the early 1960s, died in 1986, making this possibly the last work he did with Burroughs. Gysin is also referenced by name in the text.

Burroughs reads excerpts from the novella, "Kill the Badger!" and "Warning to Young Couples", on the albums Dead City Radio (1990) and Spare Ass Annie and Other Tales (1993).
