= Thanksgiving (disambiguation) =

Thanksgiving is a national holiday celebrated primarily in Canada and the United States.

Thanksgiving or Thanksgiving Day may also refer to:

- Thanksgiving (Canada)
- Thanksgiving (United States)

== Film ==
- Thanksgiving (2004 film), a 2004 short film
- "Thanksgiving", a fake trailer in Grindhouse
- Thanksgiving (2023 film), a 2023 feature adaptation of the Grindhouse trailer

== Music ==
- Thanksgiving (band), a moniker used by Adrian Orange
- "Thanksgiving", a song by Kevin Roth from the Shining Time Station episode Billy's Party
- "Thanksgiving Day", a song by Do As Infinity from Minus V

== Television episodes ==
- "Thanksgiving" (Arrow)
- "Thanksgiving" (Brooklyn Nine-Nine)
- "Thanksgiving" (Family Guy)
- "Thanksgiving" (Friday Night Lights)
- "Thanksgiving" (Glee)
- "Thanksgiving" (Heroes)
- "Thanksgiving" (Master of None)
- "Thanksgiving" (Scream Queens)
- "Thanksgiving" (That '70s Show)
- "Thanksgiving (Canada)" (Yellowjackets)

== Other uses ==
- Thanksgiving (novel), a book by Michael Dibdin

== See also ==
- Gratitude, for the idea of thanksgiving generally
- Labor Thanksgiving Day, a Japanese national holiday on November 23 celebrating cooperation between labor and production
- NFL on Thanksgiving Day, a series of American football games played on Thanksgiving Day in the United States
- Songs of thanksgiving, a series of daily prayers in Judaism
- Candle of Gratitude, also known as the Thanksgiving Candle, a monument in the Republic of Moldova
- Thanksgiving Day Classic, a series of Canadian football games played on Thanksgiving Day in Canada
- Thanksgiving offering, an offering historically made in the Jewish temple
- Victory and Homeland Thanksgiving Day, a Croatian national holiday on August 5 as a memorial to its War of Independence
