= Interzone (book) =

Collection of short stories by William S. Burroughs

- First edition
- Author: William S. Burroughs
- Language: English
- Publisher: Viking Press
- Publication date: 1989
- Publication place: United States
- Media type: Print (hardback & paperback)
- Pages: 194
- ISBN: 0-670-81347-8

Interzone is a collection of short stories and other early works by William S. Burroughs from 1953 to 1958. The collection was first published by Viking Penguin in 1989, although several of the stories had already been printed elsewhere, including an earlier publication titled Early Routines. The title was inspired by the International Zone in Tangiers, Morocco, where Burroughs lived for a time and by which he was greatly influenced.

A notable inclusion is "Twilight's Last Gleamings", written in 1938 in collaboration with childhood friend Kells Elvins, and widely thought to be Burroughs' first attempt at fiction. The villain of the piece, Doctor Benway, was to play a pivotal role in Naked Lunch. (This story differs from another Burroughs piece titled "Twilight's Last Gleamings," which was published in the 1970s collection, Exterminator!.)

Interzone features many characters and concepts that would manifest themselves in Naked Lunch, Nova Express and others. At one point, Interzone was considered as a title for Naked Lunch. Moreover, the concluding section entitled "WORD" was part of the original Naked Lunch manuscript but was cut during the editing process (according to the introduction by editor James Grauerholz).

Several of the short pieces were adapted into other media. Burroughs recorded the stories "The Junky's Christmas" and "Spare Ass Annie," which were set to music and released on the album Spare Ass Annie and Other Tales. "The Junky's Christmas" was also adapted as an animated film in the 1990s.

== Contents ==
The book is divided into three sections:

=== Part 1: Stories ===
1. Twilight's Last Gleamings (a different piece from the one in the earlier collection, Exterminator!)
2. The Finger
3. Driving Lesson
4. The Junky's Christmas
5. Lee and the Boys
6. In the Cafe Central
7. Dream of the Penal Colony
8. International Zone

=== Part 2: Lee's Journals ===
1. Lee's Journals
2. An Advertising Short for Television
3. Antonio the Portuguese Mooch
4. Displaced Fuzz
5. Spare Ass Annie
6. The Dream Cops
7. The Conspiracy
8. Iron Wrack Dream
9. Ginsberg Notes (a reference to Allen Ginsberg)

=== Part 3: WORD ===
As noted above, this is a novella-length story that was originally part of the Naked Lunch manuscript when it was entitled Interzone.
