= Bob Salpeter =

American graphic designer (1935–2024)

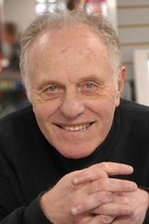
- Bob Salpeter
- Born: 16 October 1935; Bronx, New York, U.S.
- Died: 8 September 2024 (aged 88); Manhattan, New York, U.S.
- Occupation: Graphic designer

Bob Salpeter (October 16, 1935 – September 8, 2024) was an American graphic designer.

== Education and early career ==
Bob Salpeter studied at the School of Industrial Art (1949–1953) and the School of Visual Arts in New York (1956–1958).

Salpeter worked at various design firms including Ben Lorenz Associates and the Bureau of Advertising before working for IBM (1960–1971) designing product literature and exhibits. With Arthur Appel in 1971, he programmed an IBM 360 to produce the first known computer-generated origami. At IBM, he was mentored by Paul Rand.

In 1972, Salpeter joined with Dick Lopez and founded Lopez Salpeter Design, producing a wide variety of graphic and exhibit design projects including the Human Variation Exhibition at The American Museum of Natural History and the History of Golf exhibit, at the World Golf Hall of Fame.

In 1979, he formed Salpeter Design now Salpeter Ventura working on design projects for clients such as IBM, Sony, American Express, and many financial companies such as Federated, Merrill Lynch, Oppenheimer Funds, and Goldman Sachs.

Salpeter died on September 8, 2024, at the age of 88.

== Teaching ==
Salpeter taught Graphic Communication at Pratt Institute (1985–2005).

== Awards ==
He has received numerous design awards from the American Institute of Graphic Arts, the Art Directors Club of New York, Type Directors Club and Design International in Paris, among others.
