= Terminus (poem) =

Poem written by Ralph Waldo Emerson

"Terminus" is a poem written by Ralph Waldo Emerson. It was published in May-Day and Other Pieces, his second collection of poetry after Poems. The poem reflects Emerson's status as a transcendentalist and is primarily composed of couplets and triplets.

In the poem, Emerson comments on the inevitability of old age and the harsh certainty of death. Emerson makes this point by invoking the name Terminus, the Roman god of endings and boundaries—this makes the god thematically relevant to the poem. Unlike the Grim Reaper, the character of Terminus is a personification of time as a natural restriction.

== Text ==
It is time to be old,

To take in sail:—

The god of bounds,

Who sets to seas a shore,

Came to me in his fatal rounds,

And said: “No more!

No farther shoot

Thy broad ambitious branches, and thy root.

Fancy departs: no more invent;

Contract thy firmament

To compass of a tent.

There’s not enough for this and that,

Make thy option which of two;

Economize the failing river,

Not the less revere the Giver,

Leave the many and hold the few.

Timely wise accept the terms,

Soften the fall with wary foot;

A little while

Still plan and smile,

And,—fault of novel germs,—

Mature the unfallen fruit.

Curse, if thou wilt, thy sires,

Bad husbands of their fires,

Who, when they gave thee breath,

Failed to bequeath

The needful sinew stark as once,

The Baresark marrow to thy bones,

But left a legacy of ebbing veins,

Inconstant heat and nerveless reins,—

Amid the Muses, left thee deaf and dumb,

Amid the gladiators, halt and numb.”

As the bird trims her to the gale,

I trim myself to the storm of time,

I man the rudder, reef the sail,

Obey the voice at eve obeyed at prime:

“Lowly faithful, banish fear,

Right onward drive unharmed;

The port, well worth the cruise, is near,

And every wave is charmed.”
