= Ah Pook Is Here =

Work by William S. Burroughs and Malcolm Mc Neill

First edition (publ. John Calder)

Ah Pook Is Here was a collaboration between author William S. Burroughs and artist Malcolm Mc Neill. It began in 1970, when Burroughs was living in London and Mc Neill was in his final year of art school. It first appeared under the title The Unspeakable Mr. Hart as a comic strip in the English Cyclops. When that magazine ceased publication, Burroughs and Mc Neill decided to develop the concept as a book.

After a year of research and preliminary design the text of the book had expanded from 11 pages to 50, and a complete mockup had been produced. By this point, the work had been renamed Ah Puch Is Here in reference to the Mayan Death God. Straight Arrow Books in San Francisco agreed to publish the proposed work in 1971 as a "Word/Image novel" which was to comprise 120 pages, some of integrated text and image, some of text alone and some which featured only pictures.

In 1973, Mc Neill moved to San Francisco from London to finish the project. However, the small advance offered by the publisher made any more than a few months of working full-time on the project impossible, and when Straight Arrow closed in 1974 the book was without a publisher. Nevertheless, Mc Neill moved to New York in 1975 to rejoin Burroughs and continue the work. They were unable to find another publisher and after seven years on and off, the project was finally abandoned. It was subsequently published in 1979 (by John Calder and Viking Penguin) in text form only under the original title of Ah Pook Is Here.

After 30 years the original visual works were resurrected and restored by Mc Neill for a West Coast showing at Track 16 Gallery in Santa Monica, CA, April 4th to May 2nd, 2009 and a December 2008 showing in New York at Saloman Arts Gallery.

Burroughs reads from Ah Pook Is Here on his 1990 recording Dead City Radio; this recording, in turn, formed the soundtrack to the animated short Ah Pook Is Here directed by Philip Hunt and featured music by John Cale.
