= Terminal (Danish band) =

Danish alternative rock band

terminal
- Origin: Copenhagen, Denmark
- Genres: Rock, pop, alternative rock
- Years active: 2007–present
- Label: Trechoma Records
- Members: Thorsten Bæk; Henrik Engstrøm; Rasmus Ilsø
- Website: www.terminal.nu

terminal (commonly spelled with a lowercase "t") is a Danish rock/pop act from Denmark formed in 2007. Their music has been described as grunge and alternative pop/rock. The group consists of Thorsten Bæk (lead vocals, guitar), Henrik Engstrøm (backing vocals, bass) and Rasmus Ilsø (drums).

== History ==
The band met in high school and played under various names throughout their time there playing support gigs for Danish commercial acts such as Kellermensch, Oh No Ono and Nordstrøm. After being on tours with different bands for a couple of years, Thorsten, Henrik and Rasmus formed terminal at their final year, ready to write and perform their own material.

During the first few months of 2007, terminal toured and wrote and recorded several demo songs. Danish independent label Trechoma Records went into dialogue with the band in the middle of 2007 and six months later terminal signed their very first contract deal, a deal that assured terminal's debut album to hit the entire European market.

=== Career ===
On 14 April 2009, terminal's debut album Bring Forth the Few was released in Denmark to critical acclaim. With 4 and 5 out of 6 stars, the band went on tour in the summer and fall of 2009, headlining festivals and playing sold out gigs. On 17 April, the album hit the European market - and the critics were aroused yet again, giving top stars to the young band from Denmark.

In the summer of 2010, terminal was featured on the mtvU show "The Freshmen", where the winner goes into television rotation on MTVu, with the music video for their debut single "Chasing Light". Being the only foreign band in the competition, and competing against established indie bands such as Free Energy and Hypernova, terminal managed to gain a lot of attention. The band was in first place of the vote until two days before it closed, and when the vote closed terminals music video for their debut single "Chasing Light" was placed 2nd. Despite the defeat terminal still went into television rotation on MTVu. The reason was that the band gained a massive amount of traffic on the site, being placed No. 1 on "Most Viewed of This Week", No. 3 on "Most Viewed of This Month" and No. 1 on The Most Commented of This Week". In addition, terminal got over 10.000 views on their video over the first couple of days. "Chasing Light" the music video went into television rotation on MTVu and on the Danish television programme Boogie TV and was featured on VH1.com, Spike.com, Frequency.com and GAFFA.tv. The single went into rotation on several Danish radio stations, including the Danish national radio broadcasting DR.

In the late fall of 2010, terminal recorded the EP Ignite the World - The EP at Bad Coffee Studios in Copenhagen. The EP was released digitally worldwide on 26 January 2011. It consists of four tracks: "Rise and Sing", "Waiting For", "Look at Me Now" and "I Can't Die".

Terminal recorded music videos for "Waiting For" and "Rise and Sing", which both aired on mtvU and was added to mtv.com.

Ignite the World - The EP was well received and was featured on several radio stations worldwide.

Terminal released two singles in 2012, "My Chemical" and "Together We Are One". Both were released digitally on iTunes, Spotify and other online services. The band made both singles available for free through vinyl.com.

== MTV and Los Angeles ==
Terminal went to Los Angeles in November 2010 to perform showcases for the recording industry and was invited, as the first Danish music group ever, to play an acoustic showcase at the MTV headquarters in Santa Monica. After signing deals with a music lawyer and a music supervisor and having played showcases for record labels including Universal, American Recordings and Atlantic Records, the band returned to Denmark a couple of weeks later.

Terminal signed with the Los Angeles-based management firm Million Dollar Management in the fall of 2010. In 2011, terminal discontinued the contract with Million Dollar Management.

== Discography ==
Release date	Single / album name
March 2009 (Trechoma Records)	"Chasing Light"
April 2009 (Trechoma Records)	Bring Forth the Few
January 2011 (terminal music)	"Waiting For"
January 2011 (terminal music)	Ignite the World - The EP
March 2012 (terminal music)	"My Chemical"
May 2012 (terminal music)	"Together We Are One"

=== Music videos ===
- 2010: "Chasing Light"
- 2011: "Waiting For"
- 2011: "Rise and Sing"
- 2011: "Rise and Sing (acoustic version)"
- 2012: "My Chemical (acoustic version)"
