= Ralph Hayes (author) =

American author

Ralph Hayes is an American author of action-adventure, espionage, crime-fiction and western paperbacks. The magazines his work has appeared in include Alfred Hitchcock Mystery Magazine. The Michigan native has had nearly 100 books published over the course of five decades. Most of his literary work features exotic locations based on his international traveling. In a 2019 interview, Hayes explained that his wife (now deceased) was a successful artist and her work was in exhibits throughout the U.S. and Europe. Following her artistic career, Hayes was able to visit South Africa, Morocco, Peru, Hong Kong and Egypt and used those experiences in his storytelling.

== Biography ==
=== 1960s ===
After departing from a law practice, Ralph Hayes began authoring stories and full-length novels in 1969. His earliest published work was a short story titled "The Gumdrop Affair", which was featured in a 1967 issue of Alfred Hitchcock Mystery Magazine.

=== 1970s ===
Beginning in 1970, Ralph Hayes released the first of many western novels featuring protagonist O'Brien. Known as the "Buffalo Hunter" series, Hayes authored six installments in the 1970s. These were published by a combination of Belmont Tower, Lenox Hill and Manor. Hayes contributed installments in the "Nick Carter: Killmaster" series from 1972 to 1974. These books were authored under the house name Nick Carter. From 1974 to 1975, Hayes wrote the six-volume spy-fiction series titled "Agent of Cominsec" published by Belmont Tower. During the period of 1975–1976, Hayes authored the six-book team-combat series entitled "Check Force" for the Manor publishing house. Hayes wrote "The Hunter" vigilante series, often referred to as the name "John Yard", for Belmont Tower in 1975. Later, from 1976 to 1978, Hayes wrote the four-volume adventure series called "Stoner" for Manor. During the two-year period of 1977–1978, Hayes authored six novels in the military fiction series "Soldier of Fortune" for publisher Belmont Tower. These were written under the name Peter McCurtin, a prolific author of men's action-adventure novels, westerns and mystery-thrillers. In addition to the many series' he contributed to, Hayes also authored 15 stand-alone novels of crime-fiction and action-adventure for publishers such as Zebra, Jove and Leisure.

=== 1980s ===
Citing a publishing decline, Hayes reduced his literary output in the 1980s. Before returning full-time to his law practice, Hayes wrote 11 stand-alone novels for publishers like Leisure and Zebra between 1980 and 1984. He also authored one installment of the "Buffalo Hunter" series in 1984 as well as one volume of "Soldier of Fortune" in 1985.

=== 1990s ===
Returning to his writing career in the 1990s, Hayes focused solely on the western-fiction genre. He authored two stand-alone westerns between 1992 and 1993 for the publisher Pinnacle. He also contributed to the "Buffalo Hunter" series with one installment authored in 1992 for Pinnacle. As house name Dodge Tyler, Hayes wrote the first six volumes of the 12-book series "Daniel Boone: Lost Wilderness Tales" released by Leisure.

=== 2000s ===
Again, centralizing his writing within the western-fiction genre, Hayes authored three more installments of the "Buffalo Hunter" series from 2013 to 2015. He wrote six stand-alone western books between 2016 and 2019. All of Hayes' 2000s literary work has been solely published by the imprint Black Horse Westerns, owned by The Crowood Press.

== Influences ==
In a 2019 Paperback Warrior interview, Hayes says lists his favorite writers as Ernest Hemingway, Jane Austen, John Le Carre and B. Traven.

== Bibliography ==
=== Agent of Cominsec ===
1. The Bloody Monday Conspiracy - 1974 Belmont Tower
2. The Doomsday Conspiracy - 1974 Belmont Tower
3. The Turkish Mafia Conspiracy - 1974 Belmont Tower
4. The Hellfire Conspiracy - 1974 Belmont Tower
5. The Nightmare Conspiracy - 1974 Belmont Tower
6. The Deathmakers Conspiracy - 1975 Belmont Tower

=== The Buffalo Hunter ===
1. Gunslammer (aka Secret of Sulpher Creek) - 1970 Belmont Tower
2. Four Ugly Guns - 1970 Belmont Tower
3. The Name is O'Brien - 1972 Lenox Hill
4. Hellohole - 1973 Leisure/Belmont Tower
5. Treasure of Rio Verde - 1974 Remploy
6. Vengeance is Mine - 1978 Manor
7. Five Deadly Guns - 1984 Ulverscroft
8. Revenge of the Buffalo Hunter - 1992 Pinnacle
9. The Last Buffalo - 2013 Black Horse
10. Fort Revenge - 2013 Black Horse
11. Coyote Moon - 2015 Black Horse

=== Check Force ===
1. 100 Megaton Kill - 1975 Manor
2. Clouds of War - 1975 Manor
3. Judgment Day - 1975 Manor
4. The Peking Plot - 1975 Manor
5. Seeds of Doom - 1976 Manor
6. Fires of Hell - 1976 Manor

=== Daniel Boone: Lost Wilderness Tales ===
1. River Run Red (as Dodge Tyler) - 1996 Leisure
2. Algonquin Massacre (as Dodge Tyler) - 1996 Leisure
3. Death at Spanish Wells (as Dodge Tyler) - 1996 Leisure
4. Winter Kill (as Dodge Tyler) - 1996 Leisure
5. Apache Revenge (as Dodge Tyler) - 1997 Leisure
6. Death Trail (as Dodge Tyler) - 1997 Leisure

=== The Hunter ===
1. Scavenger Kill - 1975 Leisure/Belmont Tower
2. Night of the Jackals - 1975 Leisure/Belmont
3. A Taste for Blood - 1975 Leisure/Belmont Tower
4. The Track of the Beast - 1975 Leisure/Belmont Tower
5. The Deadly Prey - 1975 Leisure/Belmont Tower

=== Nick Carter: Killmaster ===
- The Cairo Mafia - 1972 Award
- Assault on England - 1972 Award
- The Omega Terror - 1972 Award
- Strike Force Terror - 1972 Award
- Butcher of Belgrade - 1973 Award
- Agent Counter-Agents - 1973 Award
- Assassin: Code Name Vulture - 1974 Award
- Vatican Vendetta (with George Snyder) - 1974 Award

=== Soldier of Fortune (as Peter McCurtin) ===
- The Guns of Palembang - 1977 Belmont Tower
- First Blood - 1977 Belmont Tower
- Ambush at Derati Wells - 1977 Belmont Tower
- Operation Hong Kong - 1977 Belmont Tower
- Body Count - 1977 Belmont Tower
- Battle Pay - 1978 Belmont Tower
- Blood Island - 1985 Leisure

=== Stoner ===
1. The Golden God - 1976 Manor
2. Satan Stone - 1976 Manor
3. All That Glitters - 1977 Manor
4. King's Ransom - 1978 Manor

=== Stand Alone Works ===
- The Wayward August of Virgie Tats
- Black Day at Diablo
- The Visiting Moon - 1971 Lenox Hill
- Treasure of Rio Verde - 1974 Remploy
- Love's Dark Conquest - 1978 Leisure
- Forbidden Splendor - 1978 Leisure
- Dark Water - 1978 Leisure
- By Passion Possessed - 1978 Leisure
- The Killing Ground - 1978 Leisure
- Savage Dawn - 1979 Jove
- The Big Fall - 1979 Zebra
- Hostages of Hell - 1979
- Adventuring - 1979 Jove
- Golden Passion - 1979 Leisure
- Dragon's Fire - 1979 Leisure
- The Promised Land - 1980 Leisure
- The Sea Runners - 1981 Leisure
- A Sudden Madness - 1981 Leisure
- Last View of Eden - 1981 Leisure
- Charleston - 1982 Zebra
- Drought! - 1982 Zebra
- The God Game - 1983 Leisure
- The Scorpio Cipher - 1983 Leisure
- Sheryl - 1984 Leisure
- Deadly Reunion - 1984 Leisure
- Illegal Entry - 1984 Leisure
- Mountain Man's Fury - 1992 Pinnacle
- Mountain Man's Gold - 1993 Pinnacle
- Tombstone Vendetta - 2010 Black Horse
- Texas Vengeance - 2016 Black Horse
- Rawhide Justice - 2016 Black Horse
- Lawless Breed - 2017 Black Horse
- The Way of the Gun - 2018 Black Horse
- Wanted: Dead or Alive - 2019 Black Horse
