= My Education: A Book of Dreams =

1995 novel by William S. Burroughs

- First edition
- Author: William S. Burroughs
- Language: English
- Publisher: Viking Press
- Publication date: January 1995
- Media type: Print (Hardcover and Paperback)
- Pages: 193 pp
- ISBN: 0-670-81350-8
- OCLC: 30109272
- Dewey Decimal: 813/.54 20
- LC Class: PS3552.U75 M9 1995

My Education: A Book of Dreams (1995) (ISBN 0-14-009454-7) is the final novel by William S. Burroughs to be published before his death in 1997. It is a collection of dreams, taken from various decades, along with a few comments about the war on drugs and paragraphs created with the cut-up technique. The book is dedicated to Michael Emerton (January 18, 1966 - November 4, 1992).

== Explanation of the novel's title ==
The title is explained in the very first dream, dated 1959: Burroughs is trying to board an airplane, but a woman at the ticket counter "with the cold waxen face of an intergalactic bureaucrat" refuses him passage, informing him, "You haven't had your education yet."

== Plot summary ==
Most of the dreams are concerned with mundane affairs: talking to his friends Ian Sommerville, Allen Ginsberg and Brion Gysin; protecting his cats; trying to get sex, drugs or something to eat. There are flying dreams, erotic suitcase-packing dreams, dreams of being bullied by men in uniforms. There are references to strange drugs such as "Jade" and "Bogomolets Anti-Human Serum 125." In addition, there are other segments which seem unconcerned with dreams at all, such as a chapter where Burroughs instructs the reader on how to create botulism. There is a place he refers to as the Land of the Dead, which, like Interzone, seems to be a conglomeration of many cities: Tangiers, London, Paris, and others.
