= Tornado Alley (book) =

1989 book by William S. Burroughs

- 1989 Cherry Valley Editions paperback edition.
- Author: William S. Burroughs
- Language: English
- Publisher: Cherry Valley Editions
- Publication date: 1989
- Publication place: United States
- Media type: Print (paperback)
- ISBN: 0-916156-84-2
- OCLC: 17842421
- Dewey Decimal: 813/.54 19
- LC Class: PS3552.U75 T67 1989

Tornado Alley is a collection of short stories and one poem by Beat Generation author William S. Burroughs, written during the later years of his career and first published in 1989. The first edition of the book included illustrations by S. Clay Wilson.

Notable pieces in the collection include the poem "Thanksgiving Day, Nov. 28, 1986" and the crime melodrama "Where He Was Going", both of which are read by Burroughs on his album Dead City Radio. According to Burroughs in his spoken introduction to "Where He Was Going" on the album, the latter was inspired by Ernest Hemingway's "The Snows of Kilimanjaro" with the title a quotation from the earlier story. A music video for "Thanksgiving Day" was also produced to promote its inclusion on the album.

The collection is dedicated to John Dillinger, "in hope that he is still alive". Burroughs recites this dedication at the start of his Dead City Radio recording of the "Thanksgiving Day" poem, retitled "A Thanksgiving Prayer" for the album.

William Edward Hummel described Tornado Alley as "rife with conflicts over race and sexual identity," in a way that "illustrates how a 'minority' subject-position is not synonymous with heightened political or moral consciousness." The stories depict interwoven crimes perpetrated both by and against members of various marginalized communities, muddling distinctions between innocence and guilt.

== Contents ==
- Thanksgiving Day, Nov. 28, 1986 (poem)
- Jerry and the Stockbroker
- To Talk for Joe the Dead
- Dead-End Reeking Street
- The FUs
- Book of Shadows
- Where He Was Going
