= Terminator =

Terminator may refer to:

== Science and technology ==
=== Genetics ===
- Terminator (genetics), the end of a gene for transcription
- Terminator technology, proposed methods for restricting the use of genetically modified plants by causing second generation seeds to be sterile

=== Astronomy ===
- Terminator (solar), a moving line that separates the illuminated side and the dark side of a planetary body
  - The lunar terminator, specifically

=== Electronics and computers ===
- Terminator (electrical), a resistor at the end of a transmission line to prevent signal reflection
- Microsoft Terminator, a program analyzer research project
- Terminator (terminal emulator), a cross-platform GPL terminal emulator
- Statement terminator, used to demarcate the end of an individual statement in a programming language

=== Military ===
- BMPT Ob'yekt 199 Ramka, armoured tracked vehicle, designed for tanks support, often nicknamed "Terminator"
- Sukhoi Su-37 Air Superiority Fighter, also called the "Terminator"

== Entertainment ==
=== Films and television ===
- Terminator (franchise), a series of science fiction films and derivative works, starring Arnold Schwarzenegger
  - The Terminator, a 1984 film by James Cameron that began the franchise
  - Terminator: Dark Fate, a 2019 film
  - Terminator: The Sarah Connor Chronicles, a 2008 TV series
  - Terminator (character), a Terminator cyborg portrayed by Arnold Schwarzenegger
  - Terminator (character concept), a fictional class of autonomous killer robots in the franchise
- The Terminators (film), a 2009 mockbuster distributed by The Asylum
- Terminator II, a 1989 unofficial sequel to and rip-off of Cameron's 1984 film
- Terminator, an elimination gameplay element in the game show Greed

=== Literature ===
- The Terminators, a 1971 novel by Berkely Mather
- The Terminators (novel), a 1975 Matt Helm novel by Donald Hamilton
- The Terminator, a novelization of the 1984 film by Shaun Hutson
- The Terminator, another novelization of the 1984 film by Randall Frakes and William Wisher Jr.

=== Music ===
- The Terminator (soundtrack), for the 1984 film
- "Terminator" (King Promise song) (2023)
- "Terminator" (1988), song by metal band Powermad
- "Terminator" (1992 track), darkcore track by Goldie
- "Terminator" (1997), song by Sevendust from the album Sevendust

=== Games ===
- Terminator (Warhammer 40,000), a type of Space Marine in the Warhammer 40,000 setting
- Many video games based on the 1984 franchise; see List of Terminator video games

=== Comics ===
- Terminator (DC Comics) or Deathstroke, a DC comic book supervillain
- Terminator (Marvel Comics), a Space Knight character in Marvel Comics
- Many works based on the 1984 franchise; see List of Terminator comics

=== Other entertainment ===
- Nikki Terminator, robot assistant of magician Rudy Coby
- Terminator, a moving city at the edge of light and dark in the planet Mercury, in Kim Stanley Robinson's novels and short stories

== People ==
- The Terminator (wrestler) (born 1964), American professional wrestler
- Arbi Barayev (born 1974–2001), Chechen warlord
- Niels Feijen, (born 1977), Dutch pool player
- Bosco Ntaganda (born c. 1973), Congolese militia leader and war criminal
- Anatoly Onoprienko (1959–2013), Ukrainian serial killer
- Tom Henke, an American baseball player
- Jeff Reardon, an American baseball player
- Ariarne Titmus (born 2000), Australian swimmer
- Hermann Maier (born 1972), nicknamed "Herminator"
- Arnold Schwarzenegger, actor

== Other uses ==
- Terminator, a cryptonym for the 2003–2004 Ford Mustang SVT Cobra pony car
- Terminator, a nickname given to the PKP class EN100
- Nike Terminator, a high-top shoe by Nike

== See also ==
- Terminaator, Estonian band
- Terminonatator, a plesiosaur genus
- Termination (disambiguation)
- Terminatrix (disambiguation)
- Terminus (disambiguation)
- Exterminator (disambiguation)
