= The Western Lands =

1987 novel by William S. Burroughs

- Cover of the 1987 Viking Press hardcover edition
- Author: William S. Burroughs
- Language: English
- Series: Cities of the Red Night trilogy
- Publisher: Viking Press
- Publication date: 1987
- Publication place: United States
- Media type: Print (hardcover and paperback)
- Pages: 258 pp
- ISBN: 0-670-81352-4
- OCLC: 15790818
- Dewey Decimal: 813/.54 19
- LC Class: PS3552.U75 W47 1987
- Preceded by: The Place of Dead Roads

The Western Lands is a 1987 novel by William S. Burroughs. The final book of the trilogy that begins with Cities of the Red Night (1981) and continues with The Place of Dead Roads (1983), its title refers to the western bank of the Nile River, which in Egyptian mythology is the Land of the Dead. Inspired by the Egyptian Book of the Dead, Burroughs explores the after-death state by means of dream scenarios, hallucinatory passages, talismanic magic, occultism, superstition, and his characteristic view of the nature of reality.

== Summary ==
The prose shifts back and forth between Burroughs' characters and episodes clearly drawn from his own life. The aging novelist William Seward Hall, who lives alone with his cats in a boxcar by the river, suffering from writer's block for nearly thirty years, is only one of his many alter egos. As is the case with most of the author's novels, The Western Lands does not follow a linear narrative. The surrealistic episodes that make up the book are often irreverent and obscene, yet imbued with Burroughs's characteristic sense of sardonic humor. Autobiographical scenes include vignettes where the author takes out evidence of paregoric prescription bottles his mother gave him to sink with a large stone at the bottom of the Lake Worth Lagoon, in Florida. The bottles were evidence his mother found in her grandson's, Burroughs' own son's, bedroom. While Burroughs is ankle deep in the water, his aged mother is stalling police investigators in her home. The novel also dives backwards into ancient history, giving the plot a perspective on death that attempts to transcend the Abrahamic religions' view of the afterlife. Burroughs acknowledges being inspired by Norman Mailer's Ancient Evenings, a 1983 novel about ancient Egypt set a thousand years before Christianity. Hasan-i Sabbah, the legendary founder of the Nizari Ismai'li sect, also known as the Hashshashin, is a major character in the book, often called by his initials (HIS). Nevertheless, there are references to contemporary culture; for instance, J. Robert Oppenheimer, Albert Einstein, Joseph Stalin and Mick Jagger all make an appearance in certain dream sequences.

== Reception ==
Despite the narrative challenge of the historical framework, the novel is often regarded as Burroughs' best late work and a gratifying culminating episode of the Cities trilogy. British author J.G. Ballard wrote in his review for Washington Post Book World that "Burroughs's visionary power, his comic genius, and his unerring ability to crack the codes that make up the life of this century are undiminished". According to The Guardian, it is his best work after Naked Lunch (1959). In his review for The New York Times, the novelist Jonathan Baumbach labels The Western Lands as "not an easy work to like" and "offers us a vision that is viscerally unpleasant and often repellent", yet he finds the work to be a success and holds the trilogy to be "a comic meditation on death". Both Baumbach and Burroughs's biographer Ted Morgan emphasize that Burroughs, in the guise of various characters, is trying to "write his way out of death".

== Recording ==
Bill Laswell's band Material collaborated with Burroughs to produce the 1989 album Seven Souls, wherein Burroughs recites passages exclusively from this book to musical accompaniment. The album was reissued in 1997 with three bonus remixes. In 1998, an additional unreleased six remixes (plus one previously released) were introduced on the album The Road To The Western Lands.
