= Ghost of Chance =

Novel by William S. Burroughs

- 1995 High Risk Books hardcover edition
- Author: William S. Burroughs
- Language: English
- Genre: Novella
- Publisher: Whitney Museum of American Art
- Publication date: 1991
- Publication place: United States
- Media type: Print (Hardcover and Paperback)
- ISBN: 1-85242-406-0 (1995 edition)
- OCLC: 33060000
- Dewey Decimal: 813/.54 20
- LC Class: PS3552.U75 G48 1995

Ghost of Chance is a novella by William S. Burroughs. The story was first published in 1991 in a special limited edition by the Library Fellows of the Whitney Museum of American Art; this was followed by a mass market hardcover edition in 1995 by High Risk Books and a paperback edition published after Burroughs' death.

The novella, primarily set in Madagascar, initially focuses on a character named Captain Mission, founder of the pirate colony Libertatia, and is described on the back cover of the 1995 edition as being "an important story about environmental devastation." Following Mission's death in the narrative, the novella moves into the present day and tells of a series of deadly viruses that plague humankind, including one that causes people to believe they have the powers of Jesus Christ and another that causes uncontrollable hair growth. The narrative also switches to discussing the real-life endangerment of lemurs in Madagascar and the story ends with the author requesting readers donate to the Duke University Primate Center.

Burroughs' longtime collaborator Brion Gysin, who died several years before the book was published, is referenced by name several times, and the book includes a brief narrative segment that Burroughs had recorded for his 1990 album Dead City Radio under the title "Brion Gysin's All-Purpose Bedtime Story."
