= The Place of Dead Roads =

Novel by William S. Burroughs

- Cover of the hardcover edition by Viking Press
- Author: William S. Burroughs
- Language: English
- Series: Cities of the Red Night trilogy
- Publisher: Viking Press
- Publication date: 1983
- Publication place: United States
- Media type: Print (Hardcover and Paperback)
- Pages: 306 pp
- ISBN: 0-03-070416-2
- OCLC: 9489103
- Dewey Decimal: 813/.54 19
- LC Class: PS3552.U75 P54 1983
- Preceded by: Cities of the Red Night
- Followed by: The Western Lands

The Place of Dead Roads is a 1983 novel by William S. Burroughs, the second book of the trilogy that begins with Cities of the Red Night (1981) and concludes with The Western Lands (1987). It chronicles the story of a gay gunfighter in the American West, beginning with the gunfighter's death in 1899, incorporates contrasting themes and time travel episodes, and makes use of Burroughs’ extensive knowledge of firearms. Non-linear in construction, it makes use of vivid imagery and repetition but does not employ the famous “cut-up” method of literary collage used in his earlier novels.

The novel received a negative review from Kirkus Reviews.
