= The Adding Machine: Collected Essays =

1985 essay collection by William S. Burroughs

The Adding Machine
- First edition
- Author: William S. Burroughs
- Language: English
- Publisher: Calder Publishing
- Publication date: 1985
- Publication place: United States
- Media type: Print
- Pages: 216
- ISBN: 0714540730

The Adding Machine: Collected Essays is a collection of essays written by Beat Generation writer William S. Burroughs. This collection was first published in the United Kingdom in 1985, followed by an American edition in 1986. The subtitle for this book differs between editions: the first edition was published in the UK with the subtitle Collected Essays while the American version is subtitled Selected Essays.

The subject matter of the essays featured in this book vary widely; the pieces were written over a period of three decades. Topics include discussions about colleagues such as Jack Kerouac and Allen Ginsberg, as well as essays on other writers who influenced Burroughs such as Ernest Hemingway, Joseph Conrad and Samuel Beckett. Also included are some semi-autobiographical pieces.

The book lacks a sources or acknowledgements page to indicate where any of these essays were originally published.

The title of the book refers to the adding machine invented by the author's grandfather, William Seward Burroughs I.
