= Cities of the Red Night =

1981 novel by William S. Burroughs

- Cover of the first edition
- Author: William S. Burroughs
- Cover artist: Pieter Bruegel the Elder, The Triumph of Death, 1562
- Language: English
- Series: The Red Night trilogy
- Publisher: Holt, Rinehart & Winston (US); Calder Publishing (UK)
- Publication date: 1981
- Publication place: United States
- Media type: Print (Hardcover and Paperback)
- ISBN: 0-312-27846-2 (US Paperback)
- OCLC: 46887518
- Followed by: The Place of Dead Roads

Cities of the Red Night is a 1981 novel by American author William S. Burroughs. His first full-length novel since The Wild Boys (1971), it is part of his final trilogy of novels, known as The Red Night Trilogy, followed by The Place of Dead Roads (1983) and The Western Lands (1987). The plot involves a group of radical pirates who seek the freedom to live under the articles set out by Captain James Misson. In near present day, a parallel story follows a detective searching for a lost boy, abducted for use in a sexual ritual. The cities of the title mimic and parody real places, and Burroughs makes references to the United States, Mexico, and Morocco.

== Plot ==
The plot follows a nonlinear course through time and space. It imagines an alternate history in which Captain James Misson's Libertatia lives on. His way of life is based on The Articles, a general freedom to live as one chooses, without prejudice. The novel is narrated from two different standpoints; one set in the 18th century which follows a group of pirate boys led by Noah Blake, who land in Panama to liberate it. The other is set in the late 20th century, and follows a detective tracing the disappearance of an adolescent boy.

== Development ==
In a March 15, 1966 letter to Brion Gysin, Burroughs describes a project he was working on at the time:

My latest literary project is a tour de force. About a Chinese officer in Tibet... a description of his training in Academy 23... and what he finds in the monasteries would make a buzzard crack his carrion... deliberately using places I have never been to.

This project would become the basis of the chapter "We See Tibet with the Binoculars of the People". The phrase "we see Tibet with the binoculars of the people" first appeared in the essay "Ten Years and a Billion Dollars," in The Adding Machine, amongst a group of random phrases selected from Konstantīns Raudive's book Breakthrough. Several of those phrases became chapter titles in Cities of the Red Night.

== Reception ==
Burroughs's biographer Ted Morgan writes that one of the book's themes is "the cities themselves, imaginary cities located in the Gobi Desert 100,000 years ago, the names of which were magic words that Brion Gysin had once taught him, saying, 'If you want to get to the bottom of something, you should repeat those words before going to sleep.' Their ultimate source is the Ghāyat al-Ḥakīm, better known in the west as the Picatrix, specifically the Invocation of the Perfect Nature within that text. The city of Waghdas is in the grip of a cholera epidemic, which turns out to be a virus that is sexual in origin". Morgan notes that while this disease is similar to AIDS, the novel was written when AIDS was unheard of. Morgan concludes that Cities of the Red Night is, "certainly the most compelling and inventive of Burroughs' books since Naked Lunch."

Reviews were mixed for Cities. Novelist and critic Anthony Burgess panned the work in Saturday Review, saying Burroughs was boring readers with repetitive episodes of pederast fantasy and sexual strangulation that lacked any comprehensible world view or theology; other reviewers, like J. G. Ballard, argued that Burroughs was shaping a new literary "mythography".
