= Exterminator! =

1973 book collection by William S Burroughs

- First edition
- Author: William S. Burroughs
- Cover artist: Roy Kuhlman
- Language: English
- Publisher: Viking Press
- Publication date: 1973
- Publication place: United States
- Media type: Print (hardback & paperback)
- Pages: 168
- ISBN: 0-14-005003-5

Exterminator! is a short story collection written by William S. Burroughs and first published in 1973. Early editions label the book a novel. It is not to be confused with The Exterminator, another collection of stories Burroughs published in 1960 in collaboration with Brion Gysin.

The collection contains a number of Burroughs' most popular short pieces, such as "Twilight's Last Gleamings", "The Discipline of DE", "Wind Die, You Die, We Die", "Ali's Smile", and "The Coming of the Purple Better One". The title story is about an insect exterminator, a job Burroughs himself once held. Some of the stories, such as "Ali's Smile", had previously been published in other books and magazines such as Rolling Stone, Village Voice, Evergreen Review, and Esquire.

"Ali's Smile" was also later included in Ali's Smile/Naked Scientology. A different story entitled "Twilight's Last Gleamings" appears in the later collection, Interzone.

== Adaptations and homages ==
In the 1980s, actor Ed Asner recorded a spoken word adaptation of "Wind Die. You Die. We Die", while Burroughs and Kurt Cobain recorded a musical version of one of the stories as The "Priest" They Called Him. Certain aspects of the short story "Exterminator!" were used in the 1991 film version of Naked Lunch, with the main character William Lee (a Burroughs stand-in) holding the titular job at the film's beginning.

Al Columbia's 1994 comic book series The Biologic Show takes its title from a phrase used in the story "Short Trip Home". The passage from which the phrase originates is quoted at greater length in an eponymous short story from the comic's first issue.

== Story list ==
Exterminator! contains the following stories:

1. "Exterminator!"
2. The Lemon Kid
3. Short Trip Home
4. Davy Jones
5. The Evening News
6. Astronaut's Return
7. My Face
8. Wind Die. You Die. We Die.
9. End of the Line
10. The Drums of Death
11. "Johnny 23"
12. The Discipline of DE
13. The Perfect Servant
14. Ali's Smile
15. Twilight's Last Gleamings
16. The Coming of the Purple Better One
17. "What Washington? What Orders?"
18. From Here to Eternity
19. The Teacher
20. They Do Not Always Remember
21. Friends
22. Seeing Red
23. Old Movie
24. Electricals
25. SPUT
26. Reddies
27. The "Priest" They Called Him
28. My Legs Señor
29. The End
30. Cold Lost Marbles
