= Tales of Joujouka =

1975 book by Mohamed Hamri

- Cover of Hamri's Tales of Joujouka, Capra Press, 1975 showing Boujeloud/Pan
- Author: Mohamed Hamri
- Translator: Blanca Nyland
- Language: Maghrebi Arabic
- Publisher: Capra Press
- Publication date: 1975
- English publication date: 1975
- ISBN: 0-88496-043-9
- OCLC: 1602163
- Dewey Decimal: 398.2/0964
- LC Class: GR353.3 .H3513

Tales of Joujouka is a book by the Moroccan painter Mohamed Hamri (1932–2000) containing eight stories featuring the legends, folklore and Sufi origins myths and rituals of the Master Musicians of Joujouka. These are the stories and legends of Hamri's native village of Joujouka or Jajouka in Morocco, famous for its connections with the Beat Generation and Brian Jones, founder of the Rolling Stones.

== The Book ==
Tales of Joujouka was first published in 1975 by the Capra Press in Santa Barbara, California. The editor was Edouard Roditi. It was the last of thirty five chapbooks in a series which also included Anaïs Nin, Raymond Carver, Lawrence Durrell and Henry Miller. (The chapbook series actually had 41 titles in the series.) Hamri was the only Moroccan published in the series. It is a collection of the tales and legends of the village of Jajouka and its musicians, the Master Musicians of Joujouka. The book includes "The Legend of Boujeloud" which relates the origin myth for the Master Musicians of Joujouka and their association with the deity Pan. The story "The Cultivator with Lions and Healer of Crazy Minds" is an account of Sidi Ahmed Scheich's first encounter with the musicians ancestors c. 800 AD. He is the Sufi saint who founded the village. Translation from the original Maghrebi is by Blanca Nyland.

== Limited Edition ==
The original edition was printed with a card cover. Fifty numbered and signed hardbound copies were also published in 1975.

== New Edition ==
In 2003 The Black Eagle Press in Tangier Morocco produced a new edition of the book which contained an introduction and three extra tales.

== ISBN ==
- 0-88496-043-9 hbk.
- 0-88496-044-7 pbk.
- 0-9523838-8-8 (2003 edition)

== See also ==
- Joujouka Black Eyes
- Boujeloud
- Brion Gysin
- William S. Burroughs
- Timothy Leary
