= Joujouka Black Eyes =

Live album (field recordings) by Master Musicians of Joujouka
- Released: 1995
- Recorded: 1994
- Genres: Moroccan music, Sufi music
- Label: Sub Rosa Records
- Producer: Frank Rynne

Joujouka Black Eyes is a CD by Moroccan Sufi musicians Master Musicians of Joujouka. It was released in May 1995 on Sub Rosa Records. It was produced by Frank Rynne and includes the song "Brian Jones Joujouka very Stoned" written by Joujouka born painter Mohamed Hamri. This song commemorates the third visit of Rolling Stones founder Brian Jones to Jajouka. On this visit Jones recorded Brian Jones Presents the Pipes of Pan at Joujouka. The group on this CD includes veteran Joujouka musician Mujehid Mujdoubi (1893-1997).

== Musician credits ==
- Ahmed El Attar drum and vocal
- Mohamed El Attar lira and rhiata and vocals
- Mustapha El Attar drum
- Ahmed Bouhsini rhiata lira
- Abdelslam Boukhzar drum vocal
- Abdelslam Errtoubi rhiata and lira
- Mujehid Mujdoubi lira
- Muinier Mujdoubi drum
- Muckthar Jagdhal drum and vocal
- Mohamed Mokhchan rhiata and lira
- Abdelslam Dahnoun drum, rhiata, lira
- El Hadj clapping and vocal
- Si Ahmed violin

== Catalogue number ==
SR87
