= Mohamed Hamri =

Moroccan artist (1932–2000)

- محمد حمري
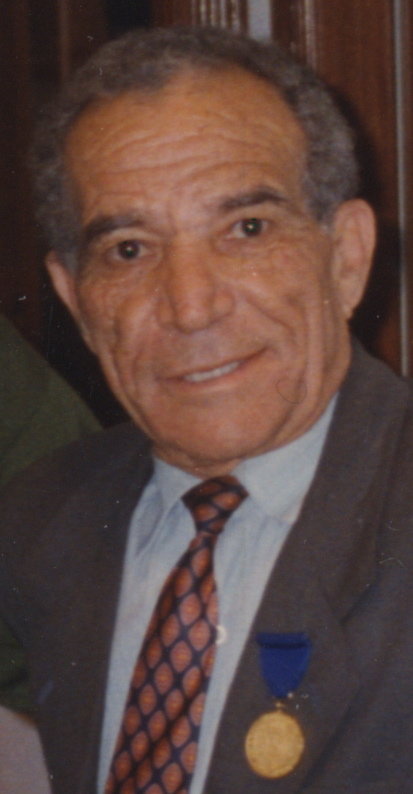
- Mohamed Hamri
- Born: August 27, 1932; Jajouka, Morocco
- Died: August 29, 2000 (aged 68)
- Occupations: Painter, author, music producer, songwriter, restauranteur
- Known for: Sufi music
- Movement: Beatnik
- Spouse: Blanca Hamri

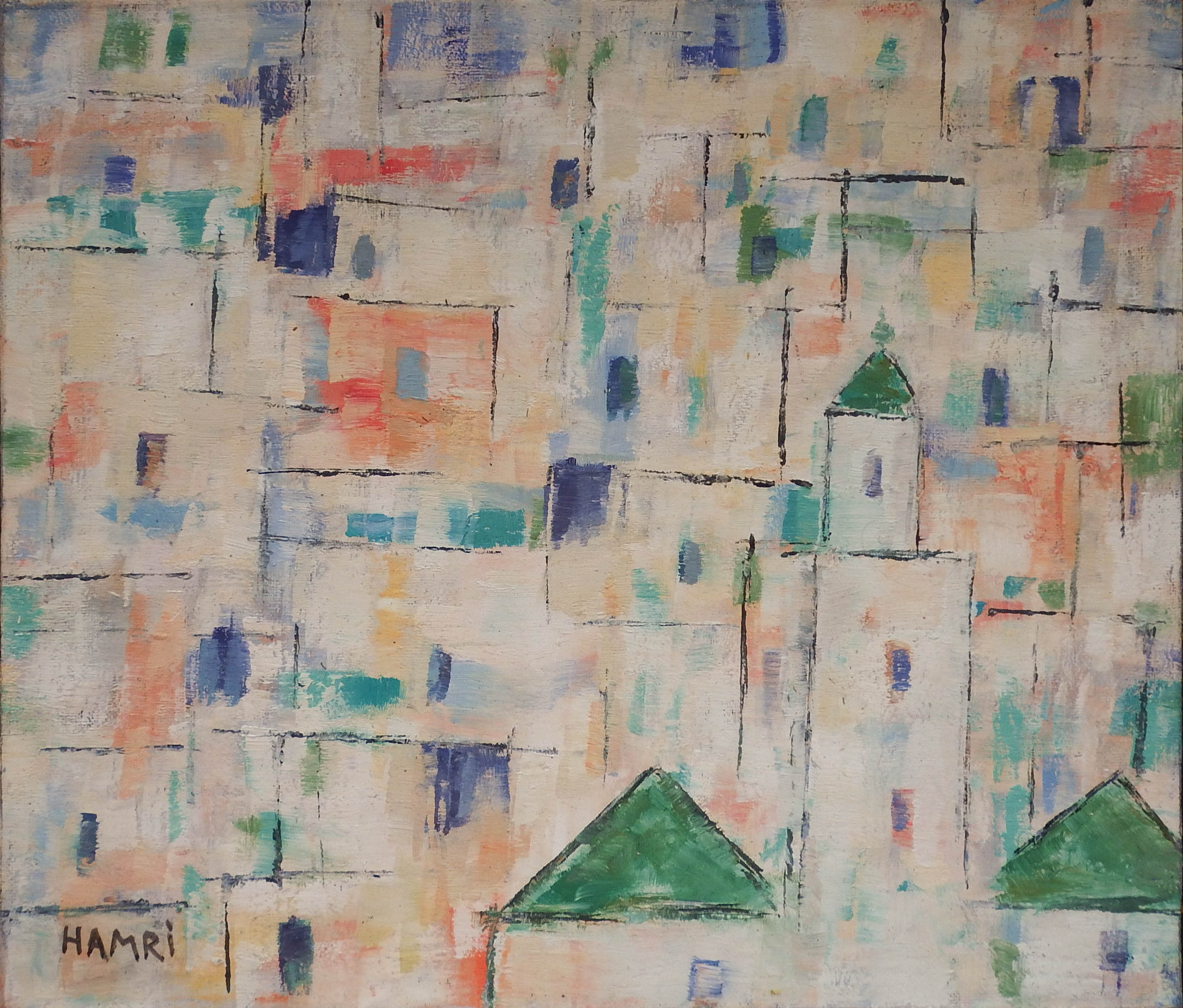
Mohamed Hamri "Tangier" Oil on canvas 30x35 cm Mohamed Hamri "Tangier" Oil on canvas 30x35 cm

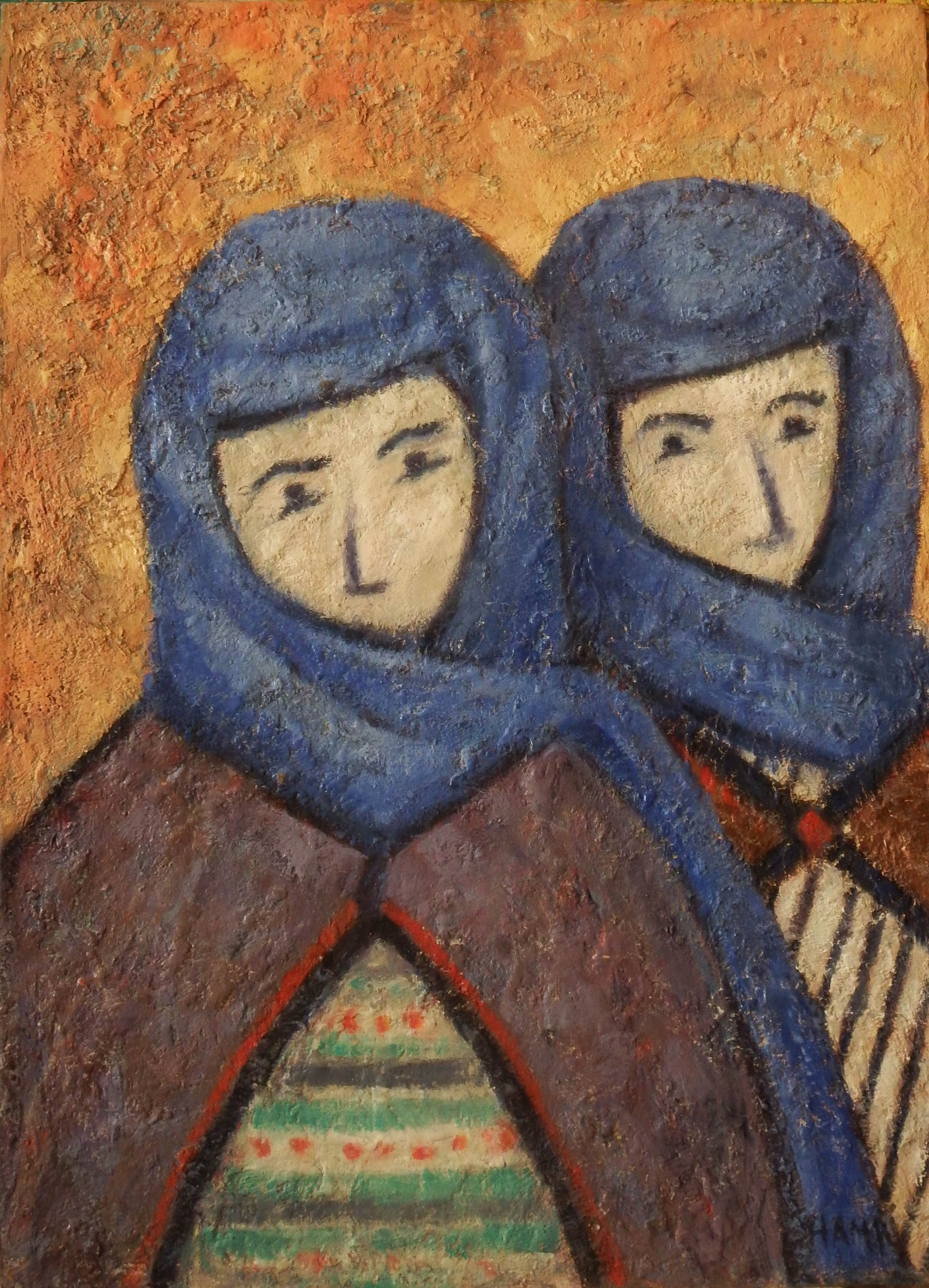
Mohamed Hamri "Characters" Oil on canvas 60x44 cm Mohamed Hamri "Composition" Oil on canvas 62x38 cm

Mohamed Hamri (Arabic: محمد حمري; August 27, 1932 – August 29, 2000), commonly known as Hamri (حمري), was a Moroccan painter, restauranteur, and author; he helped write and produce Sufi music. Self-described as "The painter of Morocco," Hamri was one of the few Moroccans to participate in the Tangier Beat scene.

== Early life and family ==
He was born in 1932 in Jajouka, a village at the southern end of the Rif Mountains near Ksar el-Kebir, in northern Morocco. His father was a ceramics artist who painted his pieces following an ancient tradition. Hamri's mother was born into the Attar family of Zahjouka musicians. His uncle was the leader of the Master Musicians of Joujouka.

Hamri is father to Sanaa Hamri, the first Moroccan woman to direct a Hollywood movie.

== Career ==
Hamri helped the Master Musicians of Joujouka survive by bringing them to Tangier to play. In 1951, writer Paul Bowles met the 18-year-old Hamri at Tanger train station.

Hamri later met the painter Brion Gysin—inventor of the cut-up technique—who tutored him and introduced him to modern European painters. Gysin and Hamri had a joint exhibition in 1952. After Hamri introduced Gysin to the Zahjouka village, Gysin became a lifelong promoter of the Sufi trance master musicians who lived there. Together with Gysin, Hamri set up the "1001 Nights Restaurant" in Tangier with Hamri as cook and where Gysin employed the master musicians to play. In 1958, Gysin bought out Hamri's interest in the restaurant for $10,000 but he soon lost the restaurant himself.

He soon opened a new 1001 Nights in Asilah—40 km south of Tangier—where he first met Brian Jones and subsequently brought him to Zahjouka.

== Meeting with Brian Jones ==
Rolling Stones founder and multi-instrumentalist Brian Jones met Hamri when he visited Morocco in 1967. They then developed a close friendship. In 1968, Gysin and Hamri took Jones to the village to record the master musicians in the ground-breaking release Brian Jones Presents the Pipes of Pan at Joujouka, whose original cover featured a painting of Jones and the Master Musicians of Joujouka by Hamri before a 1990s redesign.

In 1975, Hamri's book Tales of Joujouka, which told stories from the village, including "The Legend of Boujeloud", the half-goat/half-man creature celebrated in the annual ritual, was published by Capra Press in Santa Barbara.

Cover of Hamri's Tales of Joujouka, Capra Press, 1975 showing Boujeloud/Pan

From 1980 onwards, Hamri divided his time between Tangier and Zahjouka. After the death of Hadj Abdesalam Attar, the Master Musicians split into two factions over leadership: the Morocco-based Master Musicians of Joujouka; and the Bachir Attar-led Master Musicians of Jajouka led by Bachir Attar.

In a break from Morocco between 1974 and 1978 to pursue his painting career, Hamri published his Tales of Joujouka.

=== 1990s to 2000 ===
On his return to Morocco Hamri built a new house in Zahjouka, which became a gathering place for the musicians. Using his reputation as an artist, he invited them to shows when only he had been invited to exhibit as a painter. In 1991 he brought the group to Italy. In 1992, Hamri participated in The Here to Go Show in Dublin, Ireland. The show, a celebration of William Burroughs, Brion Gysin and the Tangier beat scene, was documented in the documentary Destroy all Rational Thought, directed by Joe Ambrose and Frank Rynne. In 1994 Hamri arranged for the Master Musicians of Joujouka to record their first CD release Joujouka Black Eyes. The recording was produced by Frank Rynne under Hamri's supervision.

Hamri had over 50 exhibitions of his paintings in Morocco, Spain, Lebanon, Canary Islands, Germany, United States, UK and Ireland during his lifetime.

He died in 2000 and is buried in the centre of the village, close to the tomb of the local Muslim saint Sidi Ahmed Sheikh. A recent retrospective was held at the Laurence-Arnott Gallery in Tangier. A large collection of his 1950s paintings has recently been discovered in the United States.

== Books ==
- Hamri is characterised as "Hamid" in Brion Gysin's novel The Process
- Tales of Joujouka is Hamri's stories from his Sufi village in Morocco.
- Man from Nowhere Storming the citadels of enlightenment with William Burroughs and Brion Gysin, by Ambrose, Rynne, Wison, features both information on and an article by Hamri.
- Clandermond, Andrew, MacCarthy Terence, Hamri the painter of Morocco, (Tangier, 2004) Biography and reproductions of Hamri art

== See also ==
- Tales of Joujouka
- Joujouka Black Eyes
