= Bujlood =

Amazigh folk celebration in Morocco

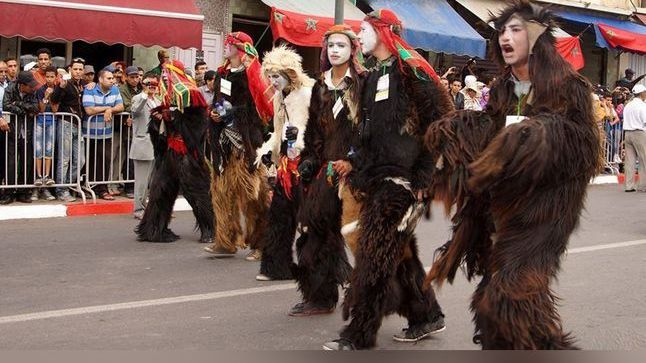
- People celebrating Boujloud in Agadir, Morocco
- Also called: Bilmawen
- Date: 11 Dhu'l-Hijja

Bujlood (Moroccan Arabic: بوجلود, romanized: Būjlūd, lit. 'father of pelts') or Bilmawen (Moroccan Arabic: بيلماون, Berber languages: ⴱⵉⵍⵎⴰⵡⵏ) is a folk Amazigh celebration observed annually after Eid al-Adha in parts of Morocco in which one person or more wears the pelt of the livestock sacrificed on Eid al-Adha.

== Etymology ==
The term Bujlood comes from the Arabic أبو abu (meaning father, or possessor) and jlood جلود (plural of jild جلد, meaning skin, leather, or pelt), so bujlood means father or possessor of skins.

The term in Tamazight is bilmaouen “ⴱⵉⵍⵎⴰⵡⵏ” . The term ilmawn means skins.

== Observance ==
The celebration begins with a bujlood carnival, usually on the day after Eid al-Adha, when young people wear masks and the skins of the sheep or goats that were sacrificed on the Eid. They dance around in their masks and costumes carrying limbs of the sacrificed animals, which they use to play with people they run into and trying to touch them. The point is to spread laughter and cheer.

It’s often seen as a “sister tradition” of the Austrian and South Tyrolean Krampus tradition. Even if they have different beliefs behind those traditions they do have similarities and are both believed to stem from pre-Christian or pre-Islamic, ancient pagan traditions. Both involve wearing animal skins, masks, and bells to represent chaotic or wild figures, also both involve a "run" or procession where the character interacts with and frightens the crowd.

== Interpretations ==
The French ethnologists Edmond Doutté and Émile Laoust connect the tradition to pre-Islamic Amazigh rites celebrating the changing of seasons and death and resurrection. The Finnish anthropologist Edvard Westermarck connected the tradition to the Roman Saturnalia festival.

The Moroccan anthropologist Abdellah Hammoudi, in his essay The Victim and Its Masks: An Essay on Sacrifice and Masquerade in the Maghreb, refutes these interpretations and contextualizes bujlood as a Moroccan cultural practice inseparable from the Eid al-Adha sacrifice.

Hassan Rachik has also written about the sacrifice traditions of the Ait Mizan and the Ait Souka in the High Atlas.

=== Islamic opinion ===
In the opinion of some local Islamic scholars, this celebration is "not permissible as it likens humans, who have been blessed by God, to beasts, and the skin of these animals defiles the human body. It also makes it impossible to pray on time, because changing in and out of the clothes takes time, and the individual in question has to wash himself in ablution after each removal of the skins, as they give off a nasty odor, especially in the summer time." It is seen by conservative Sunni scholarship as a pagan relic.

=== In popular culture ===
The Bujlood ceremony is explored in the Sufi music of the Master Musicians of Joujouka, particularly in their albums Brian Jones Presents the Pipes of Pan at Joujouka and Boujeloud.
