= Joujouka =

Joujouka may refer to:

- Jajouka or Joujouka, a village in Morocco
- Master Musicians of Joujouka a musical group from the village of Jajouka (Zahjouka) Morocco.
- Joujouka (band), a Japanese techno group
