= Boujeloud =

Studio album by Master Musicians of Joujouka
- Released: 2006
- Recorded: 1994–2000
- Genres: World music, Sufi music
- Label: Sub Rosa Records
- Producer: Frank Rynne

Boujeloud is a CD by the Moroccan Sufi musicians Master Musicians of Joujouka.

== Album details ==
It was released in September 2006 on Sub Rosa Records. It was produced by Frank Rynne under the direction of Mohamed Hamri. The group on this CD includes veteran Joujouka musician Mujehid Mujdoubi (1893–1997). The CD records the music of Boujeloud or Pan, the ancient deity still recognised in the small Moroccan village of Jajouka or Joujouka.

== Track listing ==
- 1. Boujeloud Al Boudadi 07.42
- 2. Boujeloud – (featuring Mujehid Mujdoubi). 04.30
- 3. Boujeloud / Joujouka Ei Calihoun Boujeloud / Joujouka Black Eyes. 04.30
- 4. Mali Mal Hal M'Halmaz Everyone is Together 05.48
- 5. Boujeloud Solo Drums 00.59
- 6. Boujeloud 09.06
- 7. Allah A Mohamed El Hub Tenani Allah And Mohamed – Kiss My Heart 03.23
- 8. Boujeloud 05.34
- 9. Joujouka Ei Calihoun / T`werkia D`Boujeloudia: Aishi H`liba Bab Dar Joujouka Black Eyes / Boujeloud / Wait While I Open The :Door Of The House 03.20
- 10. Jewash Halal / Tweka Miserisa 03.51

== Musician credits ==
- Ahmed El Attar — drum and vocals
- Mohamed El Attar — lira and rhiata and vocals
- Mustapha El Attar — drum
- Ahmed Bouhsini — rhiata lira
- Abdelslam Boukhzar — drum and vocals
- Abdelslam Errtoubi — rhiata and lira
- Mujehid Mujdoubi — lira
- Muinier Mujdoubi — drum
- Muckthar Jagdhal — drum and vocals
- Mohamed Mokhchan — rhiata and lira
- Abdelslam Dahnoun — drum, rhiata, and lira
- El Hadj — clapping and vocals
- Si Ahmed — violin

== Catalogue number ==
- SR243
