= Howard Coster =

British photographer (1885–1959)

- Born: 27 April 1885
- Died: 17 November 1959 (aged 74)
- Occupation: Portrait photographer

Howard Sydney Musgrave Coster (27 April 1885 – 17 November 1959) was a British photographer, opening a London studio in 1926. He was a self-styled 'Photographer of Men'.

== Collections ==
A. A. Milne with his son Christopher Robin Milne and Pooh Bear

After a childhood in the Isle of Wight, he was introduced to photography through his uncle who owned a photographic studio where Coster worked before moving to South Africa to try his hand at farming. After serving in the RAF during World War I he worked in a studio in South Africa where he met his future wife Joan Burr (1903–1974), who was also a photographer.

In 1926, on his return from South Africa with his wife, Coster opened a studio at 8 and 9 Essex Street, off the Strand. Unusually, his studio was dedicated solely to the photography of men, following the example of the American photographer Pirie MacDonald, and he became known as "the photographer of men". His business was successful from the start, and by the 1930s, Coster had undertaken several commissions for portraits including those of British royalty such as King George V as well as successful writers, including John Galsworthy, J. B. Priestley, as well as one of his most iconic images, A. A. Milne with his son Christopher Robin Milne and Pooh Bear, at Cotchford Farm, their home in Sussex.

The UK National Portrait Gallery holds five portraits of Coster, one by Eric Gill. There are over 9000 portraits by Coster in their collection, including those of G. K. Chesterton, Aldous Huxley, and the image of A. A. Milne with his son Christopher Robin mentioned above. A retrospective was held in 1985.

The exhibition catalogue said of his work:

Coster is perhaps noted for his innovative and dramatic use of lighting. Carefully judged, low-key effects illuminate character and suggest atmosphere in studies such as those of the crime writer Edgar Wallace or the oboist Leon Goossens. The quality and range of his work in this exhibition confirm Coster as one of the major photographic portraitists of his time.

Coster died in Melton in Suffolk in 1959; in his will, he left £1,124 1s to his widow, Joan Coster.
