= Brian Jones Presents the Pipes of Pan at Joujouka =

Live album by the Master Musicians of Joujouka
- Released: 8 October 1971; 26 September 1995
- Recorded: 29 July 1968, Jajouka, Morocco
- Genres: Sufi music; Moroccan folk; psychedelia; world
- Length: 40:02
- Language: Moroccan dialect
- Label: Rolling Stones Records
- Producer: Brian Jones

Brian Jones Presents the Pipes of Pan at Joujouka is an album by the Moroccan group the Master Musicians of Joujouka, released on Rolling Stones Records and distributed by Atco Records in 1971. It was produced by Brian Jones of the Rolling Stones, who recorded a performance by the group on 29 July 1968 in the village of Jajouka in Morocco. Jones called the tracks "a specially chosen representation" of music played in the village during the annual week-long Rites of Pan Festival. It was significant for presenting the Moroccan group to a global audience, drawing other musicians to Jajouka, including American composer Ornette Coleman who collaborated with the group.

The album was reissued in 1995. The executive producers were Philip Glass, Kurt Munkacsi, and Rory Johnston, with notes by Bachir Attar, Paul Bowles, William S. Burroughs, Stephen Davis, Jones, Brion Gysin, and David Silver. This deluxe album included additional graphics, more extensive notes by David Silver and Burroughs, and a second CD, produced by Cliff Mark, with two "full-length remixes."

== Background ==
The music of Jajouka became known in the West following British writer Brion Gysin and American writer Paul Bowles' documentation of their experience hearing it at a festival in Sidi-Kacem in 1950. Entranced with the music's sound, they were led to the village to hear the music in person by Moroccan painter Mohamed Hamri. Gysin, along with Hamri, later brought Brian Jones to hear the village music in 1968. The album's music included songs meant for the village's "most important religious holiday festival, Aid el Kbir". The festival's ritual of dressing a young boy dressed as "Bou Jeloud, the Goat God" wearing the "skin of a freshly slaughtered goat", involved the child's running to "spread panic through the darkened village" as the musicians played with abandon. Gysin connected the ritual, performed to protect the village's health in the coming year, to the fertility festival of Lupercalia and the "ancient Roman rites of Pan"; he referred to the Bou Jeloud dancer as "Pan" and "the Father of Skins". This name stuck, leading to the reference to Pan in the album's title.

Jones, recording engineer George Chkiantz, and Gysin travelled to the village in 1968, accompanied by Hamri and Jones' girlfriend Suki Potier to record the musicians using a portable Uher recorder. Jones worked on the two-track recordings in London, adding stereo phasing, echo, and other effects. Jones edited the full-band selection to 14 minutes by "cross-phasing fragments of a work that runs to some ninety minutes in uncut form". The album includes three types of music: repetitive vocal chants "similar to those employed throughout Islam", flute and drum music featuring "several distinct melodic motifs and improvisations over a drone" played by two flutists and several drummers, and the full village orchestra's drum and horn music played to accompany the "frenzied dance of Bou Jeloud, a Moroccan Pan".

The New York Times reviewer Robert Palmer reported that the call-and-response horn motifs are "handed down from generation to generation", noting that the "drumming rhythms are definitely African", and paraphrased Gysin as connecting the musical origins to Spain, "from the Moorish courts of Cordova and Seville". The cover illustration on the 1971 album was originally a painting by Mohamed Hamri depicting the master musicians with Brian Jones in the center. Jones edited the album and prepared the artwork together with designer and illustrator Dave Field, who also designed the Joujouka logo and painted a depiction of a carpet design on the inside cover. Jones finished producing the LP several months before his death in 1969. The album's release date was initially set for 3 September 1971, but was pushed back to 8 October.

== Legacy ==
In 1995, a CD reissue of the album was issued. It was licensed from Musidor by Point Music. A new 1990s photo of Bachir Attar, by his wife and manager American photographer, replaced Hamri's original painting of Brian Jones and the Master Musicians of Joujouka which Jones had chosen as his cover. It also included in a side bar a photo of the late Jones by Michael Cooper as well as further contemporary photos of and a "Bou Jeloud" dancer by Nutting. The CD's album title changed to Brian Jones Presents the Pipes of Pan at Jajouka to tie in with the Master Musicians of Jajouka led by Bachir Attar. The name Master Musicians of Jajouka was used on the Master Musicians of Joujouka's second album due to contract conflicts. While the original vinyl album consisted of "two untitled, unbroken LP sides", the reissue separated the songs into six tracks with titles. The reissue cut the Master Musicians of Joujouka out of their rights and resulted in international protests organized by Frank Rynne and Joe Ambrose at concerts by Bachir Attar in London, New York and San Francisco as well as Philip Glass concerts in London and elsewhere. Brion Gysin's original sleeve-notes were altered to remove all reference to the central role that Hamri played in introducing him to the music of the village. A Brion Gysin illustration decorated an essay by Paul Bowles in the liner notes. The CD's executive producers were Philip Glass, Kurt Munkacsi, and Rory Johnston. Brian Jones was credited as producer. The multi-page booklet also included reminiscences and edited essays about the original band written by Brion Gysin, (who died in 1986 and therefore was not consulted), David Silver, Stephen Davis, William S. Burroughs, Brian Jones, and Bachir Attar.

The Master Musicians of Joujouka, mentored by Hamri from the 1950s until his death in 2000, continued releasing records on Sub Rosa Records, with further releases including the acclaimed “Live in Paris”, recorded at Centre Pompidou Paris in 2016, using their original name, Master Musicians of Joujouka as used on the 1971 release and Mohamed Hamri's Tales of Joujouka. And the group the Master Musicians of Jajouka led by Bachir Attar continues to record music and now issues CDs once on their own label Jajouka Records, in addition to performing on regular tours and recording music for film scores.

In 1995, the Master Musicians of Joujouka, and Mohamed Hamri launched an international campaign demanding their interest in their recording with Brian Jones be recognised and that the re-release be withdrawn from sale until their concerns were addressed. The group led by the second youngest son of Hadj Abdesalam Attar still perform under the name Master Musicians of Jajouka led by Bachir Attar, recording the song "Continental Drift" in Tangier with the Rolling Stones for their Steel Wheels album (1989). Led by Attar's son and successor, as band leader Bachir Attar, also released soundtrack recordings under the Jajouka name and album recordings under the name Master Musicians of Jajouka Featuring Bachir Attar in the 1990s and 2000s. According to Bachir Attar the Master Musicians of that early group were led by tribal chief Hadj Abdesalam Attar. Rikki Stein who never was manager of the Master Musicians of Jajouka noted that in 1971 the leader was Hadj Abdesalam Attar. However, Berdous and Mfdal were musicians with Hadj Abdesalam Attar and Bachir Attar until their deaths in the late 1990s. This throws doubt on the claim that Hadj Abdelsalm Attar was leader, tribal or otherwise, in the late 1960s or early 1970s. However, Rikki Stein has since pointed out that there were regular elections held amongst the musicians and their supporters, who were also permitted to vote. In the late sixties and until 1971 Hadj Abdelsalam Attar was the 'Rais' (President) of the Masters, while Hamri was president of The Jahjouka Folklore Association of the Tribe Ahl Serif created collectively by the musicians of Jajouka. ´El Hadj was considered a great Jajouka musician, despite his propensity for black magic. Subsequently, though, in the early seventies elections were held and Maalim Fedal was elected Rais and continued to retain that title, certainly until the European tour organised by Rikki Stein in 1980.

== Critical legacy ==
Professional ratings
Review scores
Source	Rating
AllMusic	4.5/5 stars
Billboard	4/4 stars

The Daily Telegraph reviewer Tom Horan identified the Master Musicians as the world's first world music band and described Brian Jones Presents the Pipes of Pan at Jajouka as a "field recording that Jones subsequently retouched back in Britain using modern studio technology". He said the album "tapped perfectly into the druggy mysticism that characterised the era". Richie Unterberger of AllMusic described it as a "document of Moroccan traditional music that achieves trance-like effects through its hypnotic, insistent percussion, eerie vocal chanting, and pipes." He noted that as the record was among the first recordings of this style of music to receive relatively wide exposure in Europe and North America, it "anticipated the wider popularity of trance-like music among both electronic rock and progressive African musicians later in the 20th century." In 1998, The Wire included Presents the Pipes of Pan at Jajouka in their list of "100 Records That Set the World on Fire (While No One Was Listening)". They noted that Jones "deployed the full arsenal of psychedelic signal processing" to enhance the music and his own experience of the musicians, resulting in an LP that "documents a millennia-old music, the sound of panic itself, as well as the fragmented mind of Jones in the months before his death." They added of its prescient musical style:

"Drums throb in the foreground as the pipers are sucked figuratively into the slipstream of a jet engine via extreme phase shifting. A women's chorus, shrieking like seagulls, loops in the distance. Jones's apology for a muffled female solo is sufficient to raise gooseflesh: "It was not for our ears". Well before dub reggae and its spawn – the cult of remixing – Jajouka showcased techno-primitive terror, up where the air was very thin."

According to author Louise Grey, the album was influential enough that other figures besides Jones, such as Ornette Coleman, Bill Laswell and Richard Horowitz, were also drawn into working with the Joujouka musicians. She added: "With supporters like this, Joujouka could hardly fail to generate interest in those interested in psychotropic music – even if there was a series of acrimonious fallings-out between the musicians after the appearance of their famous friends." The Independent writer Phil Sweeney highlighted the album's "ghita flutes and assorted drums" and wrote that parts of the album resemble "nothing so much as a Scottish regimental pipe band running amok on a mixture of amphetamine sulphate, Special Brew and helium." In 1999, Rob Chapman of Mojo wrote that Jones entered the project "with all the anthropological fervour of a Samuel Charters or Alan Lomax", but in his doctoring of the tapes, the resulting album is a "proto-dub masterpiece", as belatedly recognised by the Rolling Stones when they collaborated with the Master Musicians of Joujouka for Steel Wheels.

== Track listing ==
All songs written by Pipes of Pan at Joujouka

1. "55 (Hamsa oua Hamsine)" – 0:58
2. "War Song/Standing" + "One Half (Kaim Oua Nos") – 2:22
3. "Take Me with You Darling, Take Me with You (Dinimaak A Habibi Dinimaak)" – 8:06
4. "Your Eyes Are Like a Cup of Tea (Al Yunic Sharbouni Ate)" – 10:35
5. "I Am Calling Out (L'Afta)" – 5:55
6. "Your Eyes Are Like a Cup of Tea" (reprise with flute) – 18:04

Titles come from Point Music reissue track listings as original vinyl release package had no titles
