= Bachir Attar =

Moroccan musician

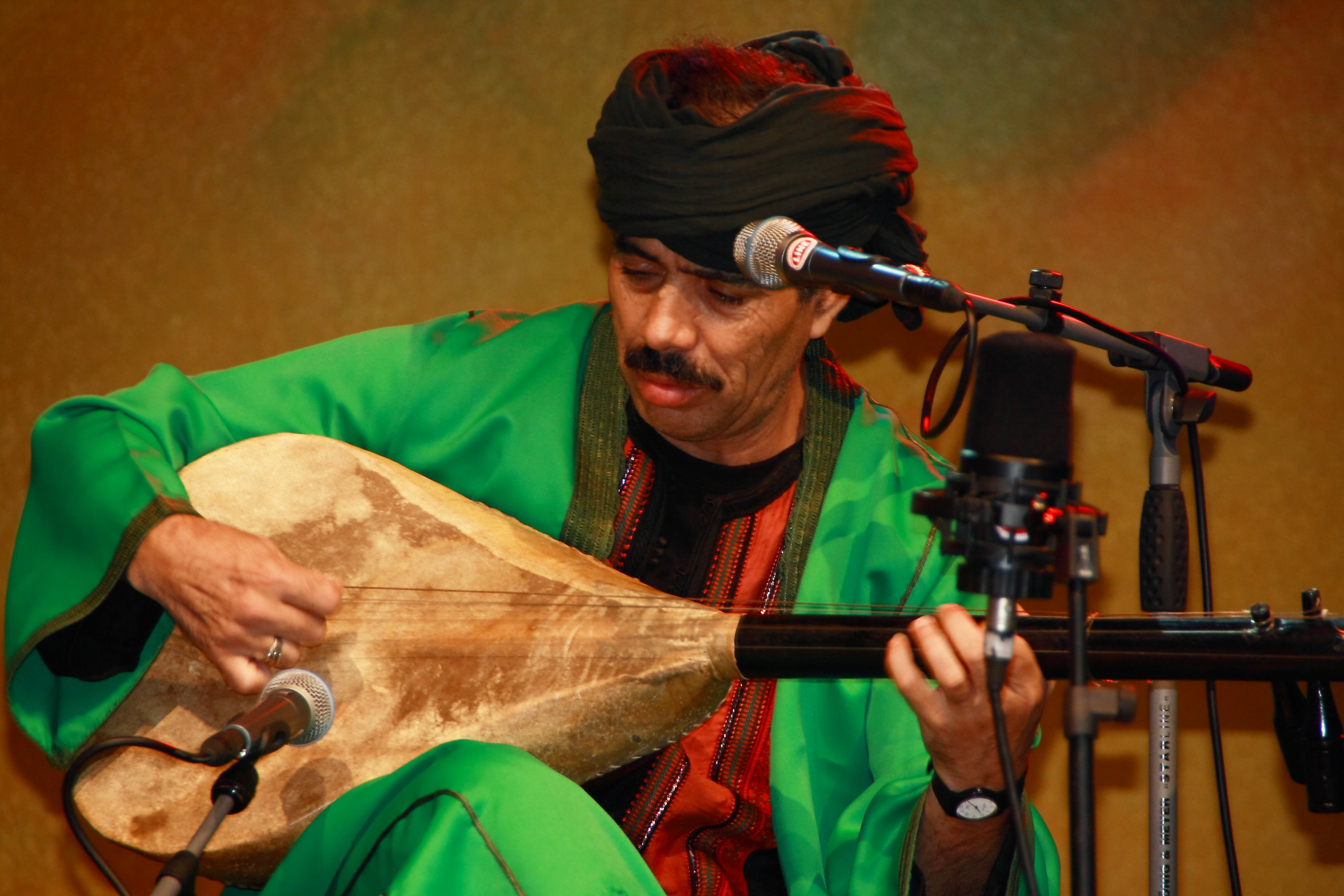
Image of Bachir Attar

Bachir Attar (Arabic: بشير عطار, born 1964) is a Moroccan musician and the leader of The Master Musicians of Jajouka led by Bachir Attar. He is the son of Hadj Abdesalam Attar, who led the group Master Musicians of Jajouka at the time of their album, Brian Jones Presents The Pipes of Pan at Jajouka, produced by Brian Jones in 1968.

== Attar as leader of the Master Musicians of Jajouka ==
Bachir Attar was born in Jajouka, Morocco, and the Master Musicians are descended from members of his father's group. They include his brothers Mostapha Attar, Abdellah Attar, and the son of the famous drum master, Mohammed "Berdous" Attar. Other members include Abderrzak el Attar, Mokhtar Jaghdal, and Mohamed Attar, moqqadem of the shrine of Sidi Ahmed Sheikh, and Abdellah Bokhzar, all who played with Bachir's father. Hamri was released as manager in 1972. Hamri had sold the copyright for the music to Brian Jones, and Bachir Attar had to negotiate with the Estate of Brian Jones and The Rolling Stones for the loan of their ancient music for the 1995 reissue of the first album.

Attar and the group recorded under the shorter and correct pronunciation of the Moghrebi name The Master Musicians of Jajouka on soundtracks for films including The Cell; The Hand of Fatima in 2009 by director Augusta Palmer; William S. Burroughs: A Man Within; directed by Yoni Leyser (2010); and Nicolas Roeg's Bad Timing (1980). Albums with the group and Attar include Apocalypse Across the Sky (Axiom, 1992), Jajouka Between the Mountains (WOMAD, 1996), appearances with the Rolling Stones on "Continental Drift" from the album Steel Wheels in 1989, the second album of the group from 1974, produced by Joel Rubiner, entitled The Master Musicians of Jajouka, and the 1995 reissue of Brian Jones Presents The Pipes of Pan at Jajouka on Point (Polygram) records. The spelling of "Jajouka" in the 1995 reissue title was corrected from "Joujouka" in the initial release's title for consistency with the band name spelling on the second album from 1974.

== Solo and group performances and recordings ==
In addition to his work with Master Musicians of Jajouka, Bachir Attar was granted a Music Composition Fellowship by "The New York Foundation for the Arts" in 1990 for his compositions "Memories of My Father" and "Sounds of New York". Attar has also recorded a solo album entitled The Next Dream, which was produced in New York City by Bill Laswell in connection with Apocalypse Across The Sky, the album Laswell recorded of the traditional music for his Axiom label. Attar was a guest performer on Nicky Skopelitis's 1993 album, Ekstasis. He recorded "In New York" with Elliott Sharp in 1990 and toured with Sharp's band Carbon. He also recorded with Debby Harry and Chris Stein on the Cash Cow: The Best of Giorno Poetry Systems 1965-1993. Talvin Singh and Attar also made a CD in London 2000. With Attar, the group has toured extensively in Canada, Europe, Hong Kong and USA since the 1990s. Attar's manager and official photographer during his group's 1990s recording career was his wife, Cherie Nutting, whom he had married in 1989. The two parted amicably in 1996, but she was managing him and his band again by the mid-2000s.

The Master Musicians of Jajouka led by Bachir Attar released a live album on newly founded Jajouka Records in January 2009. Bachir Attar and The Master Musicians of Jajouka toured the US in winter 2009 playing at UCLA Live, Arabesque: Arts of the Arab World festival at The Kennedy Center in Washington D.C. among other concerts around the US. In August 2009 Bachir and the Jajouka Masters played at Festival des Plages in Al Hoceima, Morocco, and during la Fête du Trône in honor of the coronation of His Majesty King Mohammed VI. In June 2009 Bachir Attar and The Master Musicians of Jajouka performed with Ornette Coleman, Patti Smith and Flea from the Red Hot Chili Peppers at The Southbank Meltdown Festival in London. In July 2010 Bachir and his master musicians group performed again with Ornette Coleman at The North Sea Jazz Festival in Rotterdam, Holland. A new CD and vinyl album, The Source, was released in July 2010 by Son du Maquis in Paris. On May 12, 2013, Attar's performance with the Master Musicians of Jajouka on CNN's Anthony Bourdain: Parts Unknown, was aired in the first season's episode 5 segment, which focused on Tangier.

=== Discography ===
(Solo)

- In New York, with Elliott Sharp (1990)
- The Next Dream, with Maceo Parker (1992)
