= Abdellah Hammoudi =

Moroccan anthropologist

- عبد الله حمودي
- Born: 1945 (age 80–81); El Kelaa des Sraghna, Morocco

Academic background
- Education: University of Mohammed V Pantheon-Sorbonne University

Academic work
- Discipline: Anthropology

Abdellah Hammoudi (Arabic: عبد الله حمودي; born in 1945) is a Moroccan anthropologist, ethnographer, and emeritus professor of anthropology at Princeton University.

== Biography ==
Abdellah Hammoudi was born in the douar Oulad Amer near the vicinity of Kalaat Sraghna in 1945. He received a bachelor's degree in philosophy from the Faculty of Letters at University of Mohammed V, and, at the same time, a degree in sociology from the Institute of Sociology. He obtained his doctorate from the Pantheon-Sorbonne University in 1977. From 1972 to 1989, he worked as a Professor at the Agronomic Institute of the Mohammed V University in Rabat. Before moving to the United States of America as a Faisal Visiting Professor for Anthropology at Princeton University in 1989, and he joined permanently faculty in 1991, a post which he held until his retirement on 1 July 2016 when he was given the title emeritus professor. He was the Founding Director and served for over ten years as Director of the University's Institute for the Transregional Study of the Contemporary Middle East, North Africa, and Central Asia.

== Works ==
=== Books ===
- La victime et ses masques: essai sur le sacrifice et la mascarade au Mahgreb. Paris: Editions du Seuil. 1988.; This book is about the practice of bujlood.
  - The Victim and Its Masks: An Essay on Sacrifice and Masquerade in the Maghreb. Translated by Wissing, Paula. Chicago: University of Chicago Press. 1993.
- Master and Disciple: The Cultural Foundations of Moroccan Authoritarianism. Chicago: University of Chicago Press. 1997. ISBN 9780226315270.
- Une saison à la Mecque: récit de pélerinage. Paris: Editions du Seuil. 2005.
  - A Season in Mecca: Narrative of a Pilgrimage. Translated by Ghazaleh, Pascale. New York: Hill & Wang. 2006. ISBN 9780809076093.
- Al-Ḥadāthah wa al-Huwiyyah: Siyāsat al-Khiṭāb wa al-Ḥukm al-Maʿrifī Ḥawla al-Dīn wa al-Lughah [Modernity and Identity: The Politics of Discourse and Epistemic Judgment on Religion and Language]. Casablanca: Al-markaz Al-thaqāfī Al-ʻarabī. 2015.
- Al-Masāfah wa al-Taḥlīl: Fī Ṣiyāghat Anṯrūbūlūjiyā [Distance and Analysis: On the Formulation of an Arab Anthropology]. Casablanca: Dar Toubkal. 2019.
- Mā Qabl al-Ḥadāthah: Ijtihādāt fī Taṣawwur ʿUlūm Ijtimāʿiyyah ʿArabiyyah [Before Modernity: Directions in the Representation of Arabic Social Sciences]. Casablanca: Dar Toubkal. 2022.

=== Edited books ===
- Hammoudi, Abdellah; Schaar, Stuart, eds. (1995). Algeria's Impasse. Princeton, NJ: Center of International Studies, Princeton University.
- Hammoudi, Abdellah; Leveau, Rémy, eds. (2002). Monarchies arabes: transitions et derives dynastiques. Paris: La Documentation Française.
- Borneman, John; Hammoudi, Abdellah, eds. (2009). Being there: the fieldwork encounter and the making of truth. Berkeley: University of California Press.

== Awards ==
In 1998, he was awarded a Guggenheim Fellowship from the John Simon Guggenheim Memorial Foundation.

In 2005, he won the second Prize Lettre Ulysses Award for the "Art of Reportage", for his non-fiction work entitled Une saison à la Mecque: récit de pélerinage.

== Sources ==
- Al-Ajarma, Kholoud (2024-11-04). "Abdellah Hammoudi: For an Arab Anthropology". In Hashas, Mohammed (ed.). Contemporary Moroccan Thought: On Philosophy, Theology, Society, and Culture. Brill. pp. 587–608. ISBN 978-90-04-51953-4.
