= Jajouka, Something Good Comes to You =

- Directed by: Marc and Éric Hurtado
- Release date: 2012
- Running time: 62 minutes
- Country: France

Jajouka, Something Good Comes to You is a 2012 mockumentary film directed by Marc Hurtado and Éric Hurtado.

== Synopsis ==
In the form of a folk tale, the film examines ancient musical legends in Jajouka, a village nestled high in the Rif Mountains.
