= Cotchford Farm =

Farmhouse in East Sussex, England

Coordinates: 51°05′25″N 0°06′25″E

Cotchford Farm is a farmhouse building to the southwest of the village of Hartfield, East Sussex, in the High Weald Area of Outstanding Natural Beauty, in southern England. Its owners have included author A. A. Milne, who wrote all of his Winnie-the-Pooh books at the house, often inspired by the local landscape, and musician Brian Jones, who drowned in the swimming pool at the house on 3 July 1969. It is listed Grade II on the National Heritage List for England.

The building stands on Cotchford Lane, a private lane off the B2026 between Hartfield and Duddleswell, postcode TN7 4DN. It is located close to the Ashdown Forest, and roughly equidistant from East Grinstead about 10 miles (16 km) to the west on the A22, Royal Tunbridge Wells to the east on the A26, and Uckfield to the south.

The building is a timber-framed farmhouse, with "L" plan, possibly dating to the 17th century or perhaps the mid-16th century. It was probably originally built with wattle and daub infilled walls and a thatched roof, but was later refaced with red brick on the ground floor, and the roof rehung with tiles. The main block has three storeys oriented approximately north–south, with a two-storey wing to the south, and the kitchen in a single storey addition off the north end of the main block. Inside, the house has a split-level drawing room with inglenook fireplace, and views in four directions but mainly over the garden to the east and south, and also an oak-panelled dining room. Upstairs are six bedrooms, four on the first floor and two on the second floor.

The building was bought as a country home by the author A. A. Milne in 1925. Milne died at Cotchford Farm in 1956. There are statues of Milne's son, Christopher Robin, and his character Owl in the garden, and also a sundial with a gnomon in the shape of a quill and a base carved with images of Pooh characters, including Piglet, Tigger and Roo, the initials "AAM", the words "This warm and sunny spot belongs to Pooh, And here he wonders what it's time to do". A stream runs through trees along the southern boundary of the garden, with Poohsticks Bridge approximately 0.5 miles (0.80 km) upstream to the west.

After being owned by an American couple, the Taylors, who installed an outdoor swimming pool, the house was bought by Rolling Stones band member Brian Jones. He drowned in the swimming pool in July 1969, aged 27. The house retains some of the fittings he installed, including coloured lighting and glazing. It was bought by Alistair Johns in 1970 and became a Grade II listed building in 1982.

The house was put on sale by Johns's wife, Harriet Johns, for £2m in April 2012, including its 9.5 acres (3.8 ha) plot with the heated outdoor swimming pool and fishpond. It failed to sell, and was put up for sale again in 2016, and was sold for £1.8m in June 2017.

== Sources ==
- 6 bedroom detached house for sale, Rightmove, 5 October 2012
- Cotchford Lane, Hartfield, East Sussex, TN7 4DN, Savills,
- No interest in Rolling Stones pool tragedy house, The Argus, 3 February 2013
- You can buy the house where Winnie the Pooh was born (if you’ve got a spare £1.9m), Metro, 14 March 2016
