= Salmonblaster =

- Origin: London, Ontario, Canada
- Genres: Alternative rock
- Years active: 1994–1998
- Label: Liquid Records
- Past members: Matt Werm; Brady Parr; Mat Davis; Dave Hall; Eric Howden; Jesse Buchanan

Salmonblaster was a Canadian alternative rock band from London. The band's lineup consisted of guitarist and singer Matt Werm, drummer Brady Parr and bassist Mat Davis. They were best known for their 1996 song "Freeway" from their Salmonblaster self-titled album, which received regular play on Canadian music station Much Music. Their 1996 self-titled album was a top 10 hit on Canada's college music chart in 1996 peaking at number 5 in July of that year. By November 1996, they were Toronto's top selling indie band.

== Early years (1994–1996) ==
Salmonblaster's members came together from various London bands in July 1994. Werm (originally known as Matt Wormsbecher) played guitar for Boris is Back, Parr played in Petch, and Mat Davis was the guitarist for M.A.D. Davis was the second bassist for Salmonblaster. Originally Dave Hall, who was also in Petch, played bass but left the band when he moved to Ottawa.

In 1994, they released a 3-song cassette that received heavy local airplay on CHRW-FM, the University of Western Ontario's radio station. The song "Chomalungma" made it onto the London Underground III compilation. In 1995, they released a second 3-song cassette that contained two songs that would later appear on their self-titled album: "Sugar Rush" and "Brian Jones".

== Self titled album and early success (1996–1998) ==
On July 16, 1996, Salmonblaster released their debut (and only) album. The self-titled album was a college chart hit, debuting at No. 5. The band toured behind the album throughout 1997 opening shows for I Mother Earth, Stabbing Westward, Econoline Crush, Glueleg, and The Gandharvas, along with a long list of Canadian independent bands. During this time Davis left and The Gandharvas bassist Eric Howden (now the solo artist Raised by Swans) filled in.

On March 20, 1998, the band appeared on the Tom Green Show. They played a new song called "Secret Agent" with a new bassist who was not introduced and was replaced by Jesse Buchanan who remained with the band until their dissolution. "Secret Agent" was to be the first single off their forthcoming second album which had the working title of Headfuls of Chills, however shortly after appearing on the Tom Green Show the band broke up citing creative differences, though Werm and Parr would form two subsequent bands (Panic Coast and Tournament!). Werm would later tell the UWO Gazette that Salmonblaster succumbed to pressure. The appearance on the Tom Green Show was released as part of the DVD set The Tom Green Show: The Complete Series - Inside and Outside the Box in 2005.

== Post break up ==
After Salmonblaster broke up, Werm and Parr went on to form Panic Coast, who released Future Projected in 2000. The band later changed their name to The Black Saturdays and released a self-titled album. Werm was also in Viperscheme who released one EP called Sell the Sky in 2001. Parr and Howden currently play in critically acclaimed indie band Raised by Swans, while both Parr and Werm are in a band called Tournament!.

In 2024, Yeah Right! Records released a double vinyl reissue of Salmonblaster's self-titled record that included songs from the band's unreleased second album.
