= The Master Musicians of Jajouka led by Bachir Attar =

Moroccan Jbala Sufi music collective

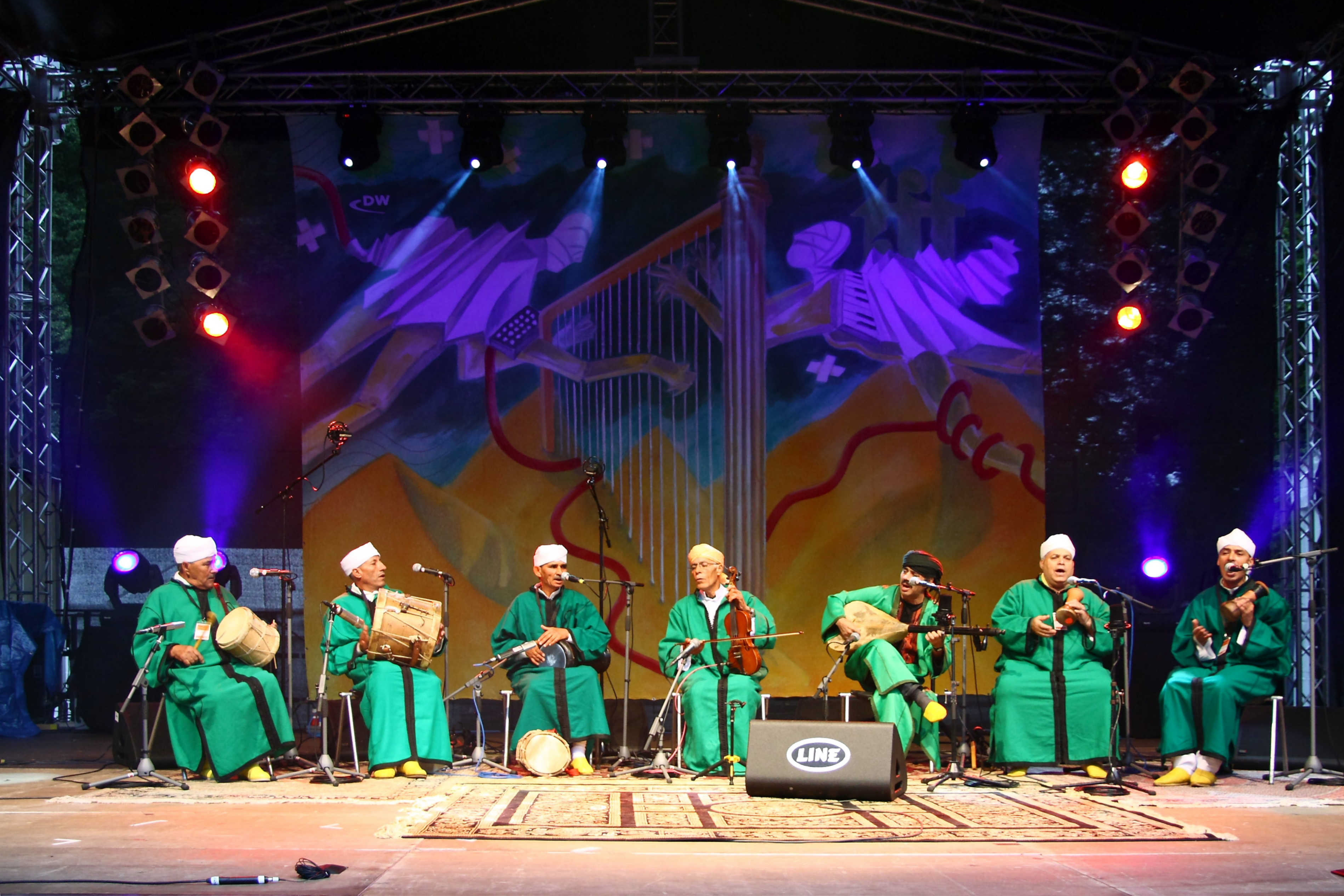
- Master Musicians of Jajouka led by Bachir Attar 2011

Background information
- Origin: Jajouka, Morocco
- Genres: World, Sufi music of Morocco
- Years active: 1980s–present
- Labels: Rolling Stones Records, Adelphi, Axiom, Womad, PolyGram, Jajouka Records Inc.
- Members: See: Members
- Website: Jajouka.com

The Master Musicians of Jajouka led by Bachir Attar (sometimes written as ...featuring Bachir Attar) are a collective of Jbala Sufi musicians, serving as a modern representation of a centuries-old music tradition. The collective includes musicians from the village of Jajouka (sometimes spelled as Joujouka or Zahjouka), in the Rif Mountains of northern Morocco. Most members are the sons of previous members, and adopt the surname Attar ("perfume maker").

== History ==
The original Master Musicians of Joujouka were first documented by Western journalists in the early 1950s. In the early 1990s, the collective split into two factions, as first reported by visiting musician Lee Ranaldo. One collective retained the name "The Master Musicians of Joujouka". Meanwhile, the faction led by Bachir Attar, whose father had led the group in the late 1960s, took on the name "The Master Musicians of Jajouka led by Bachir Attar". Bachir Attar's group attracted protests at concerts in the United Kingdom, and international journalists noted that the schism created discord in the collective's home village. Other journalists and fans conceded that both groups were working to preserve their ancient musical heritage.

Bachir Attar's group released the album Apocalypse Across the Sky in 1992, produced by Bill Laswell. Jajouka Between the Mountains followed in 1996, produced by Tchad Blake; and Master Musicians of Jajouka Featuring Bachir Attar, produced by Talvin Singh, was released in 2000. The album, The Road to Jajouka, was released in 2014 and featured guest appearances by Ornette Coleman, John Medeski, Flea, DJ Logic, Lee Ranaldo, Bill Laswell, and many others.

== Members ==
Current

- Bachir Attar
- Mustapha Attar
- Mohamed "Hadj" Attar
- Amin Attar
- Mohamed Attar The Mohkadem
- Mohamed Attar Berdouz Jr.
- Hamido Attar
- Abdellah Bohkzar
- Mokhtar Jaghdal
- Abdelzarak "Hadj" Attar
- Bouker Talha
- Ahmed el Ballouti
- Ahmed Bahkat

Former

- Larbi Hlalli Attar
- Abdellah Bokzar
- Tahir Bokzar
- Abdeslam Bokzar
- Mohamed El Hatmi (currently with Master Musicians of Joujouka)
- Ali Maidoubi
- Ali Nachat

== Discography ==
- Apocalypse Across the Sky (1992)
- Jajouka Between the Mountains (1996)
- Master Musicians of Jajouka Featuring Bachir Attar (2000)
- Jajouka Live Vol. 1 (2009)
- The Road to Jajouka (2014)
- Dancing Under the Moon (2022)

=== Film soundtracks and compilation albums ===
- Ornette: Made in America (1985, film sound track appearance)
- The Sheltering Sky (1990, film soundtrack and film appearance)
- Naked Lunch (1991, film soundtrack appearance)
- Lost in the Translation: Axiom Ambient (1994)
- The Cell (2000, film soundtrack appearance with The London Philharmonic Orchestra)
- Time's Up Live (2001)
- Along Came Polly (2004, film soundtrack appearance)
- Jajouka Something Good Comes To You - Master Musicians Of Jajouka Led By Bachir Attar (2021, La Huit)
