= Brian Jones =

English musician (1942–1969)

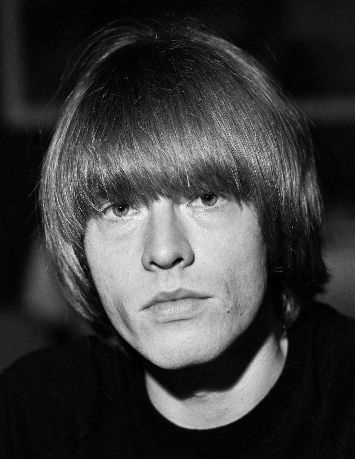
- Jones in 1965
- Born: Lewis Brian Hopkin Jones; 28 February 1942; Cheltenham, Gloucestershire, England
- Died: 3 July 1969 (aged 27); Hartfield, East Sussex, England
- Cause of death: Drowning
- Other name: Elmo Lewis
- Children: ~8
- Musical career
- Genres: Rock; blues; psychedelia; world
- Occupations: Musician; songwriter; record producer
- Instruments: Guitar; harmonica; vocals; keyboards; marimba; recorder; dulcimer; sitar; saxophone
- Years active: 1957–1969
- Formerly of: The Rolling Stones; Master Musicians of Joujouka

Lewis Brian Hopkin Jones (28 February 1942 – 3 July 1969) was an English musician and one of the founders of the Rolling Stones. Initially a slide guitarist, he went on to play electric guitar, sing backing vocals and play a wide variety of instruments on Rolling Stones recordings and in concerts.

After he founded the Rolling Stones as a British blues outfit in 1962 and gave the band its name, Jones's fellow band members Keith Richards and Mick Jagger began to take over the band's musical direction, especially after they became a successful songwriting team.

When Jones developed alcohol and drug problems, his performance in the studio became increasingly unreliable, leading to a diminished role within the band. In June 1969, the Rolling Stones dismissed Jones; guitarist Mick Taylor took his place in the group. Less than a month later, Jones died by drowning at the age of 27 in the swimming pool at his home at Cotchford Farm, East Sussex. His death was referenced in songs by many other pop bands, and Pete Townshend and Jim Morrison wrote poems about it. In 1989, he was inducted into the Rock and Roll Hall of Fame as a member of the Rolling Stones.

== Biography ==
=== Early life ===
Lewis Brian Hopkin Jones was born in the Park Nursing Home in Cheltenham, Gloucestershire, on Saturday, 28 February 1942. An attack of croup at the age of four left Jones with asthma that lasted for the rest of his life. His middle-class parents, Lewis Blount Jones and Louisa Beatrice Jones (née Simmonds), were of Welsh descent. Brian had two sisters: Pamela, who was born on 3 October 1943 and died on 14 October 1945 of leukaemia; and Barbara, who was born on 22 August 1946.

Jones attended local schools, including Dean Close School from September 1949 to July 1953; and Cheltenham Grammar School for Boys (now Pate's Grammar School), which he entered in September 1953 after passing the eleven-plus exam. He enjoyed badminton and diving at school and became first clarinet in the school orchestra. Jones reportedly obtained seven O-level passes in 1957, thence continuing into the sixth form and obtaining a further two O-levels. He passed A-levels in physics and chemistry, but he failed in biology.

Jones was able to perform well in exams despite a lack of academic effort. However, he found school regimented and disliked school uniforms and conformism in general; Jones himself said: "When I made the sixth form, I found myself accepted by the older boys; suddenly I was in." His hostility to authority figures resulted in his suspension from school on two occasions. According to Dick Hattrell, a childhood friend, "He was a rebel without a cause, but when examinations came he was brilliant."

Both Jones's parents were interested in music; his father was a piano teacher in addition to his job as an aeronautical engineer, and his mother played the piano and organ and led the choir at the local church. Jones listened to classical music as a child but preferred blues, particularly Elmore James and Robert Johnson. In 1957, he first heard Cannonball Adderley's music and took an interest in jazz. Jones persuaded his parents to buy him a saxophone, and two years later, his parents gave him his first acoustic guitar as a 17th birthday present. Jones began performing at local blues and jazz clubs while busking and working odd jobs. He reportedly stole small amounts of money from work to pay for cigarettes, for which he was sacked. At the start of the 1960s, Jones lived a bohemian lifestyle abroad, busking with his guitar on the streets for money and living off the charity of others. Eventually, he ran short of money and returned to England. In 1961, Jones applied for a scholarship to Cheltenham Art College. He was initially accepted, but the offer was withdrawn two days later after an unidentified acquaintance wrote to the college, calling Jones "an irresponsible drifter".

=== Forming the Rolling Stones ===
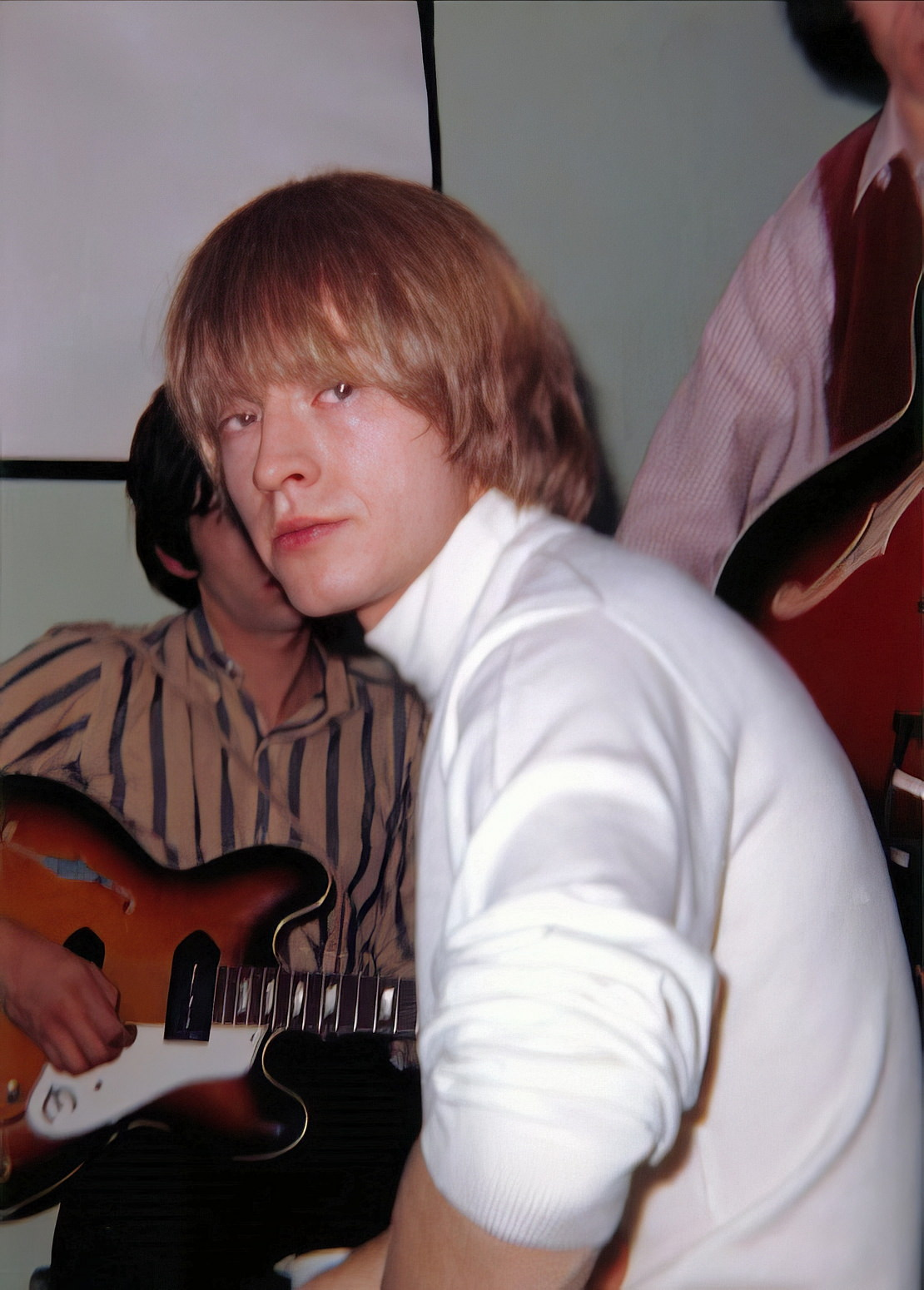
Jones backstage in May 1965

Jones left Cheltenham and moved to London, where he became friends with fellow musicians Alexis Korner, future Manfred Mann singer Paul Jones, future Cream bassist Jack Bruce, and others who made up the small London rhythm and blues and jazz scene. He became a blues musician, for a brief time calling himself "Elmo Lewis" and playing slide guitar. He also started a group with Paul Jones called the Roosters. In January 1963, after both Joneses left the group, Eric Clapton took over Brian's position as guitarist.

Jones placed an advertisement in the 2 May 1962 edition of Jazz News, a Soho club information sheet, inviting musicians to audition for a new R&B group at the Bricklayer's Arms pub; pianist Ian Stewart was the first to respond. Later, singer Mick Jagger also joined this band; Jagger and his childhood friend Keith Richards had met Jones when he and Paul were playing Robert Johnson's "Dust My Broom" with Korner's band at the Ealing Jazz Club. Jagger brought guitarist Richards to rehearsals; Richards then joined the band. Jones's and Stewart's acceptance of Richards and the Chuck Berry songs he wanted to play coincided with the departure of blues purists guitarist Geoff Bradford and singer Brian Knight, who had no tolerance for Chuck Berry.

As Richards tells it, Jones came up with the name the "Rollin' Stones" (later with the 'g') while on the phone with a venue owner. "The voice on the other end of the line obviously said, 'What are you called?' Panic! The Best of Muddy Waters album was lying on the floor—and track five, side one was 'Rollin' Stone Blues'". The Rollin' Stones played their first gig on 12 July 1962 at the Marquee Club in London, with a line-up of Jagger, Richards, Jones, Stewart, bass player Dick Taylor (later of the Pretty Things) and drummer Tony Chapman.

From September 1962 to September 1963, Jones, Jagger and Richards shared a flat (referred to by Richards as "a beautiful dump") at 102 Edith Grove, Chelsea, with James Phelge, a future photographer whose name was used in some of the group's early "Nanker/Phelge" writing credits. Jones and Richards spent day after day playing guitar while listening to blues records (notably Jimmy Reed, Muddy Waters, Willie Dixon and Howlin' Wolf). During this time, Jones also taught Jagger how to play harmonica.

The four Stones went searching for a bassist and drummer, finally settling on Bill Wyman on bass because he had a spare VOX AC30 guitar amplifier and always had cigarettes, as well as a bass guitar that he had built himself. After playing with Mick Avory, Tony Chapman and Carlo Little, in January 1963 they finally persuaded jazz-influenced Charlie Watts to join them. At the time, Watts was considered by fellow musicians to be one of the better drummers in London; he had played with (among others) Alexis Korner's group Blues Incorporated.

Watts described Jones's role in these early days: "Brian was very instrumental in pushing the band at the beginning. Keith and I would look at him and say he was barmy. It was a crusade to him to get us on the stage in a club and be paid half-a-crown and to be billed as an R&B band."

While acting as the band's business manager, Jones received £5 a week more than the other members (equivalent to £91 in 2025), which did not sit well with the rest of the band and created resentment. Richards has said that both he and Jagger were surprised to learn that Jones considered himself the leader and was receiving the extra £5, especially as other people, like Giorgio Gomelsky, appeared to be doing the booking.

=== Musical contributions ===
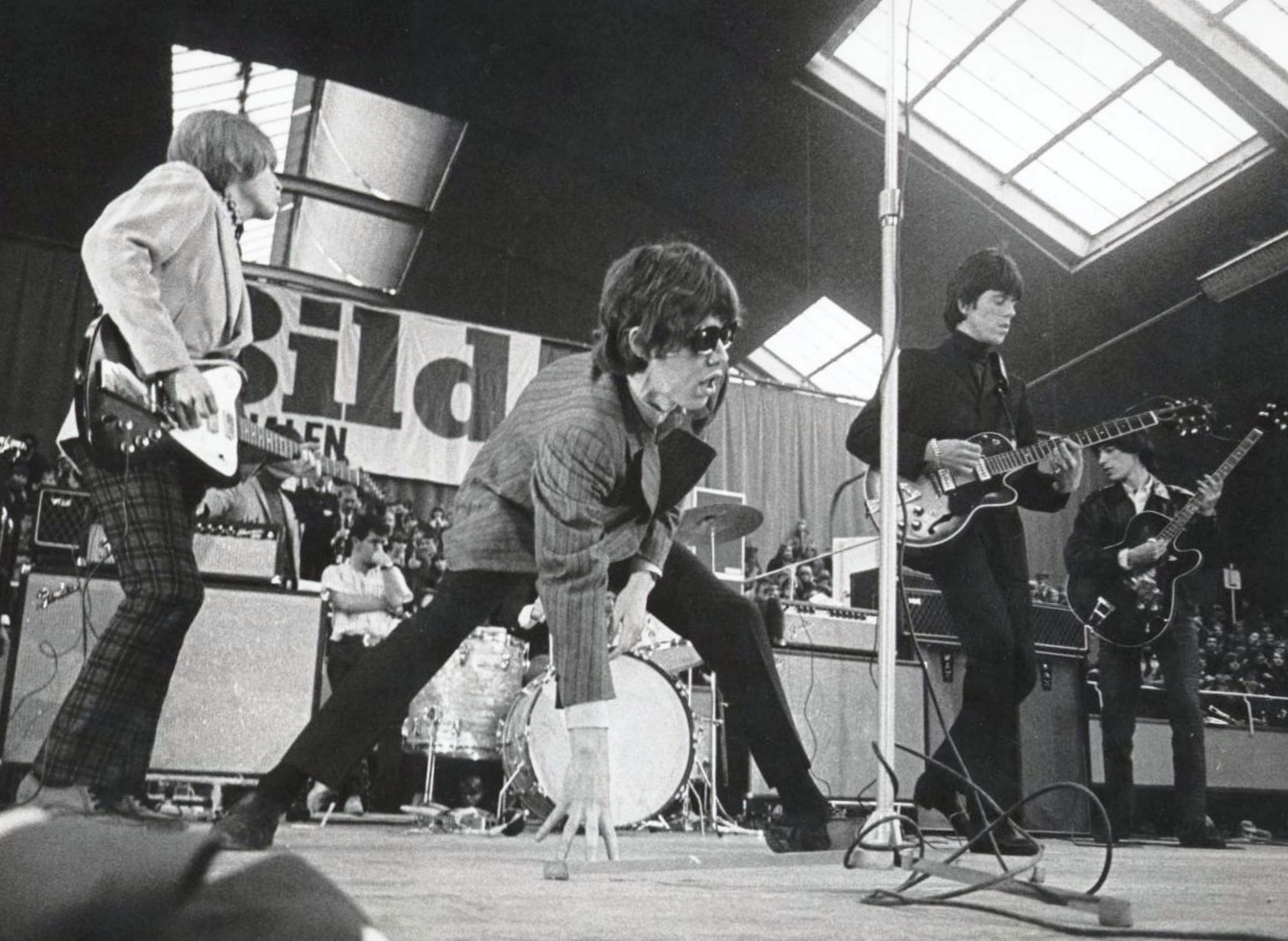
Jones (left) with the Rolling Stones in Stockholm, April 1966

Jones was a gifted multi-instrumentalist, proficient on a wide variety of musical instruments. His ability to play a wide variety of instruments is most evident on the albums Aftermath (1966), Between the Buttons (1967) and Their Satanic Majesties Request (1967). As a guitarist, in the early days, he favoured a white teardrop-shaped electric guitar produced by the Vox company, especially in live performances; he also played a wide variety of electric and acoustic guitars from companies such as Rickenbacker, Gibson, and Fender. As a slide guitarist, he favoured the open E and open G tunings.

Richards maintains that what he calls "guitar weaving" emerged from this period, from listening to Jimmy Reed albums: "We listened to the teamwork, trying to work out what was going on in those records; how you could play together with two guitars and make it sound like four or five."

=== Changes in band dynamics and estrangement from bandmates ===
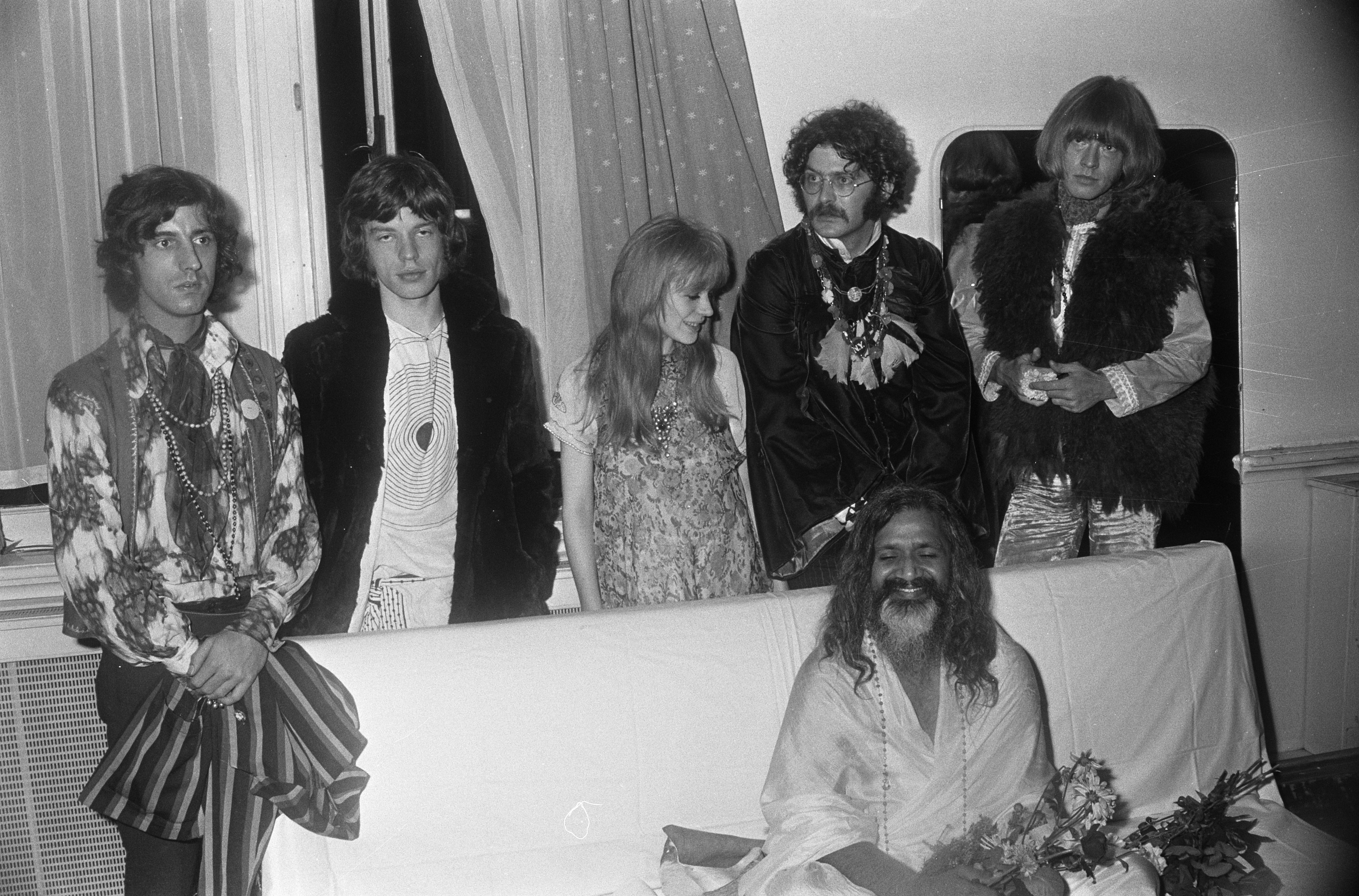
Jones (far right) with Michael Cooper, Mick Jagger, Marianne Faithfull, Shepard Sherbell, and Maharishi Mahesh Yogi (at the front) in Amsterdam, September 1967

Oldham recognised the financial advantages of band members writing their own songs, as exemplified by Lennon–McCartney, and that playing covers would not sustain a band in the limelight for long. Further, he wanted to make Jagger's flamboyant charisma a focus of live performances. Jones saw his influence over the Stones' direction wane as their repertoire comprised fewer blues covers than he preferred; more Jagger/Richards originals developed (although many still had a bluesy sound), and Oldham increased his own managerial control, displacing Jones from yet another role.

In March 1967, Anita Pallenberg, Jones's girlfriend of two years, left him for Richards when Jones became violent towards her while the three were on a trip to Morocco, further damaging the already strained relations between Jones and Richards. Jones was later hospitalised in Morocco. As tensions and Jones' substance abuse increased, his musical contributions became sporadic. He grew bored with the guitar, sought out exotic instruments to play, and became increasingly absent from recording sessions. In Peter Whitehead's promotional film for We Love You, made in July 1967, he appears extremely groggy and disoriented.

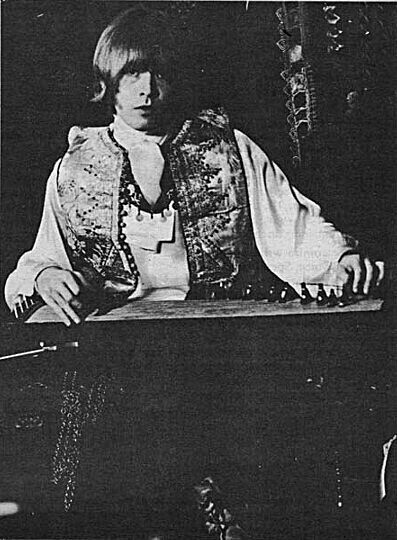
Jones in mid-1967

Jones was arrested for drug possession on 10 May 1967, shortly after the Redlands bust at Richards's Sussex home. Authorities found marijuana, cocaine, and methamphetamine in his flat. He confessed to marijuana use but said he did not use hard drugs.

On June 16–18, 1967, Jones attended the Monterey International Pop Festival and introduced the Jimi Hendrix Experience.

Hostility grew among Jones, Jagger, and Richards, further alienating Jones from the group. Although many noted that Jones could be friendly and outgoing, Wyman, Richards, and Watts have commented that he could also be cruel and difficult. By most accounts, Jones' attitude changed frequently; he was one minute caring and generous, the next making an effort to anger everyone. As Wyman observed in Stone Alone: "There were at least two sides to Brian's personality. One Brian was introverted, shy, sensitive, [and] deep-thinking. The other was a preening peacock, gregarious, artistic, desperately needing assurance from his peers." Wyman added: "He pushed every friendship to the limit and way beyond."

Charlie Watts recalled that Jones indulged in drinking and drug taking, "but they weren't very good for him...he wasn't strong enough mentally or physically to take any of it. Brian was one of those people who did everything to excess." Watts also remarked that Jones was sometimes not very pleasant and that he upset other people very easily.

During the 1968 sessions for Beggars Banquet, producer Jimmy Miller later described Jones as "sort of in and out" and said that he could not be relied upon consistently in the studio. Miller nevertheless credited Jones with the slide guitar part on "No Expectations"; Mick Jagger later recalled the song as "the last time I remember Brian really being totally involved in something that was really worth doing". Jean-Luc Godard's film One Plus One, later released in another version as Sympathy for the Devil, documented the development of "Sympathy for the Devil" and shows Jones at the sessions, although later commentary has described him as increasingly marginal to the band's work at the time.

Where once Jones played multiple instruments on many tracks, he played only minor roles on a few pieces during the latter stage of his time with the band. Jones's last formal appearance was in the December 1968 The Rolling Stones Rock and Roll Circus, a part-concert, part circus-act film organised by the band. It went unreleased for more than 25 years because Jagger was unhappy with the band's performance compared with others in the film, such as Jethro Tull, John Lennon, the Who, and Taj Mahal. Commentary included as bonus material indicated that almost everyone at the concert sensed that Jones's time with the Rolling Stones was nearing an end, and Roger Daltrey and Pete Townshend of the Who thought it would be his last live musical performance.

=== Legal issues and departure from the Rolling Stones ===
Jones was arrested a second time on 21 May 1968 for possession of cannabis, which he said had been left by previous tenants of the flat. Because he was on probation at the time, he faced a long jail sentence if found guilty. The jury found him guilty, but the judge had sympathy for Jones; instead of jailing him, he fined him £50 (equivalent to £765 in 2025) plus £105 in costs (equivalent to £1,606 in 2025) and told him: "For goodness' sake, don't get into trouble again or it really will be serious."

Jones's legal troubles, estrangement from his bandmates, substance abuse, and mood swings became too much of an obstacle to his active participation in the band. The Rolling Stones wanted to tour the United States in 1969 for the first time in three years, but Jones was not in a fit condition to tour, and his second arrest exacerbated problems with acquiring a US work visa. In addition, Jones's attendance at rehearsals and recording sessions had become erratic. When he did appear he either rarely contributed anything musically or, when he did, his bandmates would switch off his amplifier, leaving Richards to play nearly all the guitars. According to author Gary Herman, Jones was "literally incapable of making music; when he tried to play harmonica, his mouth started bleeding".

This behaviour was problematic during the Their Satanic Majesties Request and Beggar's Banquet sessions and had worsened by the time the band began recording Let It Bleed. In March 1969, Jones borrowed the group's Jaguar and went shopping in Pimlico Road. After the parked car was towed away by police, Jones hired a chauffeur-driven car to get home. In May 1969, Jones crashed his motorcycle into a shop window and was secretly taken to hospital under an assumed name. From this point, he was still attending recording sessions but was no longer a major contributor to the band's music. By May, he had made two contributions to the work in progress: autoharp on "You Got the Silver" and percussion on "Midnight Rambler". Jagger informed Jones that he would be fired from the band if he did not turn up to a photo session. Looking frail, he nonetheless showed up, and his last photo session as a Rolling Stone took place on 21 May 1969, first at St. Katherine Docks, Tower Bridge, London, and then at Ethan Russell's photographic studio in South Kensington. The photos would appear on the album Through the Past, Darkly (Big Hits Vol. 2) in September 1969.

The Stones decided that following the release of the Let it Bleed album (scheduled for July 1969 in the US), they would start a tour of North America in November 1969. However, the Stones' management was informed that Jones would not receive a work permit owing to his drug convictions. At the suggestion of Stewart, the Stones decided to add a new guitarist. On 8 June 1969, Jones was visited by Jagger, Richards and Watts and was told that the group he had formed would continue without him.

To the public it appeared as if Jones had left voluntarily; the other band members told him that although he was being dismissed, it was his choice how to break it to the public. Jones released a statement on 9 June 1969, announcing his departure. In this statement, he said, among other things, that "I no longer see eye-to-eye with the others over the discs we are cutting." He was replaced by the 20-year-old guitarist Mick Taylor, formerly of John Mayall's Bluesbreakers.

During the period of his decreasing involvement in the band, Jones was living at Cotchford Farm in East Sussex, the residence formerly owned by Winnie-the-Pooh author A. A. Milne, which Jones had purchased in November 1968. Alexis Korner, who visited in late June, noted that Jones seemed "happier than he had ever been". Jones is known to have contacted Korner, Stewart, John Lennon, Ringo Starr, Mitch Mitchell, Alan Price, and Jimmy Miller about intentions to put together another band. Jones had apparently demoed a few of his own songs in the weeks before his death, including "Has Anybody Seen My Baby?" and "Chow Time".

=== Death ===
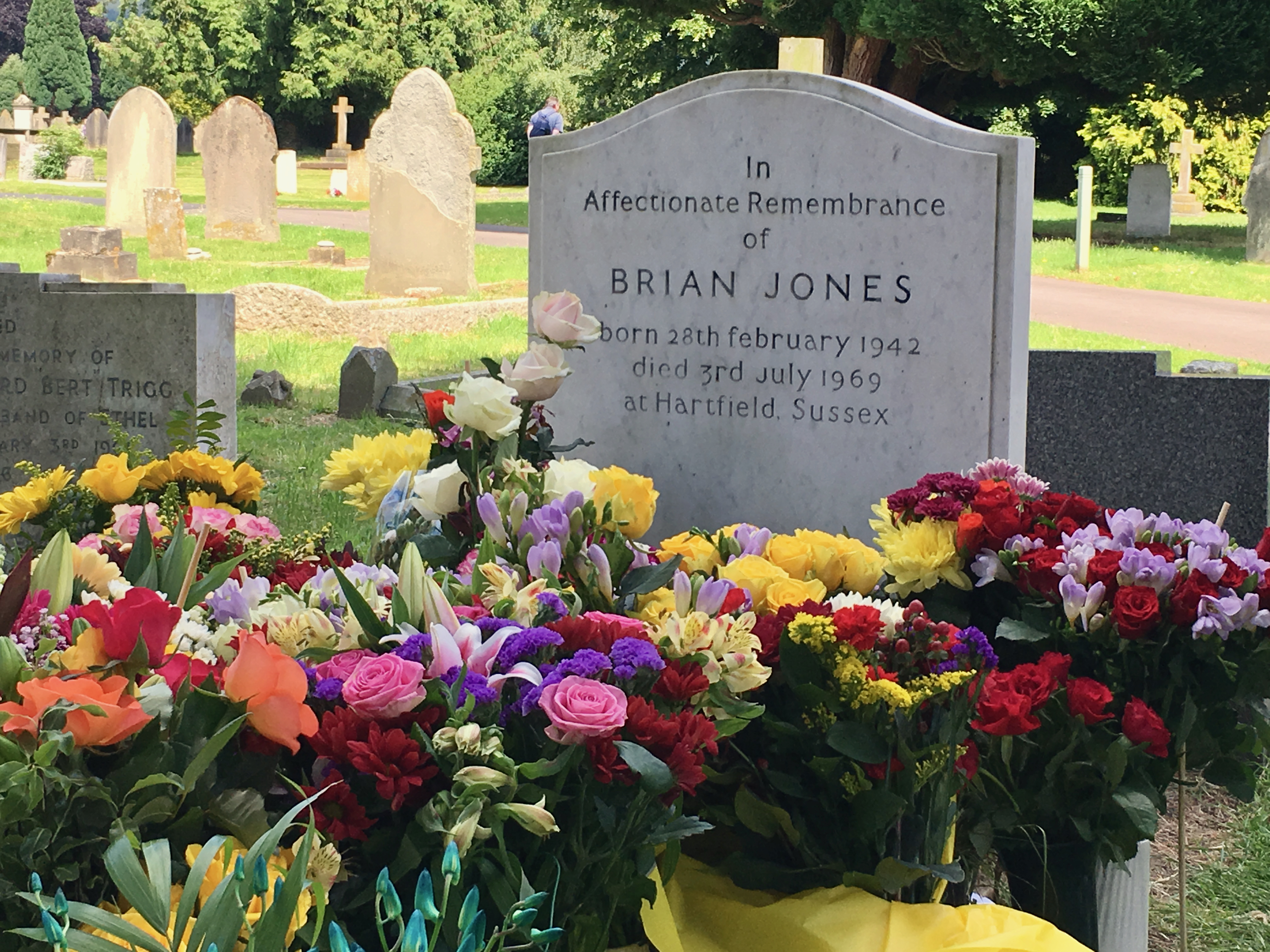
Jones's grave in Cheltenham Cemetery during the 50th anniversary of his death in 2019.

At around midnight on the night of 2–3 July 1969, Jones was discovered motionless at the bottom of his swimming pool at Cotchford Farm. His Swedish girlfriend, Anna Wohlin, was convinced he was alive when he was taken out of the pool, insisting he still had a pulse; however, by the time the doctors arrived, it was too late, and he was pronounced dead on arrival at the hospital at the age of 27. The coroner's report stated it was a drowning, later clarified as "death by misadventure", and noted his liver and heart were greatly enlarged by past drug and alcohol abuse.

Upon Jones's death, the Who's Pete Townshend wrote a poem titled "A Normal Day for Brian, A Man Who Died Every Day" (printed in The Times); Jimi Hendrix dedicated a song to him on US television; and Jim Morrison of the Doors published a poem titled "Ode to L.A. While Thinking of Brian Jones, Deceased". Coincidentally, Hendrix and Morrison both died within the following two years, with Morrison's death falling on the same date as Jones's. All three died at the age of 27.

On 5 July 1969, which was only two days after Jones's death, the Rolling Stones had been scheduled to perform a free concert in Hyde Park. The concert had originally been promoted weeks earlier as the first public appearance of Mick Taylor as the band's new guitarist. The band decided instead to dedicate their upcoming Hyde Park performance to the memory of Jones. At the beginning of the concert, Jagger took the stage to read excerpts from "Adonais", a poem by Percy Bysshe Shelley about the death of his friend John Keats. Stagehands then released hundreds of white butterflies from the stage area as a tribute to Jones. Afterwards, the band played a Johnny Winter song that was one of Jones's favourites, "I'm Yours and I'm Hers", with Taylor on slide guitar.

Watts and Wyman were the only Rolling Stones who attended the funeral. Mick Jagger and Marianne Faithfull were travelling to Australia to begin the filming of Ned Kelly and stated that their contracts did not allow them to delay the trip to attend the funeral.

When asked if he felt guilty about Jones's death, Mick Jagger told Rolling Stone in 1995: "No, I don't really. I do feel that I behaved in a very childish way, but we were very young, and in some ways, we picked on him. But, unfortunately, he made himself a target for it; he was very, very jealous, very difficult, very manipulative, and if you do that in this kind of a group of people, you get back as good as you give, to be honest. I wasn't understanding enough about his drug addiction. No one seemed to know much about drug addiction. Things like LSD were all new. No one knew the harm. People thought cocaine was good for you."

Wyman said in 2002, "As the years go by, I become even more convinced that he's entitled to a free pardon. Brian Jones is a legend, and his legacy is there for all to hear. While the Rolling Stones damaged all of us in some way, Brian was the only one that died."

==== Murder theory ====
Theories surrounding Jones's death developed soon afterwards, with associates of the Stones claiming to have information that he was murdered. According to rock biographer Philip Norman, "the murder theory would bubble back to the surface every five years or so". In 1993, it was reported that Jones was murdered by Frank Thorogood, a builder who was doing construction work on the property. He was the last person to see Jones alive. Thorogood allegedly confessed the murder to the Rolling Stones' driver Tom Keylock, who later denied this. The Thorogood theory was dramatised in the 2005 film Stoned. Thorogood is alleged to have killed Jones in a fight over money; he had been paid £18,000 for work on Cotchford Farm but he wanted another £6,000. The killing is alleged to have been covered up by senior police officers when they discovered how badly the investigation into Jones's death had been botched by the local police.

In August 2009, Sussex Police decided to conduct a case review of Jones's death for the first time since 1969 after new evidence was handed to them by Scott Jones, an investigative journalist, who had traced many of the people who were at Brian Jones's house the night he died. The journalist had also uncovered unseen police files held at the National Archives. In 2010, following the review, Sussex Police said it would not be reopening the case, stating that "this has been thoroughly reviewed by Sussex Police's Crime Policy and Review Branch, but there is no new evidence to suggest that the coroner's original verdict of 'death by misadventure' was incorrect". Jones's children John and Barbara believe that their father was murdered. Barbara appears in the 2019 documentary Rolling Stone: Life and Death of Brian Jones which pushes the theory of the murder.

=== Relationships and fatherhood ===
Jones's first child was born in 1958 to a female friend. The baby, of unknown sex, was given up for adoption and, in contrast to Jones's other children, has either not learned of the relationship to Jones, or has not publicly identified themselves as Jones's child.

In the summer of 1959, Jones's girlfriend – a Cheltenham schoolgirl named Valerie Corbett – became pregnant. Although Jones purportedly encouraged her to have an abortion, she carried the child to term, giving birth on 29 May 1960. She soon placed the baby for adoption. The adoptive parents renamed the boy. In November 1959, Jones went to the Wooden Bridge Hotel in Guildford to see a band perform. He met a young married woman named Angeline, and they had a one-night stand that resulted in her pregnancy. Angeline and her husband decided to raise the baby, born on 4 August 1960. Jones never knew about the pregnancy or the birth. (Note: Wyman uses the pseudonym "Carol" for Belinda in his book Stone Alone.)

On 22 October 1961, Jones's girlfriend Pat Andrews gave birth to his fourth known child, a son. Jones moved in with them and sold his record collection to buy flowers for Andrews and clothes for the newborn. In a television interview, Andrews stated that in the early days of their relationship, although she and Jones were both working, his interest in the guitar meant he did not have much money to buy food or anything beyond paying the rent. According to Andrews, Jones was initially proud of the son, but when the Rolling Stones acquired a manager, Jones was instructed not to be seen with either mother or child. Jones agreed she said, telling her she would have to "put up with it for a few months" until the band had had some success. However, once the Stones did become successful, she noted Jones "just seemed to drift away", becoming more interested in famous people he met, and that she "never received a penny from Brian at all". In the same interview, Andrews also noted she felt sorry for Jones as "he just uses people".

In early 1963, Jones began a relationship with Linda Lawrence. On 23 July 1964, Lawrence gave birth to Jones's fifth child. Later, after his mother's marriage to the Scottish folk/pop singer Donovan, the child was adopted by Donovan and his last name was changed to Leitch, Donovan's last name.

In early October 1964, Jones's occasional girlfriend Dawn Molloy announced to Jones and the Rolling Stones' management that she was pregnant by him. She received a cheque for £700 (equivalent to £11,864 in 2023) from group manager Andrew Loog Oldham. In return, she signed an agreement that the matter was now closed and that she would make no statement about Jones or the child to the public or the press. The undated statement was signed by Molloy and witnessed by Mick Jagger. Molloy eventually gave the boy up for adoption.

In 1965, Jones met German singer Nico and began a three-month relationship with her. Jones introduced Nico to Andy Warhol and recommended she show him her music; through this she later received her role in The Velvet Underground. She became pregnant during the affair but decided to have an abortion in London that same year. The two remained friends.

A year later, while on tour, Jones met Italian-German model and actress Anita Pallenberg backstage and began a significant relationship with her. Jones became extremely abusive, at one point breaking his hand on Pallenberg's face. In 1967, Pallenberg left Jones for his bandmate Keith Richards, which added to tensions between the bandmates.

Jones had subsequent relationships with English model Suki Potier and Swedish dancer Anna Wohlin (1946–2019), as well as a short relationship in 1968 with American model Donyale Luna, who appeared with him in the concert film The Rolling Stones Rock and Roll Circus several months before his death. Wohlin was living with Jones in 1969 when he died and has written two books about her time with him. Wohlin has stated that during his last year Jones had expressed immense guilt over not being there for his children. He wished to start over and become a "real father" and raise future children in the house he had bought. He also wished for his sons who had not been raised by adoptive parents to come and live in the house.

Jones's youngest known child is a daughter, born in 1969 to Elizabeth, a married American woman who raised the girl with her husband.

Wohlin stated in her first book that she miscarried a girl in August 1969.

== Songwriting credits ==
Unsure and insecure as a composer, Jones was not a prolific songwriter. The 30-second "Rice Krispies" jingle for Kellogg's, co-written with the J. Walter Thompson advertising agency in 1963 and performed by the Rolling Stones incognito, was credited to Jones; this did not sit well with the rest of the band, who felt it was a group effort and all should benefit equally. Jones was also included in the "Nanker/Phelge" songwriting credit, a pseudonym used on fourteen tracks that were composed by the entire band and Andrew Oldham.

Oldham tried to establish a songwriting partnership between Jones and Gene Pitney after "becoming bored senseless by Jones's bleating about the potential of half-finished melodies that by no means deserved completion", but after two days of sessions "the results remain best to be unheard, even by Rolling Stones' completists". In 1995, Mick Jagger told Rolling Stone magazine that Jones had been jealous of the Jagger/Richards songwriting team, and added: "To be honest, Brian had no talent for writing songs. None. I've never known a guy with less talent for songwriting."

Faithfull reported that Jones wrote an early version of the melody for "Ruby Tuesday" and presented it to the group. Victor Bockris reported that Richards and Jones worked out the final melody in the studio. Additionally, Jones is credited (along with Richards) for the instrumental piece "Hear It". However, in 1966, Jones composed, produced, and played on the soundtrack to Mord und Totschlag (English title: A Degree Of Murder), an avant-garde German film with Anita Pallenberg, adding the majority of the instrumentation to the soundtrack.

The only known released Jones song is "(Thank You) For Being There", which is a poem by Jones put to music by Carla Olson (who coincidentally has collaborated with Mick Taylor). It appeared on the 1990 album True Voices as performed by Krysia Kristianne and Robin Williamson.

== Other contributions ==
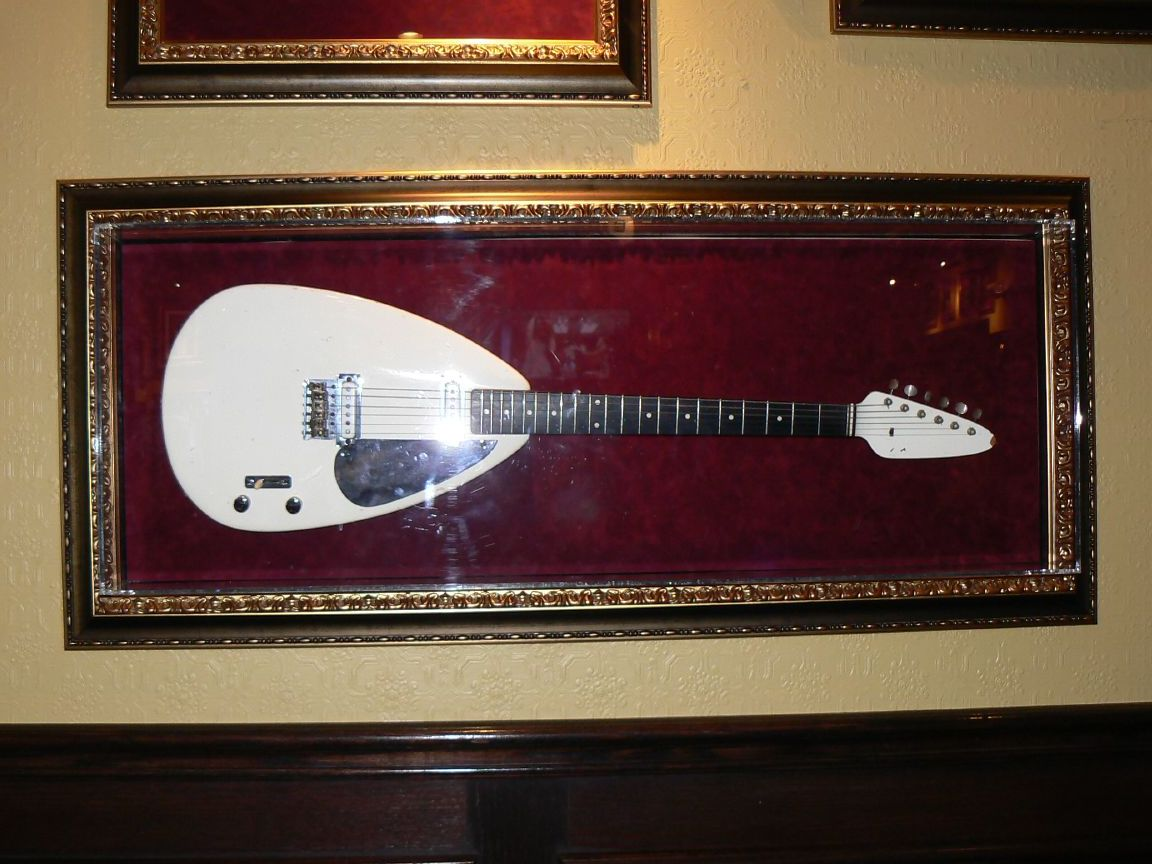
Jones's Vox Mark VI, retired for display

In the summer of 1968, Jones recorded the Morocco-based ensemble, the Master Musicians of Joujouka (Jajouka), which was later used by the band; the recording was released in 1971 as Brian Jones Presents the Pipes of Pan at Joujouka. Brian Jones Presents the Pipes of Pan at Jajouka was rereleased in co-operation with Bachir Attar and Philip Glass in 1995.

In 1967, Jones played alto saxophone on the Beatles song "You Know My Name (Look Up the Number)" on the soundtrack to 'Magical Mystery Tour.

Jones also played percussion on the Jimi Hendrix version of Bob Dylans' song "All Along the Watchtower".

=== Equipment ===
Jones's main guitar in the early years was a Harmony Stratotone, which he replaced with a Gretsch Double Anniversary in two-tone green. His later guitars were mainly new guitars that Gibson would provide: various Gibson Firebird models, a Gibson ES-330 and a Gibson Les Paul.

== Public image and legacy ==
Jones's musicianship, especially in the early days of the Rolling Stones, added much to the singles that propelled the band into the pop charts; it was his fashion sense and his hairstyle, which appealed to both men and women, that were copied by bands on both sides of the Atlantic.

Pallenberg has stated in an interview that Jones wanted to look like Françoise Hardy, loved "dressing up and posing about" and that he would ask her to do his hair and make-up. Bo Diddley described Jones as "a little dude that was trying to pull the group ahead. I saw him as the leader. He didn't take no mess. He was a fantastic cat; he handled the group beautifully."

Jones's death at 27 was the first of the 1960s rock phenomenon of music artists dying at 27. His death was followed within two years by the drug-related deaths of Jimi Hendrix, Jim Morrison, Alan Wilson, and Janis Joplin, all of the same age. The coincidence of their deaths at the same age has been referred to in popular culture as the "27 Club".

When Alastair Johns, who owned Cotchford Farm for over 40 years after Jones's death, refurbished the pool, he sold the original tiles to Jones's fans for £100 each. The sales of the tiles paid for half of the work.

The Psychic TV song "Godstar" is about Jones's death, as are Robyn Hitchcock's "Trash", the Drovers' "She's as Pretty as Brian Jones Was", Jeff Dahl's "Mick and Keith killed Brian", Ted Nugent's "Death by Misadventure", Cameron Winter's "The Rolling Stones", and Salmonblaster's "Brian Jones". Toy Love's song "Swimming Pool" lists several dead rock icons, including Jones (the others are Morrison, Hendrix, and Marc Bolan), just as A House's "Endless Art" does; Jones is also mentioned in De Phazz's song "Something Special". The Master Musicians of Joujouka song "Brian Jones Joujouka Very Stoned" was released in 1974 and 1996. The band Tigers Jaw heavily references Jones and his death in their song "I Saw Water", and pop punk band Groovie Ghoulies released the song "Planet Brian Jones" on a 7" vinyl EP of the same name in 1997. Alvin Youngblood Hart's song "Watchin' Brian Jones" appeared on his 2014 single release Helluva Way (For A Man To Make a Livin'). English group Ultimate Painting recorded "Song For Brian Jones" for their 2016 album Dusk.

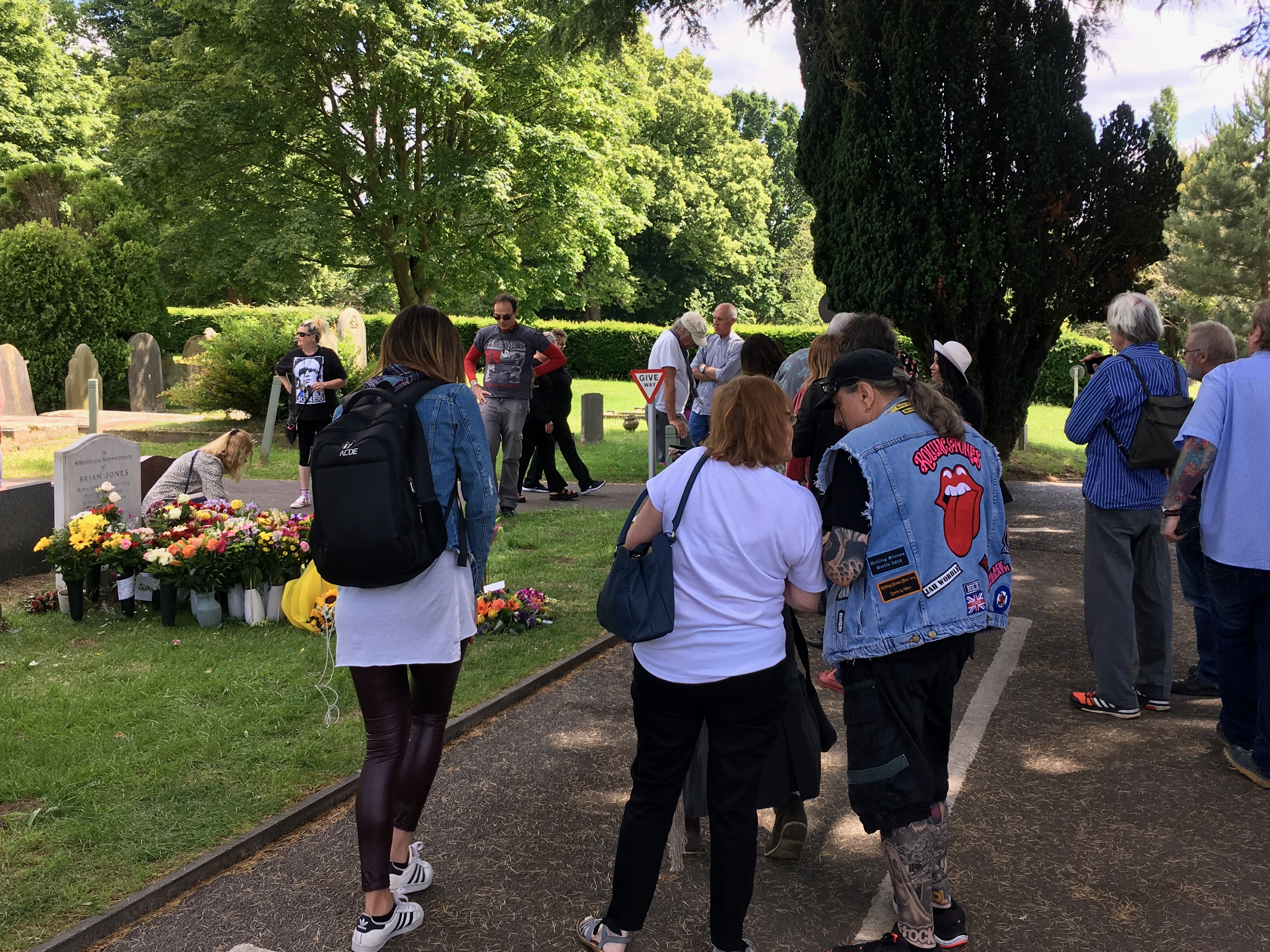
Jones's fans attend the 50th anniversary of his death in 2019.

As of 2023, fans from around the world continue to visit and decorate Jones's grave in Cheltenham.

Many of Jones's contemporaries admit to idolising him as young musicians, including Noel Redding, who, according to Pamela Des Barres's book I'm With the Band, contemplated suicide after hearing about his death. The Brian Jonestown Massacre, an American psychedelic rock band, takes its name partly from Jones and is heavily influenced by his work.

The 2005 film Stoned is a fictionalised account of Jones's death and his role in the Rolling Stones, partly based on Geoffrey Giuliano's book Paint It Black: The Murder of Brian Jones (1994). The part of Brian was played by English actor Leo Gregory.

A fictionalised version of Jones and the tribute concert to him appears in Alan Moore and Kevin O'Neill's The League of Extraordinary Gentlemen, Volume III: Century in its second issue, "Paint it Black". The world of The League of Extraordinary Gentlemen is an alternate universe version of Earth where several works of fiction are real with the fictional characters frequently interacting with each other, with these characters occasionally serving as analogues of historical figures. Jones's fictional stand-in is Basil Fotherington-Tomas from the Nigel Molesworth books (who is now an adult, having grown up since the events in those books, and changed his name to "Basil Thomas") and his band is called "The Purple Orchestra".

Jones's musicianship and contribution to the band are featured heavily in the documentary Crossfire Hurricane. Another documentary, Rolling Stone: Life and Death of Brian Jones, directed by Danny Garcia and distributed by Dudeski and Chip Baker Films, was released in 2020.

== Discography ==
With the Rolling Stones

- The Rolling Stones / England's Newest Hit Makers (1964)
- 12 X 5 (1964)
- The Rolling Stones No. 2 / The Rolling Stones, Now! (1965)
- Out of Our Heads (1965)
- December's Children (And Everybody's) (1965)
- Aftermath (1966)
- Between the Buttons (1967)
- Their Satanic Majesties Request (1967)
- Beggars Banquet (1968)
- Let It Bleed (1969)

With the Beatles

- "Yellow Submarine" (1966) backing vocals, sound effects
- "You Know My Name (Look Up the Number)" (1970, recorded 1967) saxophone

With Peter and Gordon

- "A Mess of Blues" (1964) harmonica
- "You've Had Better Times" (1968) drums

With McGough and McGear

- "Basement Flat" (1968) saxophone
- "Summer with Monica" (1968) saxophone

With Marianne Faithfull

- "Is This What I Get For Loving You?" (1966) euphonium

With the Andrew Oldham Orchestra

- "365 Rolling Stones" (1964) lead vocals, handclaps

With Hapshash and the Coloured Coat

- "Western Flier" (1969) piano, guitar, harmonica

Solo discography

- A Degree of Murder (1967) (soundtrack)
- Brian Jones Presents the Pipes of Pan at Joujouka (1971) (recorded 1968)

== Cited sources ==
- Jackson, Laura (1992). Golden Stone: The Untold Life and Tragic Death of Brian Jones. Smith Gryphon Limited. ISBN 978-0-312-09820-9.
- Jagger, Mick; Richards, Keith; Watts, Charlie; Wood, Ronnie (2003). According to the Rolling Stones. Chronicle Books. ISBN 978-0-297-84332-0.
- Oldham, Andrew Loog (2002). Stoned: A Memoir of London in the 1960s. St. Martin's Press. ISBN 978-0-312-27094-0.
- Richards, Keith; Fox, James (2010). Life. Little, Brown and Company. ISBN 978-0-297-85439-5.
- Wyman, Bill; Coleman, Ray (1997). Stone Alone: The Story of a Rock 'n' Roll Band. Viking. ISBN 978-0-306-80783-1.
- Wyman, Bill; Havers, Richard (2002). Rolling With The Stones. DK Pub. ISBN 978-0-7894-8967-8.
