= The Master Musicians of Joujouka =

Moroccan musical group

- Origin: Jajouka, Morocco
- Genres: Folk music, World, Sufi music of Morocco
- Years active: early 1950s–present
- Labels: Rolling Stones Records, Adelphi, Sub Rosa, Ergot
- Members: See: Members
- Website: Master Musicians of Joujouka official site

The Master Musicians of Joujouka are a collective of Jbala Sufi musicians, serving as a modern representation of a centuries-old music tradition. The collective was first documented by Western journalists in the early 1950s, and was brought to widespread international attention by Brian Jones in 1969. They have collaborated with many Western rock and jazz musicians.

The collective includes more than 50 musicians from the village of Jajouka (sometimes spelled as Joujouka or Zahjouka), in the Rif Mountains of northern Morocco. All members are the sons of previous members, and adopt the surname Attar ("perfume maker"). In the 1990s, the collective split into two factions, with the other currently known as The Master Musicians of Jajouka led by Bachir Attar.

== History ==
The Master Musicians of Joujouka perform a variety of Sufi music that is believed to be more than one thousand years old. The collective became an item of interest for members of the Beat Generation in the 1950s, when Moroccan folklorist Mohamed Hamri informed European colleagues about the group's music. Hamri operated a restaurant in Tangier that was frequented by European musicians and artists, and the Master Musicians often played there. Brion Gysin, Paul Bowles, and William S. Burroughs all wrote about the group and one of them may have coined the name "The Master Musicians of Joujouka" during this period. Timothy Leary famously, but erroneously, described the group and its music as "4000 years old", which has been repeated in many sources. The figure actually applies to previous Sufi traditions and not to the group or its music specifically.

Brian Jones visited the collective many times while traveling in Morocco and in 1969 became the first Western musician to record with them. The album Brian Jones Presents the Pipes of Pan at Joujouka was released in 1971 after Jones's death. The collective played on the 1973 album Dancing in Your Head by Ornette Coleman. Arnold Stahl oversaw recording of the double album Tribe Ahl Serif: Master Musicians of Jajouka in 1974.

In the early 1990s, the collective split into two factions, as first reported by visiting musician Lee Ranaldo. The faction fostered by Mohamed Hamri, and led by Ahmed Attar, retained the name "The Master Musicians of Joujouka". Meanwhile, another faction led by Bachir Attar, whose father had led the group during the Brian Jones period, took on the name "The Master Musicians of Jajouka led by Bachir Attar". The second group attracted protests at concerts in the United Kingdom, and international journalists noted that the schism created discord in the collective's home village. Other journalists and fans conceded that both groups were working to preserve their ancient musical heritage.

The collective retaining the original name, and led by Ahmed Attar, resumed recording in the 1990s, releasing the album Joujouka Black Eyes in 1995. They appeared on the various-artists albums Sufi: Moroccan Trance II in 1996 and 10%: File under Burroughs (a tribute to early supporter William S. Burroughs) the same year. Their most recent studio album is Boujeloud, released in 2006. In 2011 they made a guest appearance on the album The Great Escape Artist by Jane's Addiction. The group frequently appears at music festivals in Europe, and made an acclaimed live appearance at the BBC Radio 4, hosted by Jarvis Cocker, in 2017. The same year the group toured Japan headlining Festival de Frue. In April 2019, they collaborated with the Orb to create the live sound for the Dior Cruise Show in Marrakesh under the musical direction of Michel Gaubert. They continue to operate out of their home village of Jajouka, where they also host an annual festival that is limited to 50 guests. On 30 May 2023, Glastonbury Festival announced that the band would open the main Pyramid Stage at Glastonbury Festival 2023, playing alongside Arctic Monkeys and Guns N' Roses.

== Discography ==
Albums

- Brian Jones Presents the Pipes of Pan at Joujouka (1971)
- Tribe Ahl Serif: Master Musicians of Jajouka (1974)
- Joujouka Black Eyes (1995)
- Boujeloud (2006)
- Into the Ahl Srif: Master Musicians of Joujouka (2015)
- Live in Paris: The Master Musicians of Joujouka 2x vinyl (2021)
