= Jajouka =

Coordinates: 35.022°N 5.728°W

Jajouka, Jahejouka or Zahjoukah (Tifinagh: ⵣⴰⵀⵊⵓⴽⴰ' Arabic: جوجوكة, romanized: Jūjūka or جهجوكة Jahajūka) is a village in the Ahl-Srif mountains in the southern end of the Rif Mountains, Morocco. The mountains are named after the Ahl-Srif tribe who populate the region.

== The musical heritage ==
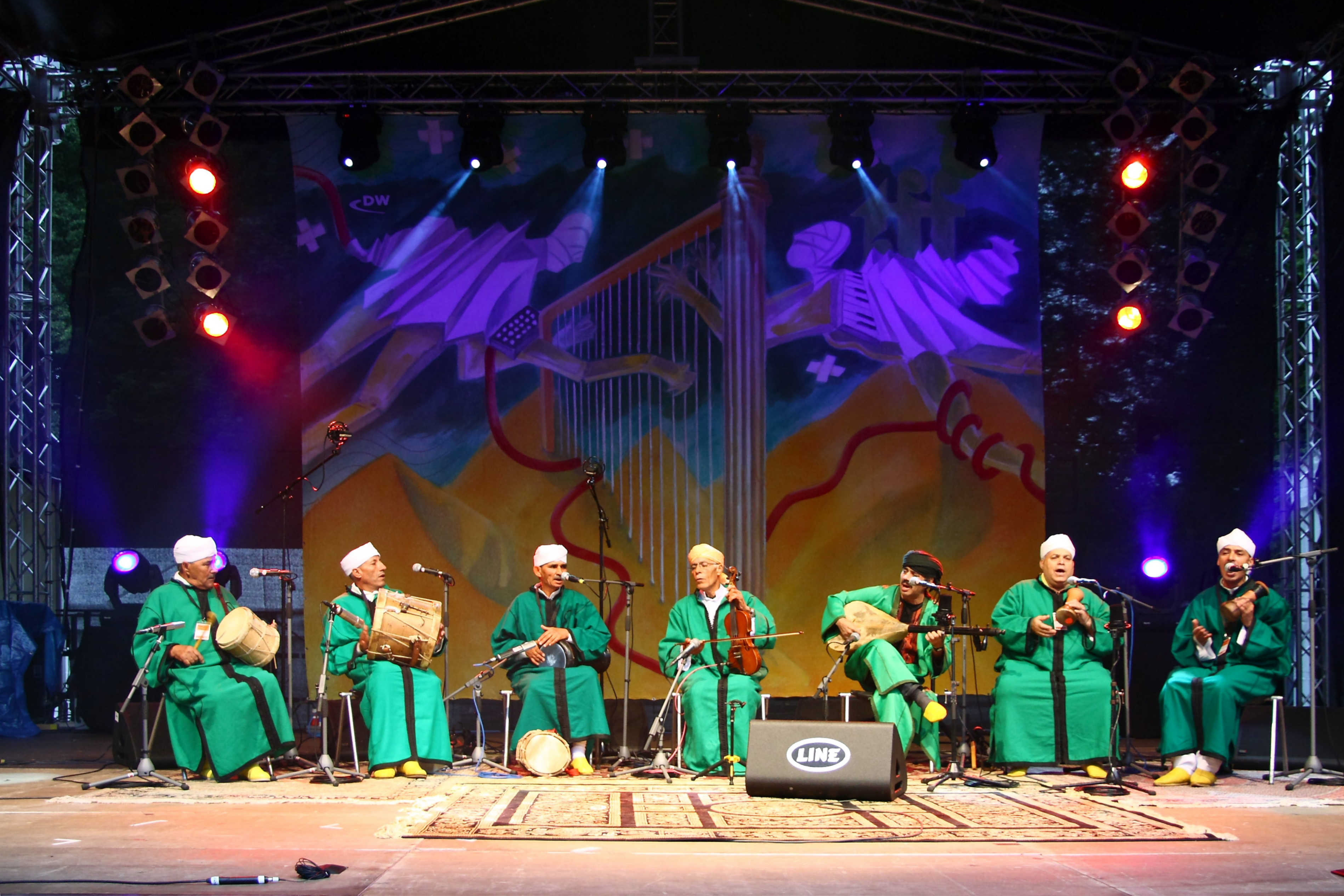
Master Musicians of Jajouka led by Bachir Attar

Jajouka or Zahjouka is well known as home to two Sufi trance musicians groups, The Master Musicians of Jajouka led by Bachir Attar and the Master Musicians of Joujouka managed by Frank Rynne. The music from Jajouka attracted the attention of writers Paul Bowles and William S. Burroughs in the 1950s because the Sufi trance musicians there appeared to still celebrate the rites of the god Pan. Brion Gysin, who had been introduced to the master musicians by Mohamed Hamri, propagated this idea. Gysin linked the village's Boujeloud festival, where a boy sewn in goat skins danced with sticks while the musicians play to keep him at bay, to the ancient "Rites of Pan". In 1967 and 1968 Brian Jones, lead guitarist with The Rolling Stones, visited the village; at the end of his stay, he recorded the musicians for the LP Brian Jones Presents the Pipes of Pan at Joujouka. The LP was released on Rolling Stones Records in 1971, some two years after Jones's death. The record was reissued in 1995 by Point Music. The music from this village attracted an influx of westerners, including some who later recorded there, such as Ornette Coleman and Bill Laswell.

== See also ==
- Jajouka, Something Good Comes to You

== References and notes ==
- Hamri, Mohamed (1975), Tales of Joujouka. Capra Press.
- Palmer, Robert (October 14, 1971). "Jajouka: Up the Mountain". Rolling Stone.
- Davis, Stephen (2001). Old Gods Almost Dead. Broadway Books, 135–37, 172, 195–201, 227; 233–34, 248–53, 270, 354, 504–505, 508.
- Strauss, Neil (October 12, 1995). "The Pop Life: To Save Jajouka, How About a Mercedes in the Village?". The New York Times.
- Davis, Stephen (1993). Jajouka Rolling Stone: A Fable of Gods and Heroes. Random House, ISBN 0-679-42119-X
