= The Baby Snakes =

- Origin: Dublin, Ireland
- Genres: New wave, garage rock
- Years active: 1985–1993
- Labels: FOAD, Santides
- Past members: Frank Rynne; Colin Byrne; Daragh McCarthy; John Bonnie; Ciaran O'Brien; Jeff Nilson; Nigel Preston; Alex Hooper; Anthony O'Neill; Tom Hooper

The Baby Snakes were an Irish rock band formed in 1985. The original line-up featured Frank Rynne, Niall O'Sullivan and Johnny Bonney. In October 1985 they recorded a radio session for Dave Fanning's RTÉ radio show and reached No. 13 in Fanning's Fab 50, an end-of-year listeners poll, in December 1985. Their first L.P., Sweet Hunger, featured Brian Downey from Thin Lizzy on drums. Their second L.P. was produced by Dave Goodman. In 1988, after a BBC Radio 1 session for Janice Long, the band moved to London with new drummer Stephen R Kennedy [now a hydro engineer in France] who previously played in a band headed by Noel Phelan (now a house DJ) where they played a mix of underground venues as well as The Marquee.

== Discography ==
- Song "Johnny" – Various Artists – Weird Weird World of Guru Weirdbrain LP – Hotwire Records – HWLP8505 – IRL – 1985
- Songs for Subliminal Kids EP 7" – Santides Records – SAN 0057 – IRL – 1987
- This City Sucks (live) – Cassette FOAD Records – ??? – January 1988
- Sweet Hunger LP FOAD Records – FOAD 7 – June 1988 Produced by Ian Bryon and Paul Thomas.
- Rebel Radio LP – Santides Records – SAN0089 – July 1990 Produced by Dave Goodman
- Looking for Strange (Cassette) – Santides, 1990
- Four Foot Tapping Greats EP 7" – Santides Records – SUE 66 – UK – 1992 Four Johnny Cash covers, 2 recorded in mono.
