= Greater ritual of the pentagram =

Esoteric ritual

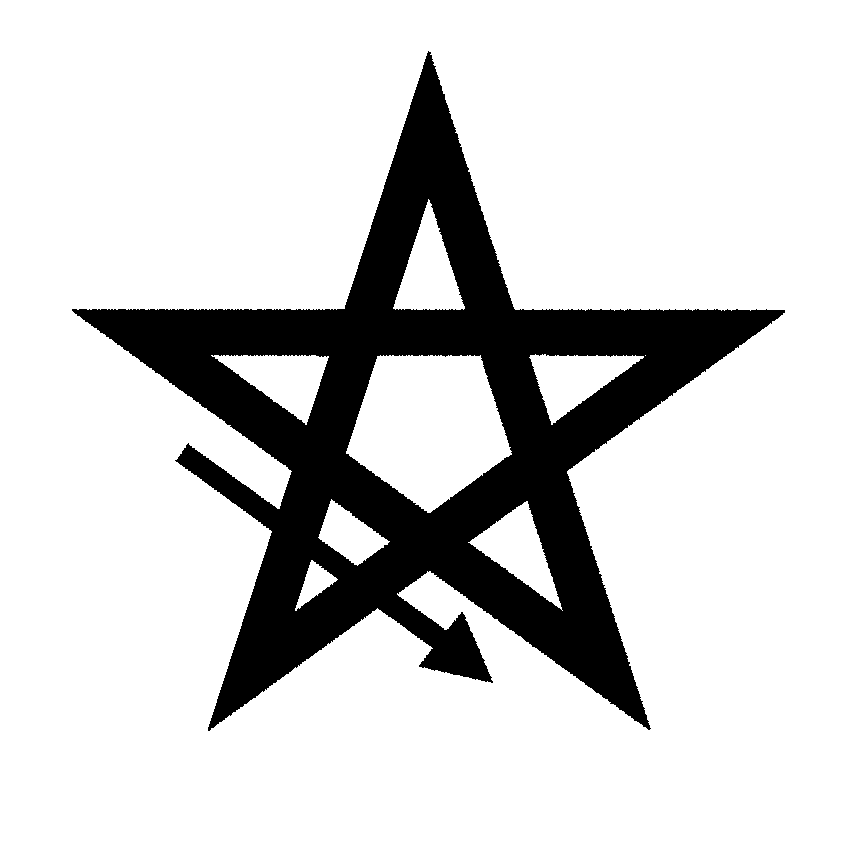
The Spirit Banishing Closing Active Pentagram of the GRP, traced from the top left corner to the bottom right corner.

The greater ritual of the pentagram (GRP), or the supreme ritual of the pentagram (SRP) as referred to by Israel Regardie in his book The Golden Dawn. The ritual was written and used by members of the Hermetic Order of the Golden Dawn. There is also an version of the ritual written by Aleister Crowley, wherein he includes aspects from the Golden Dawn's lesser ritual of the hexagram and his religion Thelema. The name "greater ritual of the pentagram" comes from this writing of Crowley, as Israel Regardie only refers to it as the "supreme ritual of the pentagram".

== Description and structure ==
The greater ritual of the pentagram involves the banishing or invocation of each element individually for each cardinal direction, going through water, fire, earth and air, with spirit performed after each 90° turn.

As with the lesser ritual of the pentagram, the points of the pentagram are represented by different alchemical symbols or god-names (i.e. YHVH, Eheieh), as well as also having each angle being represented by animals or astrological signs.

Symbols and astrological signs are attributed to each angle of the pentagram.

Aleister Crowley mentions in his writing on the greater ritual that the lesser ritual places the magician on the sefirot's path of samech, whilst the greater ritual places the magician upon the path of gimel. This is makes it so that the Qabalistic cross of the ritual is performed above Tipareth whereas in the lesser ritual it would be performed below, allowing each cardinal direction in the lesser ritual to be represented by the archangels: East (Tipareth) being Raphael, west (Yesod) being Gabriel, north (Hod) being Michael, and south (Netzach) being Auriel. Though in the ritual, this isn't the case as Michael is the right hand (south) and Auriel is the left hand (north).

The greater ritual of the pentagram has several different pentagrams, invoking and banishing for each element, as well as each having unique god-names. The banishing form of a pentagram is the reverse current of the invoking form (i.e. top left to top right → top right to top left).

The ritual can also be used for invoking or banishing the zodiacal forces.

== The ritual ==
=== Equipment ===
- Ritual dagger, or wand in some cases.
- Tau robes, or any other suitable robe that may be worn by the magician.

However, as with the lesser ritual as well, these implements are often begotten and the magicians index finger is used as a replacement for the dagger. Unlike the lesser ritual, there is no mention of an altar being used but instead a circle that is drawn on the ground.

David Cherubim notes that Crowley deems this ritual unsatisfactory unless there be a properly made circle marked with the hexagram drawn within and six lamps at each point. It appears a bell is used within Crowley's version of the ritual. Crowley's ritual also includes that the magician must anoint their body in holy oil before performing it.

=== Procedure ===
The pentagrams will be traced in front of the magician in the air, and the accompanying god-names shall be said. The beginning and ending of each ritual is done with the Qabalistic cross. Israel Regardie details one variation of the Greater Invoking Ritual within the book The Golden Dawn, and Aleister Crowley also described a greater invoking ritual of the pentagram. David Cherubim notes that Crowley combines aspects of the Golden Dawn's ritual of the hexagram, notably making each 60° rotation be represented by a sphere of the sefirah and the accompanying planet.

== See also ==
- Archangel
- Aleister Crowley
- Hermetic Order of the Golden Dawn
- Lesser ritual of the pentagram
- Kabbalah
- Israel Regardie
- Sefirot
- Thelema
