= Ritual purification =

Bathing or washing as a religious ritual

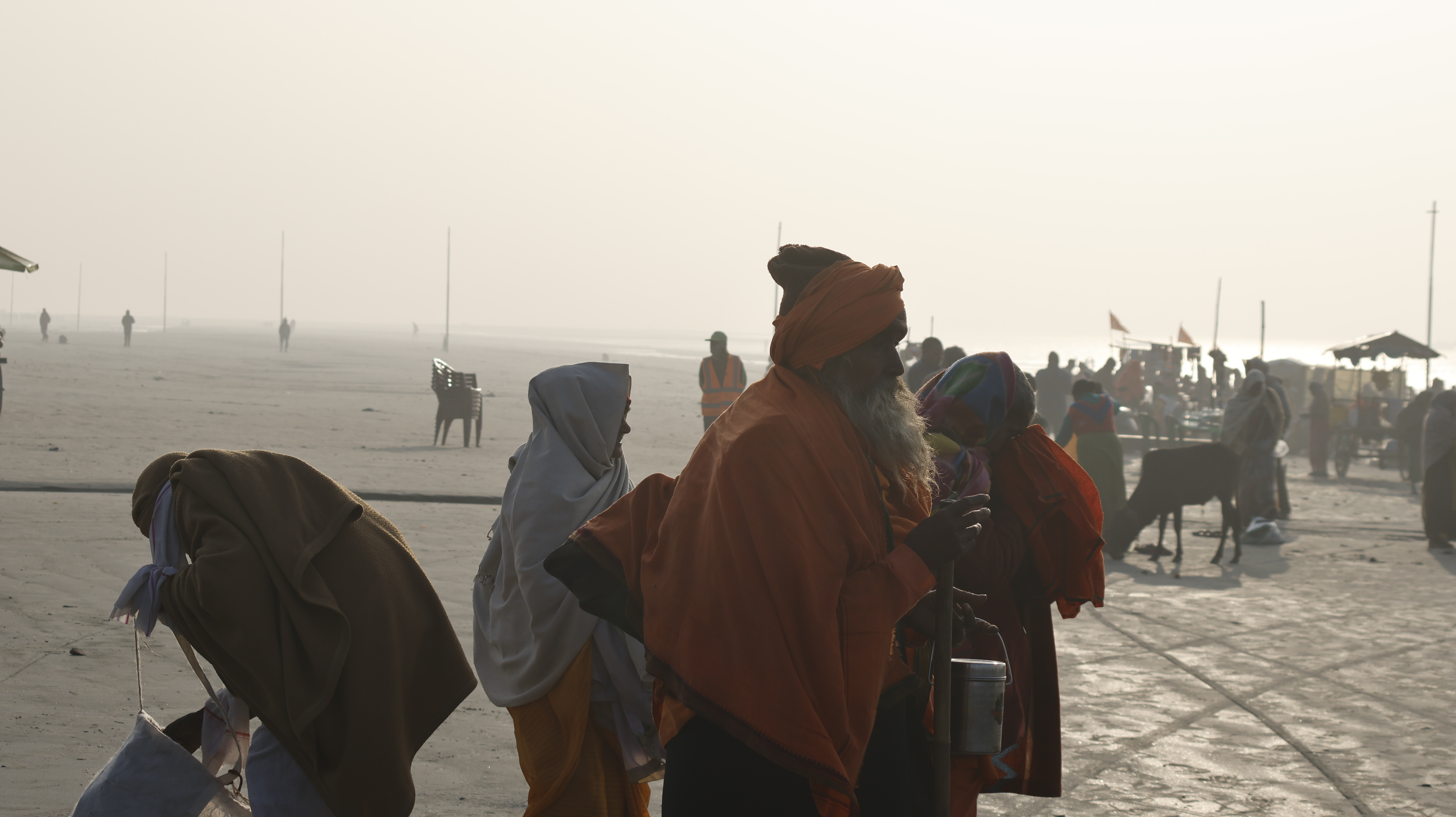
Priests taking dip in Ganges, a river considered holy in Hinduism as a part of ritual purification

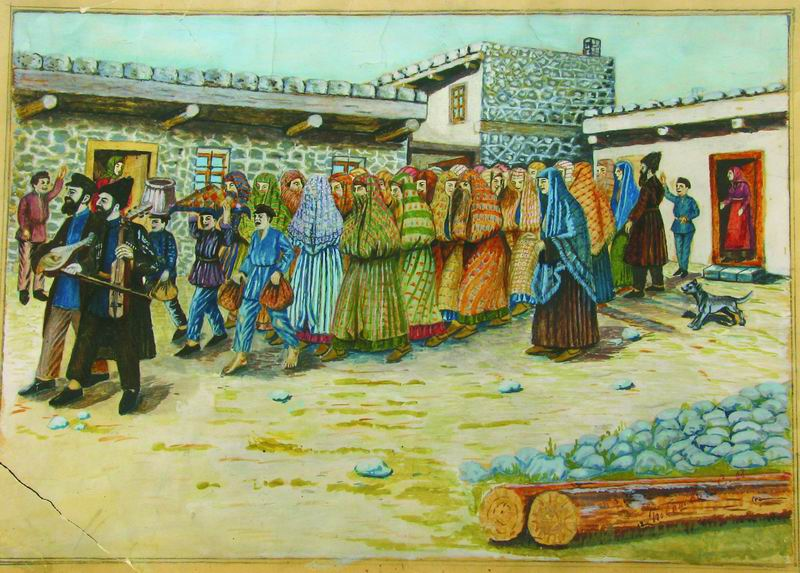
Taking the bride to the bath house, Shalom Koboshvili, 1939

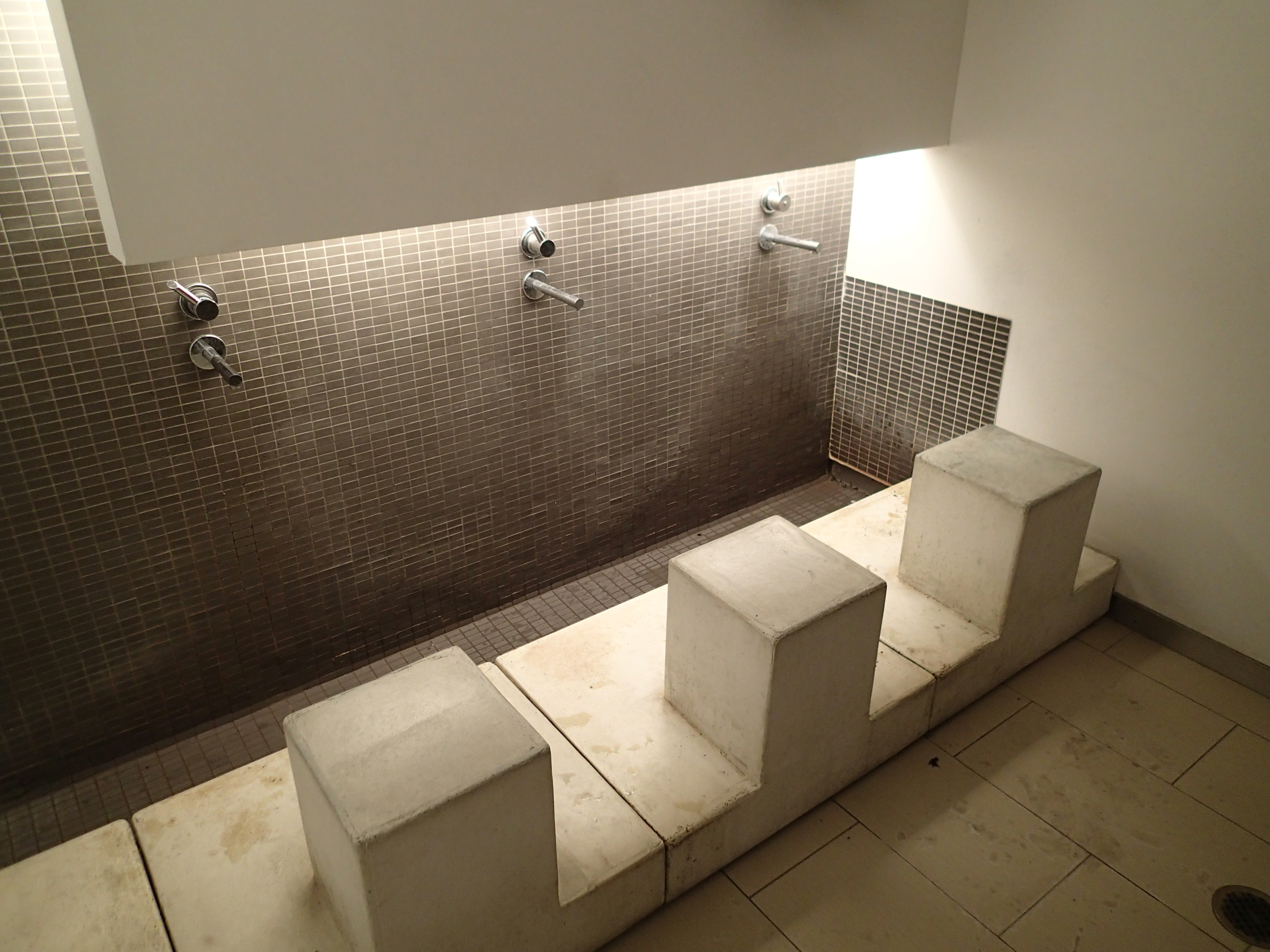
Male Wudu Facility at University of Toronto's Multifaith Centre

Ritual purification is a religious practice through which a person, object, or place is considered to be freed of ritual impurity, especially prior to worship or contact with the sacred. Important distinctions exist between states of ritual impurity and ordinary physical impurity, such as dirt or lack of hygiene, although the ritualistic processes of purification may involve washing, ablution, or other prescribed rites. Within some traditional or religious contexts, ritual purification may also apply to objects and places. Some may consider purity with stronger association with worship, bodily states, moral order, or boundaries.

While practices of ritual purification are prevalent among many religious traditions, their meaning, scope, and function behind rituals may vary across historical and theological contexts. In some traditions, rites of purification form part of a broader system of ritual purity that holds the role of governing access to sacred persons, objects, or spaces. In others, purification may appear in more limited liturgical or preparatory forms and can be confined to particular ceremonial purposes. Shaped by the legal, theological, and historical contexts in which it is defined and practiced, the meaning and significance of ritual purification vary across traditions.

== Ancient Rome ==
The ancient Romans performed ablutions as part of their religious and daily practices, often using water to purify themselves before engaging in sacred rites. Macrobius mentions the ritualistic use of ablutions in his work Saturnalia, highlighting their role in maintaining spiritual purity. Similarly, Ovid references ablutions in his Fasti, describing their importance during religious festivals and ceremonies. These practices underscored the significance of cleanliness and ritual purity in Roman culture.

Modern practitioners of the ancient Roman religion, such as those in the Pietas Comunità Gentile and Nova Roma community, continue to observe ablutions as part of their reconstructed rituals, emphasizing continuity with traditional Roman customs.

== Baháʼí Faith ==
In the Baháʼí Faith, ritual ablutions (the washing of the hands and face) should be done before the saying of the obligatory prayers, as well as prior to the recitation of the Greatest Name 95 times. Menstruating women are obliged to pray, but have the (voluntary) alternative of reciting a verse instead; if the latter choice is taken, ablutions are still required before the recital of the special verse. Bahá'u'lláh, the founder of the Baháʼí Faith, prescribed the ablutions in his book of laws, the Kitáb-i-Aqdas.

These ablutions have a significance beyond washing and should be performed even if one has bathed oneself immediately before reciting the obligatory prayer; fresh ablutions should also be performed for each devotion, unless they are being done at the same time. If no water (or clean water) is available or if an illness would be worsened by the use of water, one may instead repeat the verse "In the Name of God, the Most Pure, the Most Pure" five times before the prayer.

Apart from this, Bahá'u'lláh abolished all forms of ritual impurity of people and things, following Báb who stressed the importance of cleanliness and spiritual purity.

== Buddhism ==
Purification in Buddhism takes different forms across sectarian and regional contexts. In Buddhist monastic settings, practices such as bathing, washing, mouth cleaning, and shaving were often regulated through disciplinary texts and formed part of the daily order of monastic life; these practices were understood not only as matters of bodily care, but also as aspects of discipline, conduct, and communal identity within the Buddhist monastic community (sangha.) The branch of Theravāda places particular emphasis on monastic regulation and disciplined daily practice, while Mahāyāna and Vajrayāna traditions, sharing the broader Buddhist teachings of moral and mental cultivation, developed distinct ritual and sacred-space forms in accordance with their own doctrinal and liturgical frameworks. Despite these differences, all three branches are directed toward broader forms of spiritual cultivation. Purification in Buddhism is therefore better understood as a varied group of practices shaped by monastic rules, ritual setting, branch tradition, and local custom rather than as a single rite common to all Buddhist communities. These differences are also reflected in regional Buddhist practice, especially in East and Southeast Asia.

=== Japanese Buddism ===
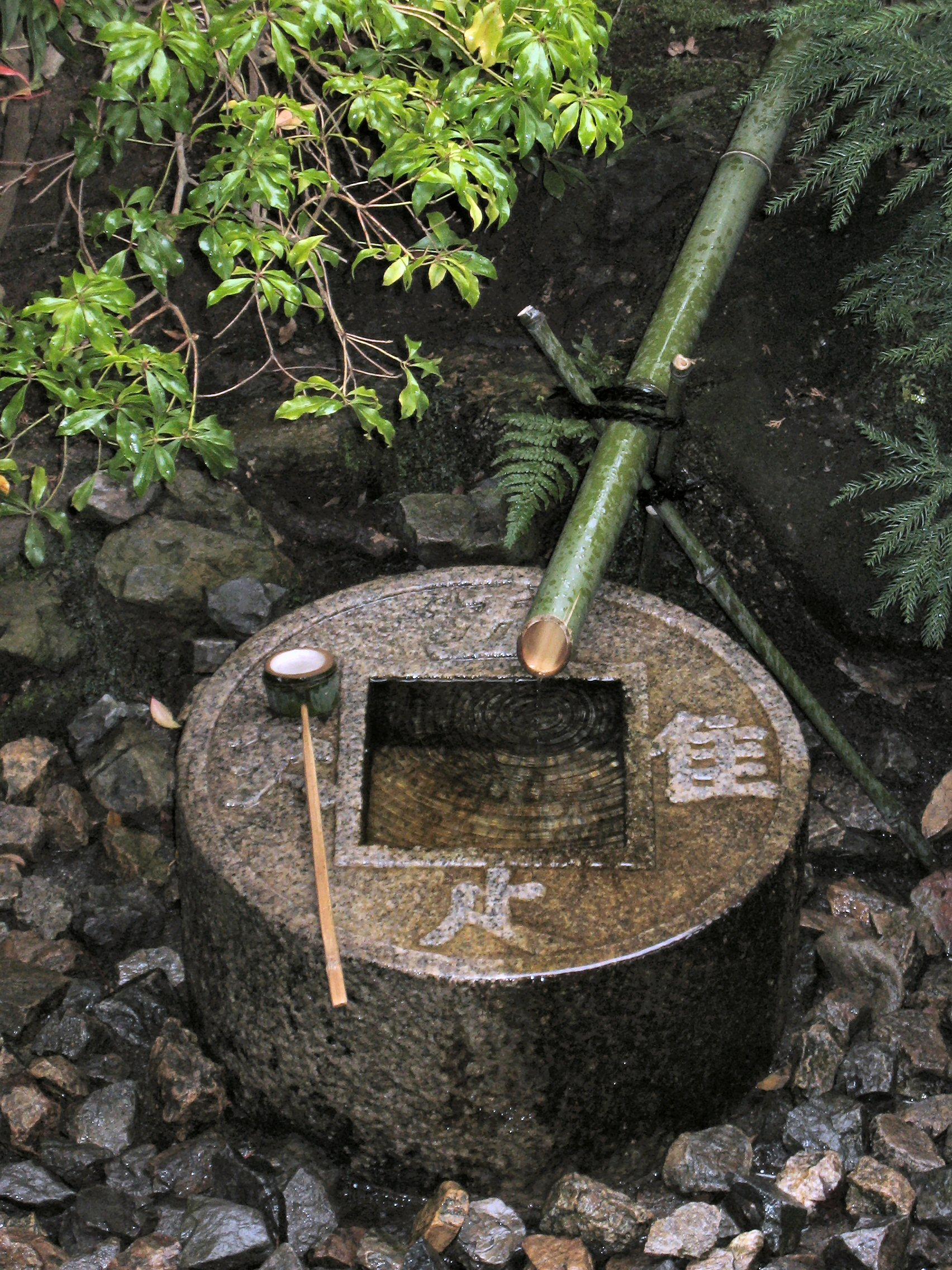
Tsukubai at Ryōan-ji temple in Kyoto

In Japanese Buddhism, a basin called a tsukubai is provided at Buddhist temples for ablutions, and similar basins are also used in the context of tea ceremony. This form of ritual cleansing is the custom for guests attending a tearoom or the grounds of a Buddhist temple. The name derives from a verb meaning "to crouch" or "to bow down", and the practice is linked to humility as well as bodily preparation. Tsukubai are usually of stone and are often supplied with water through a bamboo pipe and used with a small ladle. A supply of water may be provided via a bamboo pipe called a kakei.

The famous tsukubai shown here stands in the grounds of the Ryōan-ji temple in Kyoto, and was donated by the feudal lord Tokugawa Mitsukuni. Read together with the character 口 (kuchi ) at the center of the basin, the four kanji characters form the phrase ware tada taru o shiru (吾 = ware = I, 唯 = tada = only, 足 = taru = plenty, 知 = shiru = know), often translated as "I only know plenty" or "one should learn to be content." The inscription is frequently associated with Buddhist themes of restraint and non-attachment.

== Christianity ==
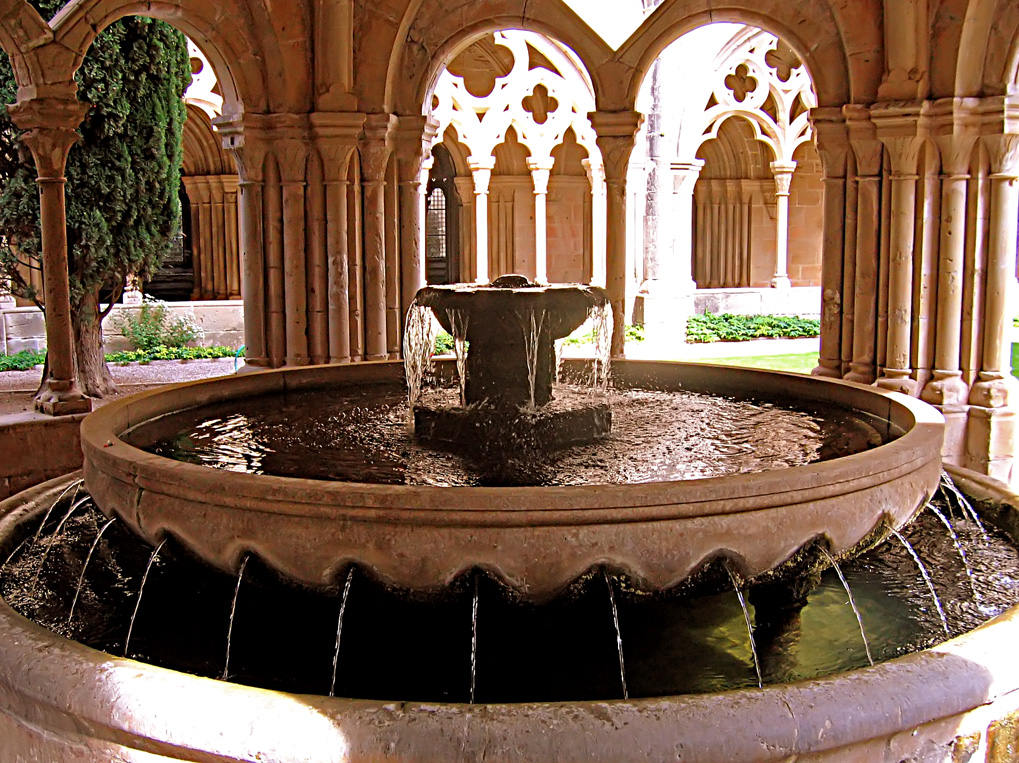
Lavabo in the Poblet Monastery in Spain

The Pentateuch (the first five books of the Old Testament) prescribes many rituals of purification relating to menstruation, childbirth, sexual relations, nocturnal emission, unusual bodily fluids, skin disease, death, and animal sacrifices. Oriental Orthodox Churches such as the Coptic Orthodox, Ethiopian Orthodox, and Eritrean Orthodox, place a heavier emphasis on Old Testament teachings, and its followers adhere to certain practices such as observing days of ritual purification. Before praying, they wash their hands and face in order to be clean before and present their best to God.

The Ethiopian Orthodox Tewahedo Church prescribes several kinds of hand washing for example after leaving the latrine, lavatory or bathhouse, or before prayer, or after eating a meal. The women in the Ethiopian Orthodox Tewahedo Church are prohibited from entering the church temple during menses; and the men do not enter a church the day after they have had intercourse with their wives.

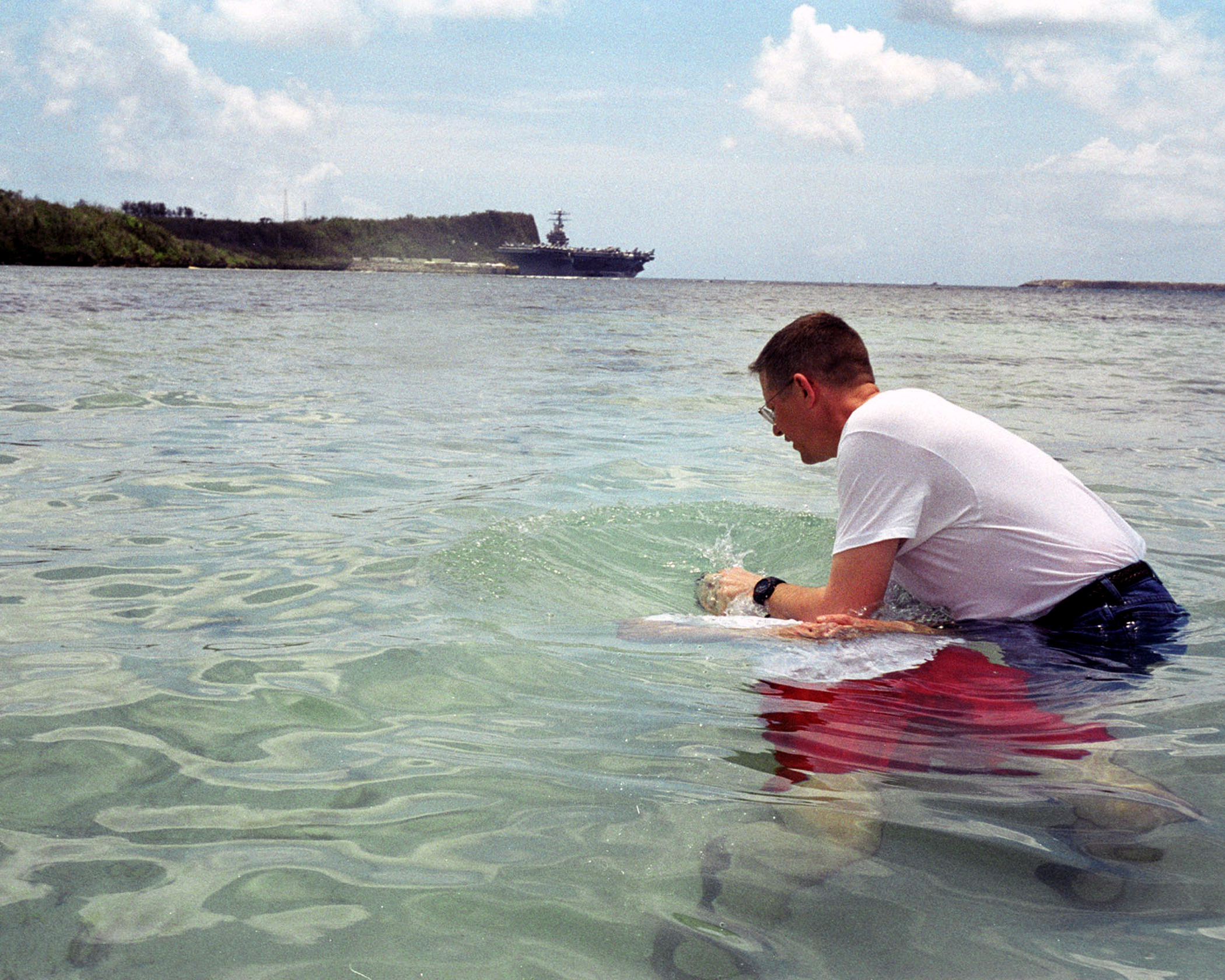
Baptismal ceremony on Easter Sunday

Baptism, as a form of ritual purification, occurs in several religions related to Judaism, and most prominently in Christianity; Christianity also has other forms of ritual purification. Many Christian churches practice a ceremony of the Washing of Feet, following the example of Jesus in the Gospel. Some interpret this as an ordinance which the church is obliged to keep as a commandment, see also Biblical law in Christianity. Others interpret it as an example that all should follow. Most denominations that practice the rite will perform it on Maundy Thursday. Often in these services, the bishop will wash the feet of the clergy, and in monasteries the Abbot will wash the feet of the brethren.

Many ancient churches were built with a large fountain in the courtyard. It was the tradition for Christians to wash before entering the church for worship. This usage is also legislated in the Rule of St. Benedict, as a result of which, many medieval monasteries were built with communal lavers for the monks or nuns to wash up before the Daily Office. Catholic religious orders of the Augustinians' and Benedictines' rules contained ritual purification, and inspired by Benedict of Nursia encouragement for the practice of therapeutic bathing; Benedictine monks played a role in the development and promotion of spas.

The requirement that a Catholic priest wash his hands before saying Mass began as a practical precaution of cleanness, which was also interpreted symbolically. "In the third century there are traces of a custom of washing the hands as a preparation for prayer on the part of all Christians, and from the fourth century onwards it appears to have been usual for the ministers at the Catholic mass or divine liturgy to ceremonially wash their hands before the more solemn part of the service as a symbol of inward purity."

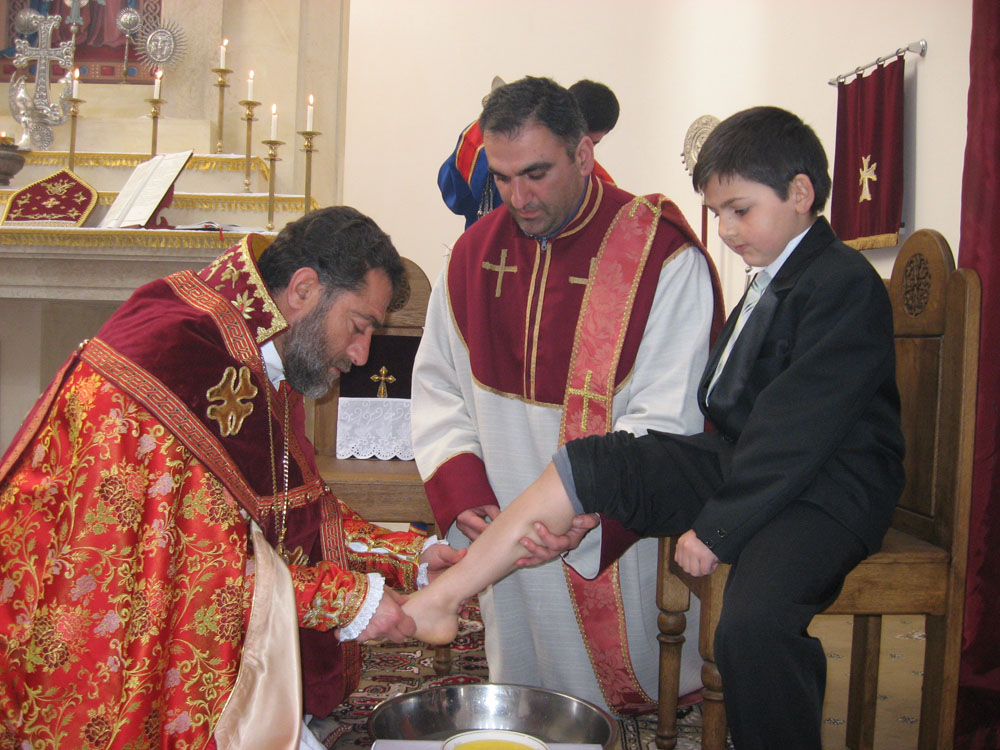
Bishop Sebouh Chouldjian of the Armenian Apostolic Church washing the feet of children

Traditionally, Christianity adhered to the biblical regulation requiring the purification of women after childbirth; this practice, was adapted into a special ritual known as the churching of women, for which there exists liturgy in the Church of England's Book of Common Prayer, but its use is now rare in Western Christianity. The churching of women is still performed in a number of Eastern Christian churches (Eastern Orthodox, Oriental Orthodox and Eastern Catholic churches).

A cantharus is a fountain used by Christians for ablution before entering a church. These ablutions involve the washing of the hands, face, and feet. The cantharus is traditionally located in the exonarthex of the church. The water emitted by a cantharus is to be running water. The practice of ablutions before prayer and worship in Christianity symbolizes "separation from sins of the spirit and surrender to the Lord." Eusebius recorded this practice of canthari located in the courtyards of churches, for the faithful to wash themselves before entering a Christian house of worship. The practice has its origins in Jewish practice of performing ablutions before entering into the presence of God (cf. Exodus 30:17–21). Though cantharus are not as prevalent anymore in Western Christianity, they are found in Eastern Christian and Oriental Christian churches. However, in the Latin liturgical rites of the Catholic Church, worshippers sprinkle themselves with holy water before entering the nave of the Church or approaching the altar.

In Reformed Christianity, ritual purity is achieved through the Confession of Sins, Assurance of Forgiveness, and Sanctification. Through the power of the Holy Spirit, believers offer their whole being and labor as a 'living sacrifice'; and cleanliness becomes a way of life (See Romans 12:1, and John 13:5-10 (the Washing of the Feet)). Prior to praying the canonical hours at seven fixed prayer times, Oriental Orthodox Christians wash their hands, face and feet (cf. Agpeya, Shehimo).

The use of water in many Christian countries is due in part to the Biblical toilet etiquette which encourages washing after all instances of defecation. The bidet is common in predominantly Catholic countries where water is considered essential for anal cleansing, and in some traditionally Orthodox and Lutheran countries such as Greece and Finland respectively, where bidet showers are common.

== Hinduism ==
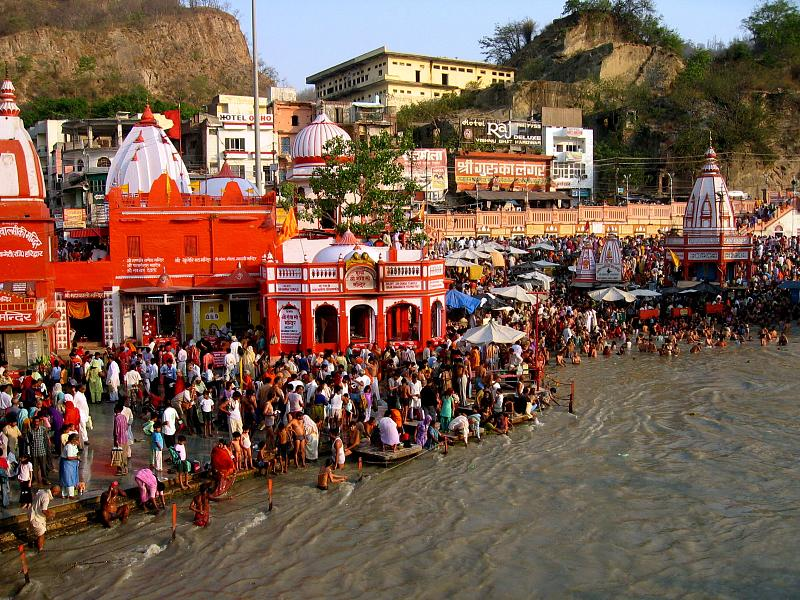
Devotees taking holy bath during festival of Ganga Dashahara at Har Ki Pauri, Haridwar

Various traditions within Hinduism follow different standards of ritual purity and purification. Within each tradition the more orthodox groups follow stricter rules, but the strictest rules are generally prescribed for Brahmins, especially those engaged in the temple worship.

An important part of ritual purification in Hinduism is the bathing of the entire body, particularly in rivers considered holy such as the Ganges. It is considered auspicious to perform this method of purification before festivals after a death, in order to maintain purity.

Punyahavachanam is a ritual meant to purify one's self and one's home, usually performed before important occasions, like weddings. During the ceremony, mantras are chanted and then consecrated water is sprinkled over all of the participants and the items used.

In the ritual known as abhisheka (Sanskrit, "sprinkling; ablution"), the deity's murti or image is ritually bathed with water, curd, milk, honey, ghee, cane sugar, rosewater, etc. Abhisheka is also a special form of puja prescribed by Agamic injunction. The act is also performed in the inauguration of religious and political monarchs and for other special blessings. The murtis of deities must not be touched without cleansing the hands, and one is not supposed to enter a temple without a bath.

Sūtaka are the Hindu rules of impurity to be followed after the birth of a child (vṛddhi sūtaka). Sūtaka involves the practice of keeping socially isolated from relatives and community by abstention of mealtaking with family, engaging in customary religious activities, and leaving the home. A mother must practice sūtaka for 10 to 30 days, depending upon her varna, while the father may become purified immediately after the birth of his child by ritual purification (ritual bathing).

There are various kinds of purificatory rituals associated with death ceremonies. After visiting a house where a death has recently occurred, Hindus are expected to take baths.

Women take a head bath after completing their four-day menstrual period.

== Indigenous American religions ==
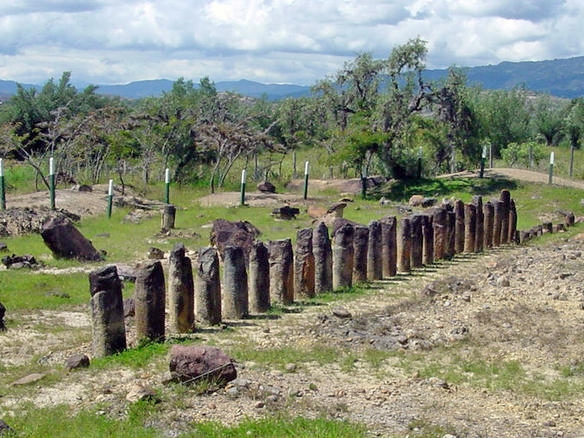
El Infiernito ("The Little Hell") Ruins of an ancient Muisca shrine, place of purification rituals

In the traditions of many Indigenous peoples of the Americas, one of the forms of ritual purification is the ablutionary use of a sauna, known as a sweatlodge, as preparation for a variety of other ceremonies. The burning of smudge sticks is also believed by some indigenous groups to cleanse an area of any evil presence. Some groups like the southeastern tribe, the Cherokee, practiced and, to a lesser degree, still practice going to water, performed only in moving bodies of water such as rivers or streams. Going to water was practiced by some villages daily (around sunrise) while others would go to water primarily for special occasions, including but not limited to naming ceremonies, holidays, and ball games. Many anthropologists that studied with the Cherokees like James Adair tried to connect these groups to the Lost Tribes of Israel based on religious practices including going to water, but this form of historiography is mostly Christian "wish fulfillment" rather than respectable anthropology.

Yuquot Whalers' Shrine on Vancouver Island was used by chiefs to prepare ritually for whaling.

== Islam ==
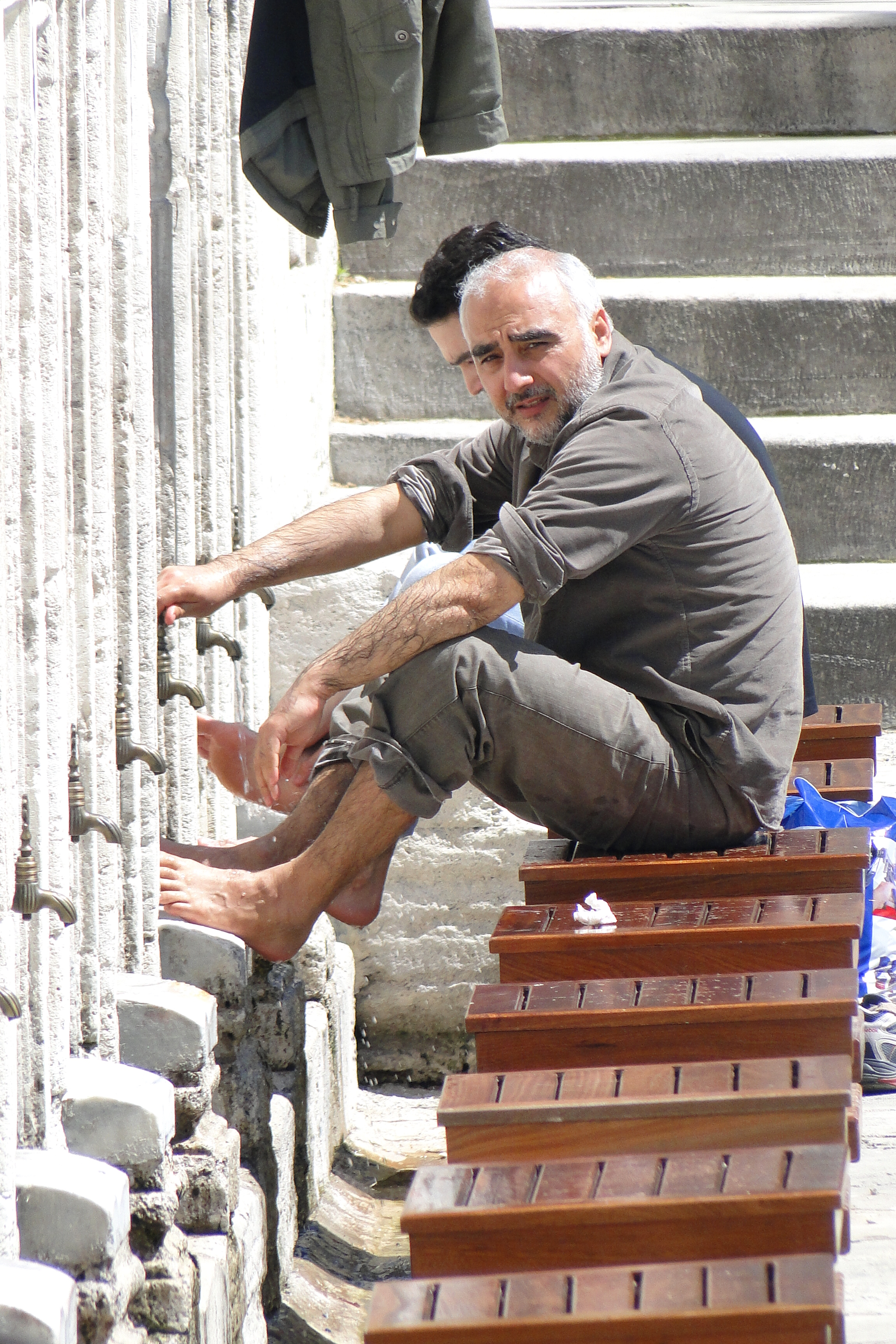
People washing their feet before prayer at Süleymaniye Mosque in Istanbul, Turkey

Islamic ritual purification is particularly centred on the preparation for salah, ritual prayer; theoretically ritual purification would remain valid throughout the day, but is treated as invalid on the occurrence of certain acts, flatulence, sleep, contact with the opposite sex (depending on which school of thought), unconsciousness, and the emission of blood, semen, or vomit. Some schools of thought mandate that ritual purity is necessary for holding the Quran.

Ritual purification takes the form of ablution, wudu and ghusl, depending on the circumstance; the greater form is obligatory by a woman after she ceases menstruation, on a corpse that did not die during battle, and after sexual activity, and is optionally used on other occasions, for example just prior to Friday prayers or entering ihram.

An alternative tayammum ("dry ablution"), involving clean sand or earth, is used if clean water is not available or if an illness would be worsened by the use of water; this form is invalidated in the same circumstances as the other forms, and also whenever water becomes available and safe to use.

The fard or "obligatory activities" of the lesser form include beginning with the intention to purify oneself, washing of the face, arms, head, and feet. while some mustahabb "recommended activities" also exist such as basmala recitation, oral hygiene, washing the mouth, nose at the beginning, washing of arms to the elbows and washing of the ears at the end; additionally recitation of the Shahada. The greater form (ghusl) is completed by first performing wudu and then ensuring that the entire body is washed. Some minor details of Islamic ritual purification may vary between different madhhabs "schools of thought".

== Judaism ==
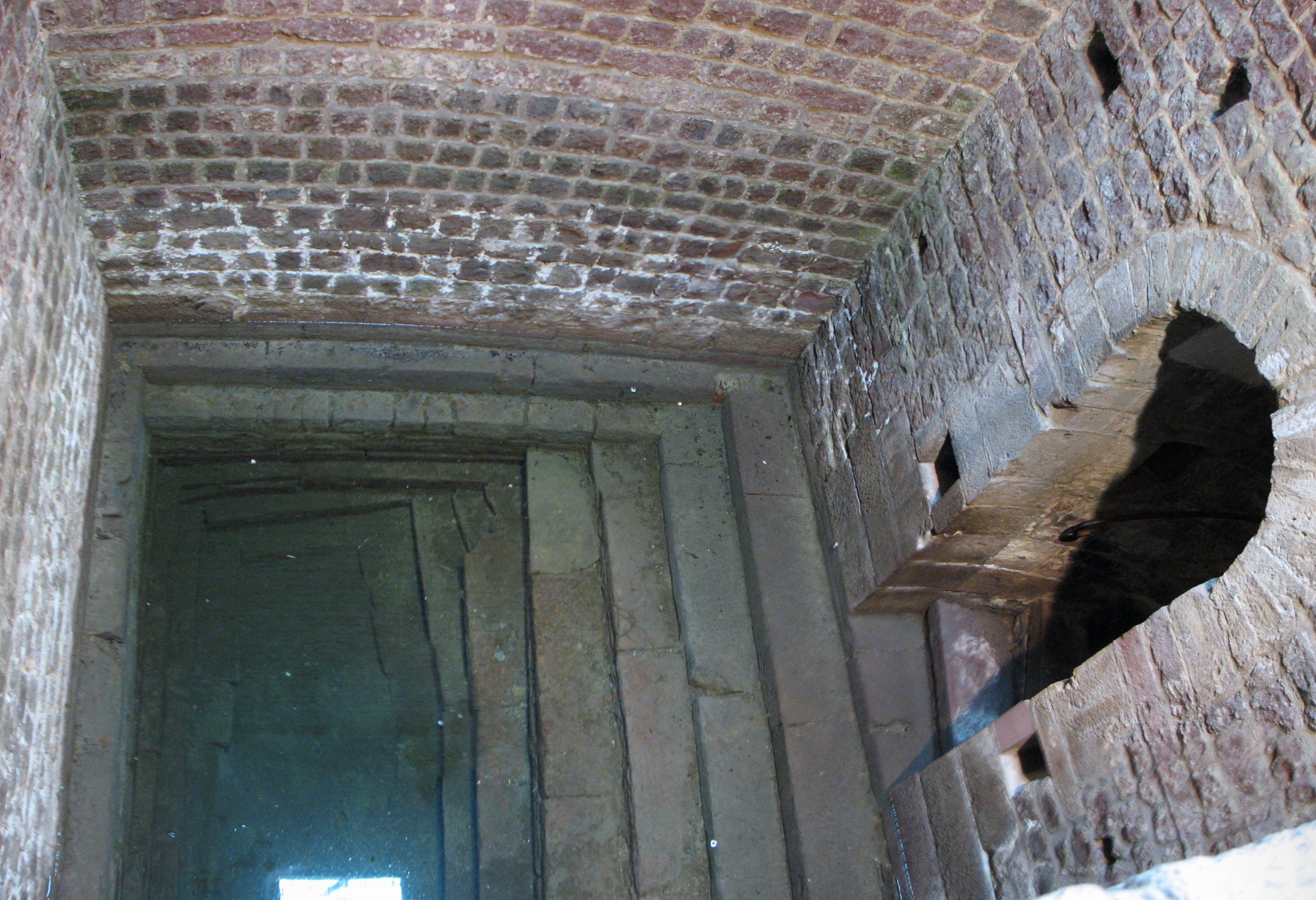
Pool of a medieval mikvah in Speyer, dating to 1128

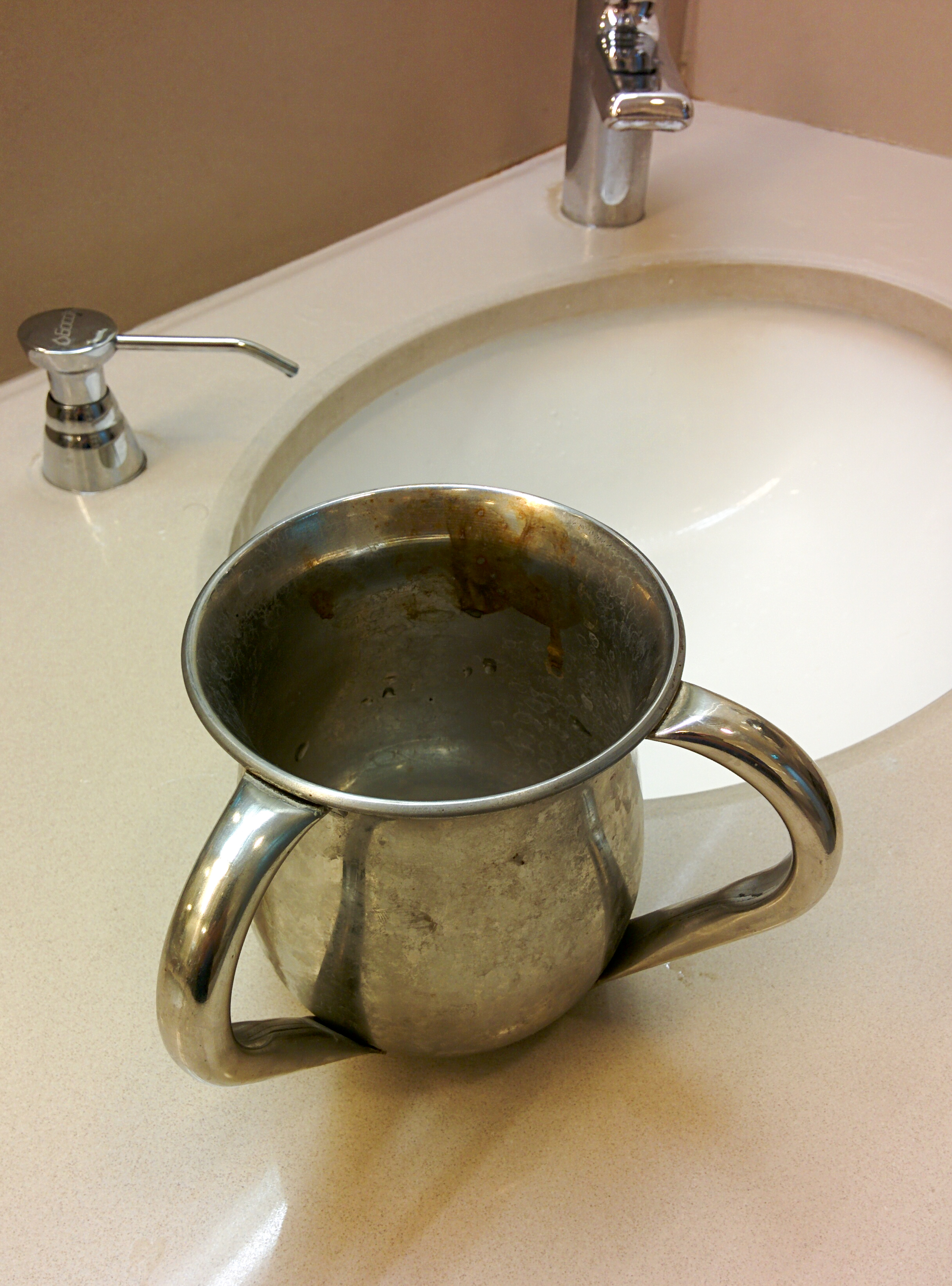
Cup used for ritual Jewish handwashing

The Hebrew Bible mentions a number of situations when ritual purification is required, including following menstruation (niddah), childbirth, sexual relations, nocturnal emission, unusual bodily fluids, skin disease, death (corpse uncleanness), and certain animal sacrifices. Generally, the ritual in these circumstances consists of immersing the whole body in a special bath (a mikveh). In addition, the oral law specifies other situations when ritual purification is required, such as after performing excretory functions, meals, and waking. In these circumstances, typically, only the hands are washed.

These regulations were variously observed by the Israelites. Purification was required so ritually impure individuals would not defile the Tabernacle and receive the kareth or execution. Nowadays, in the absence of the Temple in Jerusalem, many of the Torah's laws about purification have no practical implication and are no longer observed. However, purification from the niddah status is still observed by contemporary Orthodox Jews and (with some modifications and additional leniencies) some Conservative Jews, as its practical implications are highly relevant: a woman who is impure with this status is forbidden to have sexual contact with her husband.

Corpse uncleanness, or coming into contact with a corpse, is considered the ultimate impurity. It cannot be purified through immersion in a mikveh alone, but also requires sprinkling with the ashes of the red heifer. Since the red heifer no longer exists, this form of impurity cannot be removed, so all individuals are assumed to possess the impurity of death. This has a few practical implications: it prohibits Jews from entering the site of the Temple in Jerusalem and prohibits eating certain foods (such as terumah) which may only be eaten when pure.

== Mandaeism ==
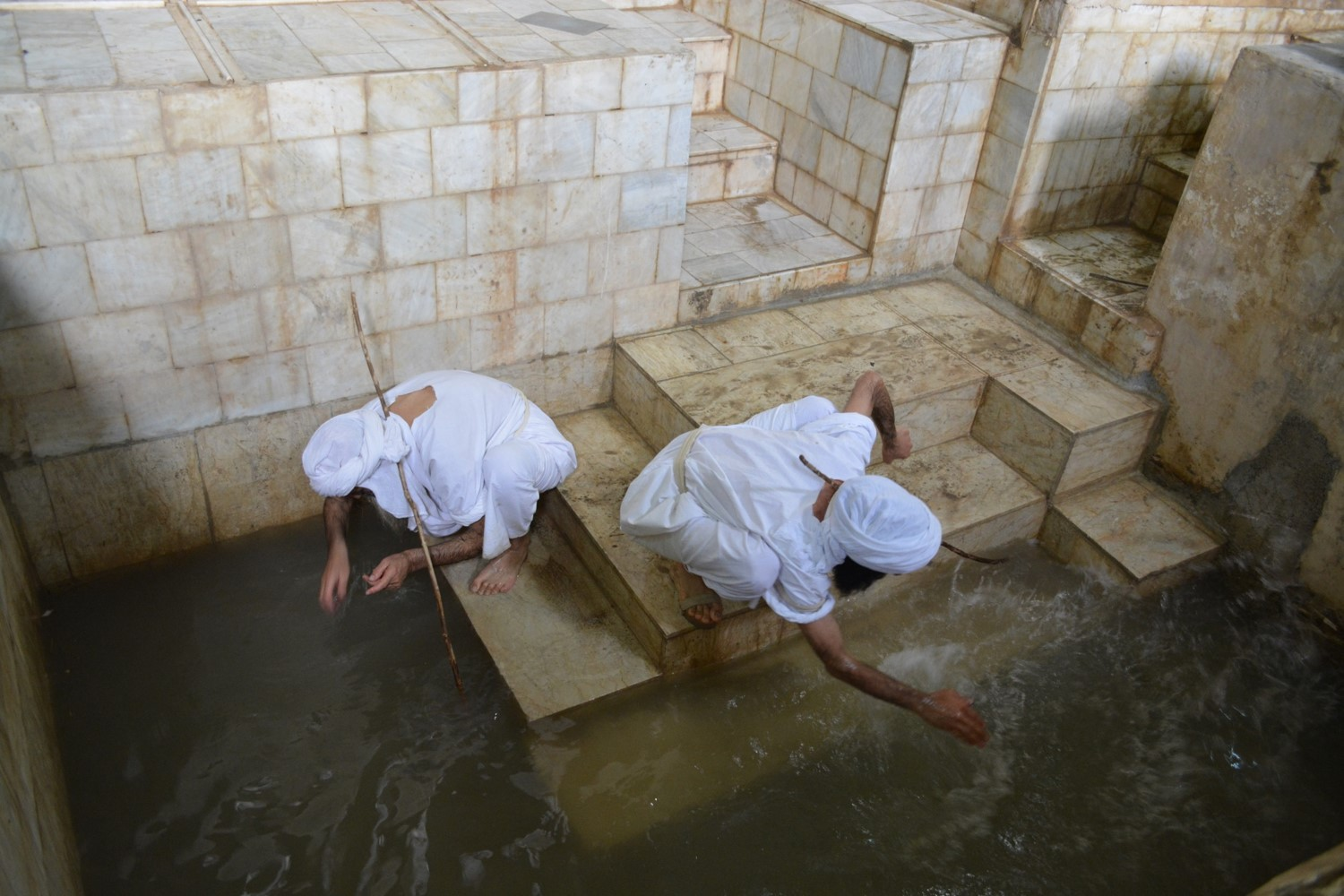
Mandaean priests performing tamasha in preparation for the masbuta during the 2015 Parwanaya festival in Ahvaz, Iran

One of the most important ceremonies in Mandaean worship is baptism (masbuta). Unlike Christianity, baptism is not a one-off event but is performed every Sunday, the Mandaean holy day, as a purification ritual. Baptism usually involves full immersion in flowing water, and all rivers considered fit for baptism are called yardna for the Jordan River. After emerging from the water, the worshipper is anointed with holy sesame oil (misha) and partakes in a communion of sacramental bread (pihta) and water. Other rituals for purification include the rishama and the tamasha which, unlike masbuta, can be performed without a priest. The rishama (signing) is performed before prayers and involves washing the face and limbs while reciting specific prayers. It is performed daily, before sunrise, with hair covered and after evacuation of bowels or before religious ceremonies (see wudu). The tamasha is a triple immersion in the river without a priest being required to do it. Women perform it after menstruation or childbirth, men and women after sexual activity or nocturnal emission, touching a corpse or any other type of defilement (see tevilah). Ritual purification also applies to fruits, vegetables, pots, pans, utensils, animals for consumption and ceremonial garments (rasta). Purification for a dying person is also performed. It includes bathing, which involves a threefold sprinkling of river water over the person from head to feet.

== Shinto ==
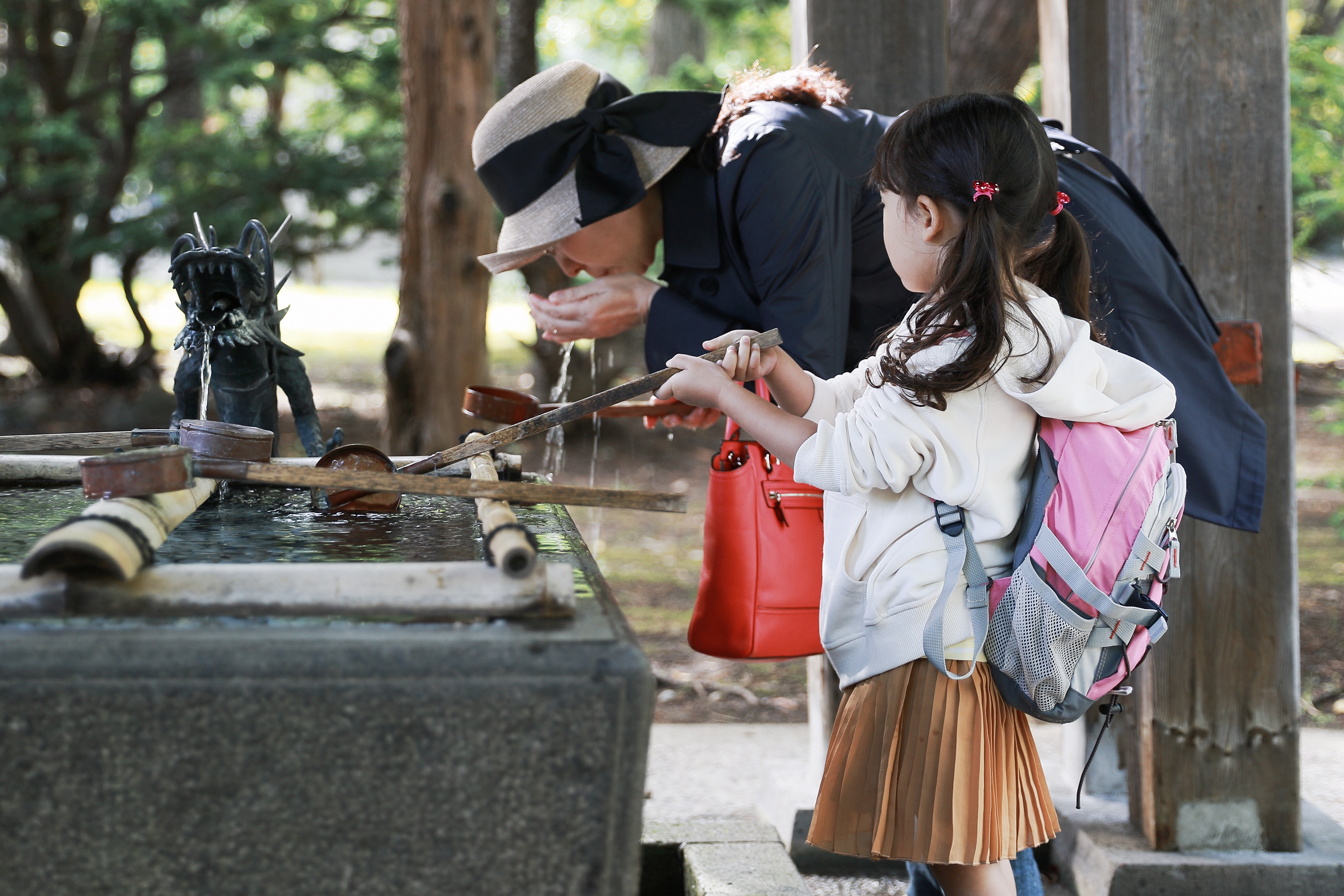
A mother and daughter purify themselves before entering a Shinto shrine.

Ritual cleanliness is a central part of Shinto life. In Shinto, a common form of ritual purification is misogi, which involves natural running water, and especially waterfalls. Rather than being entirely naked, men usually wear Japanese loincloths and women wear kimono, both additionally wearing headbands.

== Western esotericism ==
In ceremonial magic, 'banishing' refers to one or more rituals intended to remove non-physical influences ranging from spirits to negative influences. Although banishing rituals are often used as components of more complex ceremonies, they can also be performed by themselves. Banishing can be viewed as one of several techniques of magic, closely related to ritual purification and a typical prerequisite for consecration and invocation.

In the Hermetic Order of the Golden Dawn, the Lesser Ritual of the Pentagram (banishing: LBRP; invoking: LIRP) must be learned by the Neophyte before moving on to the next grade (Zelator). For actual workings Aleister Crowley recommends a short, general banishing, with a comment that "in more elaborate ceremonies it is usual to banish everything by name." In Liber Aleph vel CXI, Crowley recommended that a banishing ritual be done at least once daily by Thelemites.

In Wicca and various forms of neopaganism, banishing is performed before casting a circle in order to purify the area where the ritual or magick is about to take place. In his books on nocturnal witchcraft, for example, Konstantinos recommends performing banishings regularly, in order to keep the magical workspace free of negativity, and to become proficient in banishing before attempting acts that are much more spiritually taxing on the body, such as magical spellworking.

== See also ==
- Hagneia
- Bathing the dead
- Churching of women
- Eleusinian Mysteries
- Lady Macbeth effect
- Law of contagion
- Lustral basin
- Water and religion
