= Banishing =

Type of ritual in ceremonial magic

In ceremonial magic, banishing refers to one or more rituals intended to remove non-physical influences ranging from spirits to negative influences. Although banishing rituals are often used as components of more complex ceremonies, they can also be performed by themselves. Banishing can be viewed as one of several techniques of magic, closely related to ritual purification and a typical prerequisite for consecration and invocation.

In the Hermetic Order of the Golden Dawn, the Lesser Banishing Ritual of the Pentagram (LBRP) must be learned by the Neophyte before moving on to the next grade (Zelator).

For actual workings, Aleister Crowley recommends a short, general banishing, with a comment that "in more elaborate ceremonies it is usual to banish everything by name." Crowley also recommended that a banishing ritual be done at least once daily by Thelemites in Liber Aleph vel CXI.

== Wicca ==
In Wicca and various forms of neopaganism, banishing is performed before casting a magic circle in order to purify the area where the ritual or magic is about to take place. In his book Nocturnal Witchcraft, for example, Konstantinos recommends performing banishings regularly, in order to keep the magical workspace free of negativity, and to become proficient in banishing before attempting acts that are much more spiritually taxing on the body, such as magical spellworking.

== Rituals ==
- The Lesser Ritual of the Pentagram
- Greater Banishing Ritual of the Pentagram
- Lesser Banishing Ritual of the Hexagram
- Greater Banishing Ritual of the Hexagram
- The Star Ruby, a version of the Lesser Banishing Ritual of the Pentagram that was modified by Aleister Crowley for the use of adherents to Thelema.

== See also ==
- Exorcism
