= Tau robe =

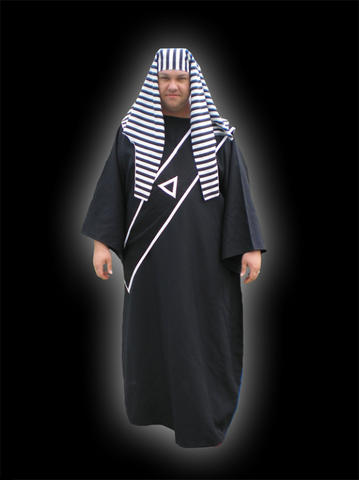
Example of a tau robe with traditional Hermetic Order of the Golden Dawn style grade sash and "nemyss" (Egyptian nemes).

A tau robe is a very simple black or white gown cut to resemble the Greek letter, "tau," or "T".

== Description ==
The arms are usually from fingertip to fingertip, and the bottom hem is usually floor length, as with a ceremonial tabard. Both the arms and body of the gown will flare so that the sleeves being bell sleeves, are wider at the fingers than at the shoulder, and the bottom wider than at the chest. This loose fitting helps with maneuverability while wearing the robe.

== Purpose ==
The robe is one of the vestments worn in ceremonial magic. Although not essential, Donald Michael Kraig describes the purpose of wearing the robe as "to physically show both your conscious and your unconscious that you are no longer in your daily dress." Kraig goes on to say wearing the robe indicates a magical and spiritual intent, such as engaging in ritual, and should be kept exclusively for that purpose.
