= Ceremonial magic =

Variety of rituals of magic

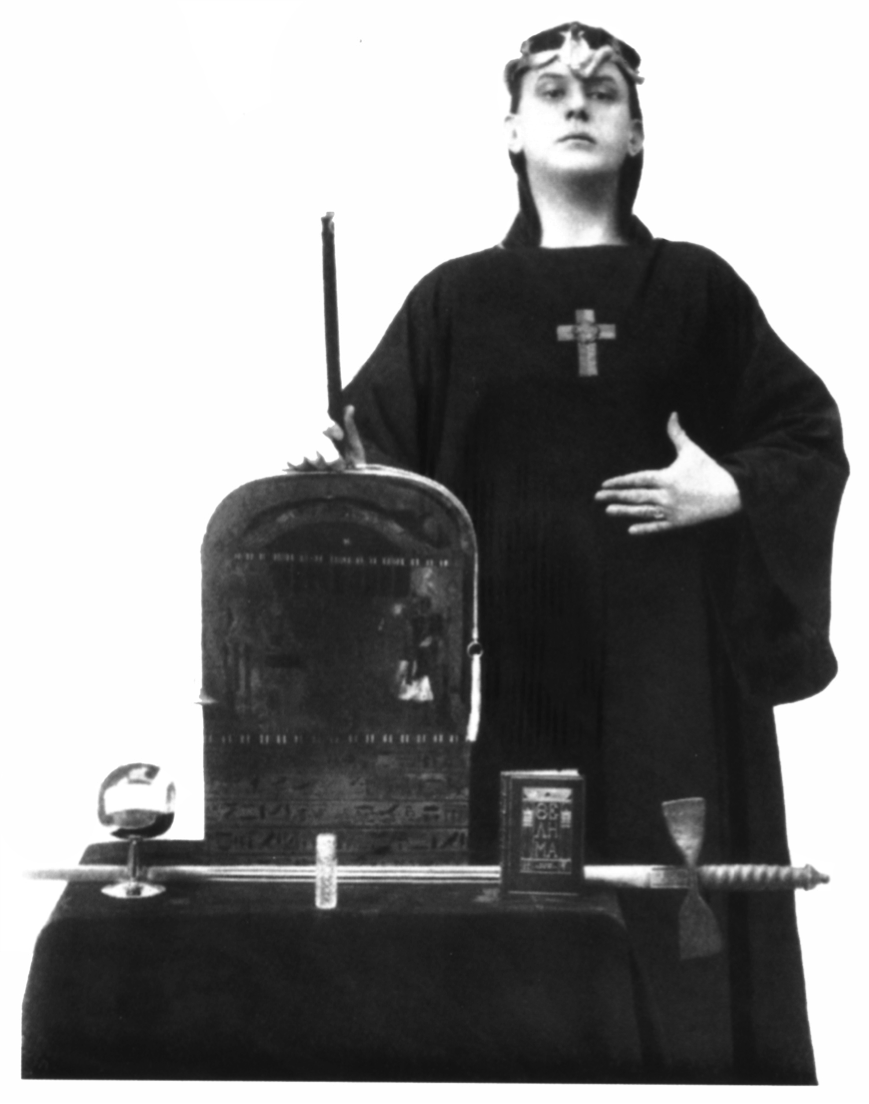
Ceremonial magician Aleister Crowley dressed in ritual garb, c. 1912. Published as the frontispiece for the second part of his treatise Magick (Book 4).

Ceremonial magic (also known as magick, ritual magic, high magic or learned magic) encompasses a wide variety of rituals of magic. The works included are characterized by ceremony and numerous requisite accessories to aid the practitioner. It can be seen as an extension of ritual magic, and in most cases synonymous with it. Popularized by the Hermetic Order of the Golden Dawn, it draws on such schools of philosophical and occult thought as Hermetic Qabalah, Enochian magic, Thelema, and the magic of various grimoires. Ceremonial magic is part of Hermeticism and Western esotericism.

The synonym magick is an archaic spelling of 'magic' used during the Renaissance, which was revived by Aleister Crowley to differentiate occult magic from stage magic. He defined it as "the Science and Art of causing Change to occur in conformity with Will", including ordinary acts of will as well as ritual magic. Crowley wrote that "it is theoretically possible to cause in any object any change of which that object is capable by nature". (Note: Crowley (1997), p. 127: "What is a Magical Operation? It may be defined as any event in nature which is brought to pass by will. We must not exclude potato-growing or banking from our definition. Let us take a very simple example of a Magical Act: that of a man blowing his nose.") John Symonds and Kenneth Grant attach a deeper occult significance to this preference. (Note: Symonds & Grant (1973), p.: "The Anglo-Saxon k in Magick, like most of Crowley's conceits, is a means of indicating the kind of magic which he performed. K is the eleventh letter of several alphabets, and eleven is the principal number of magick, because it is the number attributed to the Qliphoth – the underworld of demonic and chaotic forces that have to be conquered before magick can be performed. K has other magical implications: it corresponds to the power or shakti aspect of creative energy, for k is the ancient Egyptian khu, the magical power. Specifically, it stands for kteis (vagina), the complement to the wand (or phallus) which is used by the Magician in certain aspects of the Great Work.")

Crowley saw magic as the essential method for a person to reach true understanding of the self and to act according to one's true will, which he saw as the reconciliation "between freewill and destiny." Crowley describes this process in his Magick, Book 4. (Note: Crowley (1997), p. 134: "One must find out for oneself, and make sure beyond doubt, who one is, what one is, why one is ...Being thus conscious of the proper course to pursue, the next thing is to understand the conditions necessary to following it out. After that, one must eliminate from oneself every element alien or hostile to success, and develop those parts of oneself which are specially needed to control the aforesaid conditions.")

== Definitions and general purpose ==
The term magick is an Early Modern English spelling for magic, used in works such as the 1651 translation of Heinrich Cornelius Agrippa's De Occulta Philosophia, Three Books of Occult Philosophy, or Of Magick. Aleister Crowley chose the spelling to differentiate his practices and rituals from illusion, and the term has since been re-popularised by those who have adopted elements of his teachings. Crowley defined Magick as "the science and art of causing change to occur in conformity with will."

=== Qabalah and the Tree of Life ===
The Tree of Life is a tool used to categorize and organize various mystical concepts. At its most simple level, it is composed of ten spheres, or emanations, called sephiroth (sing. "sephira") which are connected by twenty-two paths. The sephiroth are represented by the planets and the paths by the characters of the Hebrew alphabet, which are subdivided by the four classical elements, the seven classical planets, and the twelve signs of the Zodiac. Within the western magical tradition, the Tree is used as a kind of conceptual filing cabinet. Each sephira and path is assigned various ideas, such as gods, cards of the Tarot, astrological planets and signs, elements, etc.

Crowley considered a deep understanding of the Tree of Life to be essential to the magician:

The Tree of Life has got to be learnt by heart; you must know it backwards, forwards, sideways, and upside down; it must become the automatic background of all your thinking. You must keep on hanging everything that comes your way upon its proper bough.

Similar to yoga, learning the Tree of Life is not so much magic as it is a way to map out one's spiritual universe. As such, the adept may use the Tree to determine a destination for astral travel, to choose which gods to invoke for what purposes, et cetera. It also plays an important role in modeling the spiritual journey, where the adept begins in Malkuth, which is the every-day material world of phenomena, with the ultimate goal being at Kether, the sphere of Unity with the All.

== Components ==
=== Body of light ===
The body of light, sometimes called the 'astral body' (Note: n.b. however, this term may refer instead to the Theosophical concept of the astral body.) or the 'subtle body,' (Note: n.b. however, this term may refer instead to the subtle body of Eastern esotericism.) is a "quasi material" aspect of the human body, being neither solely physical nor solely spiritual, posited by a number of philosophers, and elaborated on according to various esoteric, occult, and mystical teachings. Other terms used for this body include body of glory, spirit-body, radiant body, luciform body, augoeides ('radiant'), astroeides ('starry' or 'sidereal body'), and celestial body.

Crowley referred to the augoeides, a Greek term for the body of light, and connected it with 'the Knowledge & Conversation of the Holy Guardian Angel' associated with each human being. He stressed that the body of light must be built up through the use of imagination, and that it must then be animated, exercised, and disciplined. According to Asprem (2017):

The practice of creating a "body of light” in imagination builds on the body-image system, potentially working with alterations across all of its three modalities (perceptual, conceptual, and affective): an idealized body is produced (body-image model), new conceptual structures are attached to it (e.g., the doctrine of multiple, separable bodies), while emotional attachments of awe, dignity, and fear responses are cultivated through the performance of astral rituals and protections from "astral dangers" through the simulation of symbols and magical weapons.

=== Grimoires ===
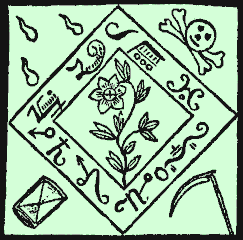
This design for an amulet comes from the Black Pullet grimoire.

A grimoire is a textbook of magic, typically including instructions on how to create magical objects like talismans and amulets, how to perform magical spells, charms and divination, and how to summon or invoke supernatural entities such as angels, spirits, deities, and demons. In many cases, the books themselves are believed to be imbued with magical powers, although in many cultures, other sacred texts that are not grimoires (such as the Bible) have been believed to have supernatural properties intrinsically. The only contents found in a grimoire would be information on spells, rituals, the preparation of magical tools, and lists of ingredients and their magical correspondences. In this manner, while all books on magic could be thought of as grimoires, not all magical books should be thought of as grimoires.

While the term grimoire is originally European—and many Europeans throughout history, particularly ceremonial magicians and cunning folk, have used grimoires—the historian Owen Davies noted that similar books can be found all around the world, ranging from Jamaica to Sumatra. He also noted that in this sense, the world's first grimoires were created in Europe and the Ancient Near East.

=== Magical formulae ===
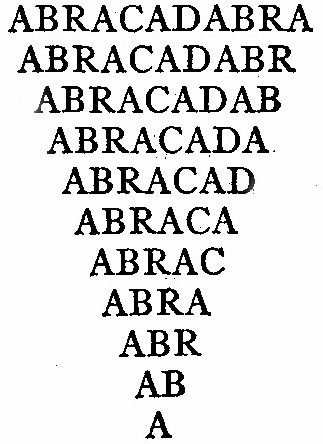
Classic magic words

A magical formula or 'word of power' is a word that is believed to have specific supernatural effects. They are words whose meaning illustrates principles and degrees of understanding that are often difficult to relay using other forms of speech or writing. It is a concise means to communicate very abstract information through the medium of a word or phrase.

These words often have no intrinsic meaning in and of themselves. However, when deconstructed, each individual letter may refer to some universal concept found in the system in which the formula appears. Additionally, by grouping certain letters, one can display meaningful sequences that are considered valuable to the spiritual system that utilizes them (e.g., spiritual hierarchies, historiographic data, psychological stages, etc.).

A formula's potency is understood and made usable by the magician only through prolonged meditation on its levels of meaning. Once these have been internalized by the magician, they may then utilize the formula to maximum effect.

=== Magical record ===
A magical record is a journal or other source of documentation containing magical events, experiences, ideas, and any other information that the magician may see fit to add. There can be many purposes for such a record, such as recording evidence to verify the effectiveness of specific procedures (per the scientific method that Aleister Crowley claimed should be applied to the practice of magic) or to ensure that data may propagate beyond the lifetime of the magician. The benefits of this process vary, but usually include future analysis and further education by the individual and/or associates with whom the magician feels comfortable in revealing such intrinsically private information.

Crowley was highly insistent upon the importance of this practice. As he writes in Liber E, "It is absolutely necessary that all experiments should be recorded in detail during, or immediately after, their performance ... The more scientific the record is, the better. Yet the emotions should be noted, as being some of the conditions. Let then the record be written with sincerity and care; thus with practice it will be found more and more to approximate to the ideal." Other items he suggests for inclusion include the physical and mental condition of the experimenter, the time and place, and environmental conditions, including the weather.

=== Magical weapons ===
The practice of ceremonial magic often requires tools made or consecrated specifically for this use, called magical weapons, which are required for a particular ritual or series of rituals. They may be a symbolic representation of psychological elements of the magician or of metaphysical concepts.

In Magick (Book 4), Part II (Magick), Aleister Crowley lists the tools required as a magic circle drawn on the ground and inscribed with the names of god, an altar, a wand, cup, sword, and pentacle, to represent his true will, his understanding, his reason, and the lower parts of his being respectively. On the altar, too, is a phial of oil to represent his aspiration, and for consecrating items to his intent. The magician is surrounded by a scourge, dagger, and chain intended to keep his intent pure. An oil lamp, book of conjurations, and bell are required, as is the wearing of a crown, robe, and lamen. The crown affirms his divinity, the robe symbolizes silence, and the lamen declares his work. The book of conjurations is his magical record, his karma. In the East is the magic fire in which all burns up at last.

== Techniques ==
According to Crowley, there is a single definition of the purpose for ritual magic: to achieve Union with God through "the uniting of the Microcosm with the Macrocosm." Since this process is so arduous, it is also acceptable to use magic to develop the self (i.e. one's body of light) or to create ideal circumstances for the Work (e.g. having access to a place in which to do ritual undisturbed). There are many kinds of magic, but the categories of ritual that are recommended by Crowley include:

- Banishing—the elimination of unwanted forces. "The Magician must therefore take the utmost care in the matter of purification, firstly, of himself, secondly, of his instruments, thirdly, of the place of working."
- Invocation, where the magician identifies with the Deity invoked. There are three methods:
  1. Devotion —where "identity with the God is attained by love and by surrender, by giving up or suppressing all irrelevant (and illusionary) parts of yourself."
  2. Calling forth—where "identity is attained by paying special attention to the desired part of yourself: positive, as the first method is negative." (e.g. assumption of godforms)
  3. Drama—where "identity is attained by sympathy. It is very difficult for the ordinary man to lose himself completely in the subject of a play or of a novel; but for those who can do so, this method is unquestionably the best." (e.g. many initiations and the Gnostic Mass)
- Evocation—which is bringing a spiritual being before, not into, the magician (e.g. goetia)
- Eucharistic ritual—which "consists in taking common things, transmuting them into things divine, and consuming them."
- Consecration—"the active dedication of a thing to a single purpose."
- Divination—such as the use of the Thoth Tarot or other tools used to gather information.

=== Vibration of god-names ===
In magical rituals, a vocal technique called vibration is commonly used. This was a basic aspect of magical training for Crowley, who described it in "Liber O." According to that text, vibration involves a physical set of steps, starting in a standing position, breathing in through the nose while imagining the name of the god entering with the breath, imagining that breath travelling through the entire body, stepping forward with the left foot while throwing the body forward with arms outstretched, visualizing the name rushing out when spoken, ending in an upright stance, with the right forefinger placed upon the lips. According to Crowley in "Liber O", success in this technique is signaled by physical exhaustion and "though only by the student himself is it perceived, when he hears the name of the God vehemently roared forth, as if by the concourse of ten thousand thunders; and it should appear to him as if that Great Voice proceeded from the Universe, and not from himself."

=== Banishing ===
The purpose of banishing rituals is to eliminate forces that might interfere with a magical operation, and they are often performed at the beginning of an important event or ceremony (although they can be performed for their own sake as well). The area of effect can be a magic circle or a room. The general theory of magic proposes that there are various forces which are represented by the classical elements (air, earth, fire, and water), the planets, the signs of the Zodiac, and adjacent spaces in the astral world. There are many banishing rituals, but most are some variation on two of the most common—"The Star Ruby" and the Lesser Banishing Ritual of the Pentagram.

Crowley describes banishing in his Magick, Book 4 (ch.13):

[...] in the banishing ritual of the pentagram we not only command the demons to depart, but invoke the Archangels and their hosts to act as guardians of the Circle during our pre-occupation with the ceremony proper. In more elaborate ceremonies it is usual to banish everything by name. Each element, each planet, and each sign, perhaps even the Sephiroth themselves; all are removed, including the very one which we wished to invoke, for that forces as existing in Nature is always impure. But this process, being long and wearisome, is not altogether advisable in actual working. It is usually sufficient to perform a general banishing, and to rely upon the aid of the guardians invoked. [...] "The Banishing Ritual of the Pentagram" is the best to use.

He further states:

Those who regard this ritual as a mere devise to invoke or banish spirits, are unworthy to possess it. Properly understood, it is the Medicine of Metals and the Stone of the Wise.

=== Purification ===
Purification is similar in theme to banishing, but is a more rigorous process of preparing the self and her temple for serious spiritual work. Crowley mentions that ancient magicians would purify themselves through arduous programs, such as through special diets, fasting, sexual abstinence, keeping the body meticulously tidy, and undergoing a complicated series of prayers. He goes on to say that purification no longer requires such activity, since the magician can purify the self via willed intention. Specifically, the magician labors to purify the mind and body of all influences which may interfere with the Great Work:

The point is to seize every occasion of bringing every available force to bear upon the objective of the assault. It does not matter what the force is (by any standard of judgment) so long as it plays its proper part in securing the success of the general purpose [...] We must constantly examine ourselves, and assure ourselves that every action is really subservient to the One Purpose

Crowley recommended symbolically ritual practices, such as bathing and robing before a main ceremony: "The bath signifies the removal of all things extraneous or antagonistic to the one thought. The putting on of the robe is the positive side of the same operation. It is the assumption of the frame of mind suitable to that one thought."

=== Consecration ===
Consecration is an equally important magical operation. It is essentially the dedication, usually of a ritual instrument or space, to a specific purpose. In Magick, Book 4 (ch.13), Crowley writes:

The ritual here in question should summarize the situation, and devote the particular arrangement to its purpose by invoking the appropriate forces. Let it be well remembered that each object is bound by the Oaths of its original consecration as such. Thus, if a pantacle has been made sacred to Venus, it cannot be used in an operation of Mars.

=== Invocation ===
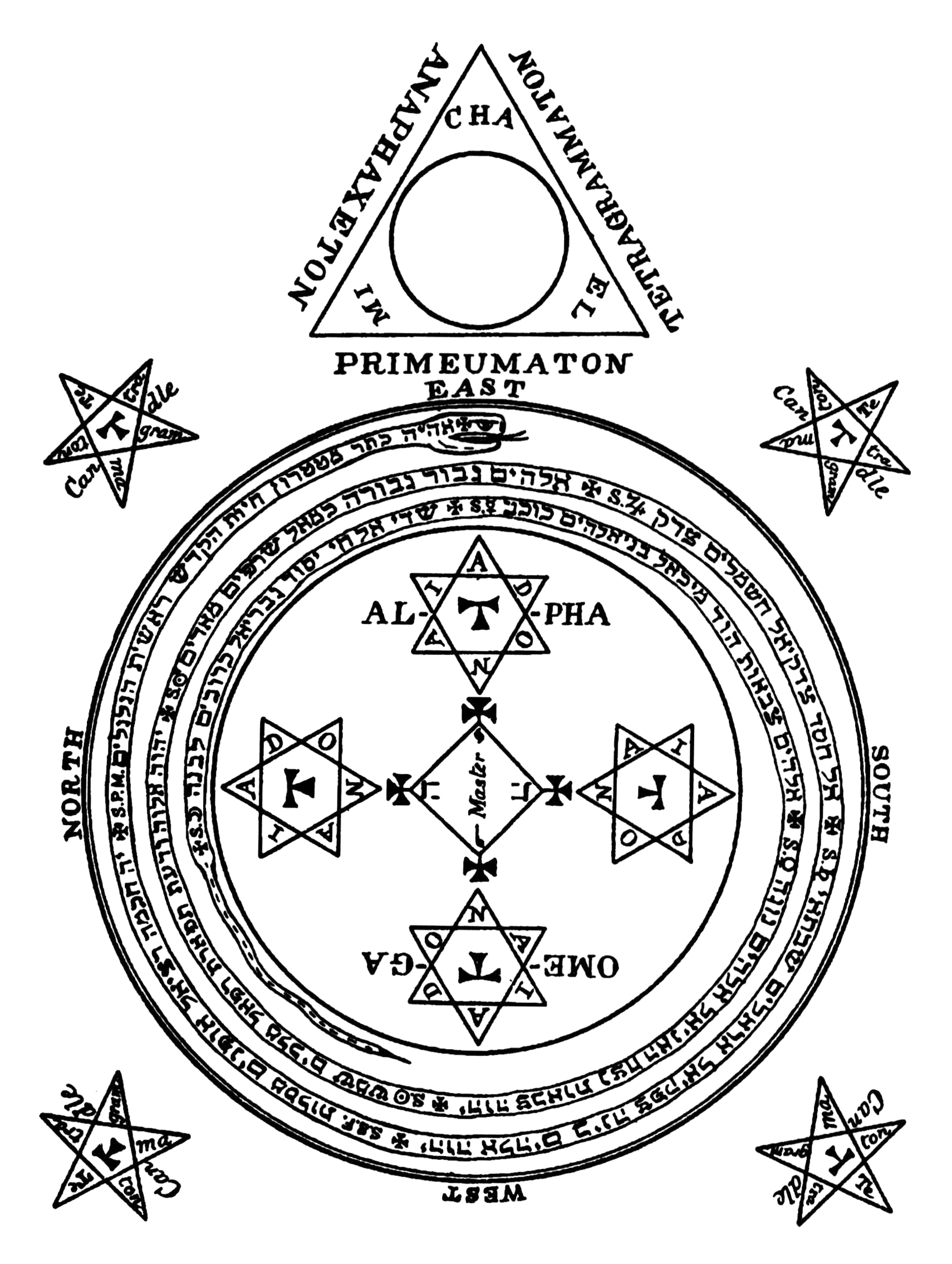
An example of the magic circle and triangle of King Solomon

Invocation is the bringing in or identifying with a particular deity or spirit. Crowley wrote of two keys to success in this arena: to "inflame thyself in praying" and to "invoke often". For Crowley, the single most important invocation, or any act of magic for that matter, was the invocation of one's Holy Guardian Angel, or "secret self", which allows the adept to know his or her true will.

Crowley describes the experience of invocation:

The mind must be exalted until it loses consciousness of self. The Magician must be carried forward blindly by a force which, though in him and of him, is by no means that which he in his normal state of consciousness calls I. Just as the poet, the lover, the artist, is carried out of himself in a creative frenzy, so must it be for the Magician.

Crowley (Magick, Book 4) discusses three main categories of invocation, although "in the great essentials these three methods are one. In each case the magician identifies himself with the Deity invoked."

- Devotion—where "identity with the God is attained by love and by surrender, by giving up or suppressing all irrelevant (and illusionary) parts of yourself."
- Calling forth—where "identity is attained by paying special attention to the desired part of yourself."
- Drama—where "identity is attained by sympathy. It is very difficult for the ordinary man to lose himself completely in the subject of a play or of a novel; but for those who can do so, this method is unquestionably the best."

Another invocatory technique that the magician can employ is called the assumption of godforms — where with "concentrated imagination of oneself in the symbolic shape of any God, one should be able to identify oneself with the idea which [the god] represents." A general method involves positioning the body in a position that is typical for a given god, imagining that the image of the god is coinciding with or enveloping the body, accompanied by the practice of "vibration" of the appropriate god-name(s).

=== Evocation ===
There is a distinct difference between invocation and evocation, as Crowley explains:

To "invoke" is to "call in", just as to "evoke" is to "call forth". This is the essential difference between the two branches of Magick. In invocation, the macrocosm floods the consciousness. In evocation, the magician, having become the macrocosm, creates a microcosm. You invoke a God into the Circle. You evoke a Spirit into the Triangle.

Generally, evocation is used for two main purposes: to gather information and to obtain the services or obedience of a spirit or demon. Crowley believed that the most effective form of evocation was found in the grimoire on Goetia (see below), which instructs the magician in how to safely summon forth and command 72 infernal spirits. However, it is equally possible to evoke angelic beings, gods, and other intelligences related to planets, elements, and the Zodiac.

Unlike with invocation, which involves a calling in, evocation involves a calling forth, most commonly into what is called the "triangle of art."

=== Eucharist ===
The word eucharist originally comes from the Greek word for thanksgiving. However, within magic, it takes on a special meaning—the transmutation of ordinary things (usually food and drink) into divine sacraments, which are then consumed. The object is to infuse the food and drink with certain properties, usually embodied by various deities, so that the adept takes in those properties upon consumption. Crowley describes the process of the regular practice of eucharistic ritual:

The magician becomes filled with God, fed upon God, intoxicated with God. Little by little his body will become purified by the internal lustration of God; day by day his mortal frame, shedding its earthly elements, will become in very truth the Temple of the Holy Ghost. Day by day matter is replaced by Spirit, the human by the divine; ultimately the change will be complete; God manifest in flesh will be his name.

There are several eucharistic rituals within the magical canon. Two of the most well known are the Mass of the Phoenix and the Gnostic Mass. The first is a ritual designed for the individual, which involves sacrificing a "Cake of Light" (a type of bread that serves as the host) to Ra (i.e. the Sun) and infusing a second Cake with the adept's own blood (either real or symbolic, in a gesture reflecting the myth of the Pelican cutting its own breast to feed its young) and then consuming it with the words, "There is no grace: there is no guilt: This is the Law: Do what thou wilt!" The other ritual, The Gnostic Mass, is a very popular public ritual (although it can be practiced privately) that involves a team of participants, including a Priest and Priestess. This ritual is an enactment of the mystical journey that culminates with the Mystic Marriage and the consumption of a Cake of Light and a goblet of wine (a process termed "communication"). Afterwards, each Communicant declares, "There is no part of me that is not of the gods!"

=== Divination ===
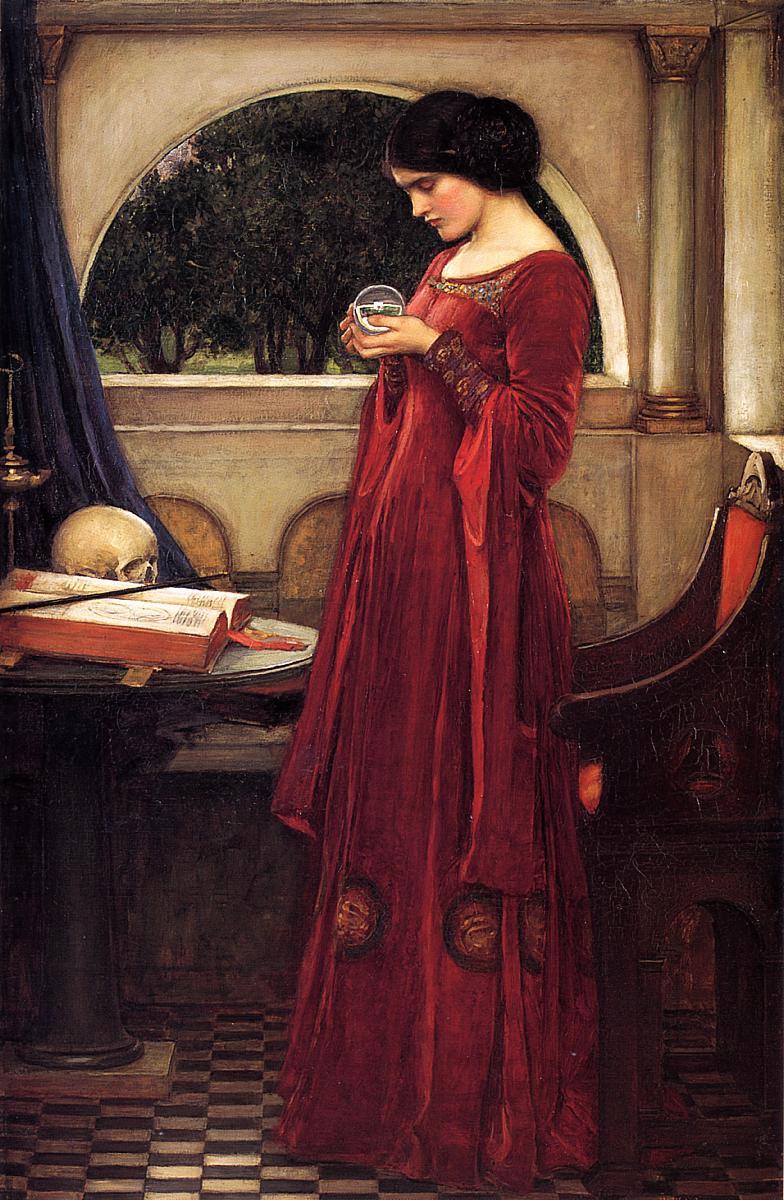
The Crystal Ball, by John William Waterhouse (1902), depicts a crystal ball, a skull, a wand, and a book of ceremonial magic.

The art of divination is generally employed for the purpose of obtaining information that can guide the adept in his Great Work. The underlying theory states that there exists intelligences (either outside of or inside the mind of the diviner) that can offer accurate information within certain limits using a language of symbols. Normally, divination within magic is not the same as fortune telling, which is more interested in predicting future events. Rather, divination tends to be more about discovering information about the nature and condition of things that can help the magician gain insight and to make better decisions.

There are hundreds of different divinatory techniques in the world. However, Western occult practice mostly includes the use of astrology (calculating the influence of heavenly bodies), bibliomancy (reading random passages from a book, such as Liber Legis or the I Ching), Thoth Tarot (a deck of 78 cards, each with symbolic meaning, usually laid out in a meaningful pattern), and geomancy (a method of making random marks on paper or in earth that results in a combination of sixteen patterns).

It is an accepted truism within magic that divination is imperfect. As Crowley writes, "In estimating the ultimate value of a divinatory judgment, one must allow for more than the numerous sources of error inherent in the process itself. The judgment can do no more than the facts presented to it warrant. It is naturally impossible in most cases to make sure that some important factor has not been omitted [...] One must not assume that the oracle is omniscient."

== History ==
=== Renaissance magic ===
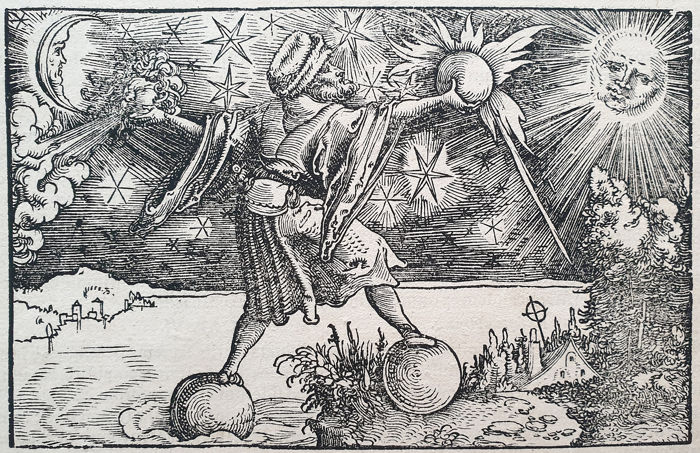
Woodcut illustration from an edition of Pliny the Elder's Naturalis Historia (1582)

The term originates in 16th-century Renaissance magic, referring to practices described in various Medieval and Renaissance grimoires and in collections such as that of Johannes Hartlieb. Georg Pictor uses the term synonymously with goetia.

James Sanford in his 1569 translation of Heinrich Cornelius Agrippa's 1526 De incertitudine et vanitate scientiarum has "The partes of ceremoniall Magicke be Geocie, and Theurgie". For Agrippa, ceremonial magic was in opposition to natural magic. While he had his misgivings about natural magic, which included astrology, alchemy, and also what we would today consider fields of natural science, such as botany, he was nevertheless prepared to accept it as "the highest peak of natural philosophy". Ceremonial magic, on the other hand, which included all sorts of communication with spirits, including necromancy and witchcraft, he denounced in its entirety as impious disobedience towards God.

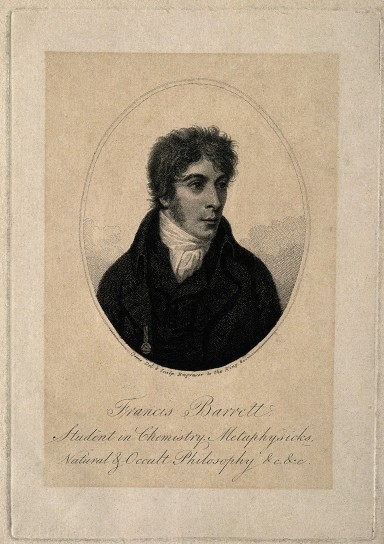
Portrait of Francis Barrett, author of the book The Magus (1801)

=== Francis Barrett ===
Among the various sources for ceremonial magic, Francis Barrett, a late 18th-century Englishman, called himself a student of chemistry, metaphysics, and natural occult philosophy. Barrett was enthusiastic about reviving interest in the occult arts, and published a magical textbook called The Magus. The Magus dealt with the natural magic of herbs and stones, magnetism, talismanic magic, alchemy, numerology, the elements, and biographies of famous adepts from history. It was a compilation, almost entirely consisting of selections from Cornelius Agrippa's Three Books of Occult Philosophy, the Fourth Book of Occult Philosophy attributed to Agrippa, and Robert Turner's 1655 translation of the Heptameron of Peter of Abano. Barrett made modifications and modernized spelling and syntax. Possibly influencing the novelist Edward Bulwer-Lytton, the book gained little other notice until it influenced Eliphas Levi.

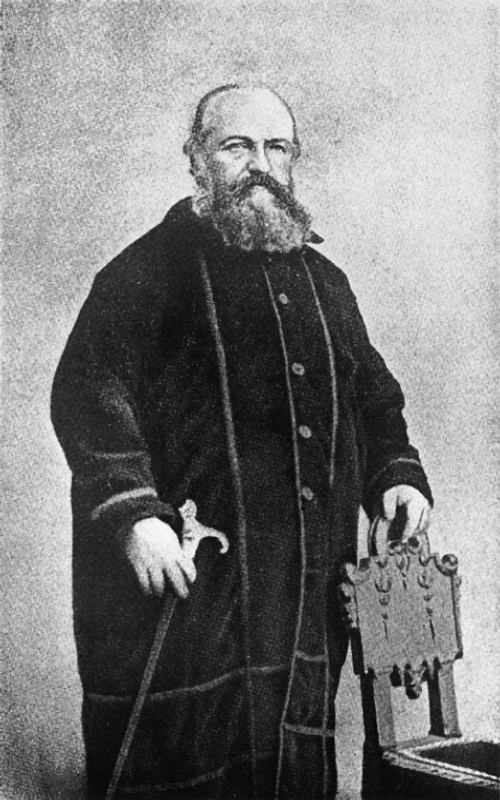
Éliphas Lévi

=== Éliphas Lévi ===
Éliphas Lévi (1810–1875) conceived the notion of writing a treatise on magic with his friend Bulwer-Lytton. This appeared in 1855 under the title Dogme et Rituel de la Haute Magie, and was translated into English by Arthur Edward Waite as Transcendental Magic, its Doctrine and Ritual.

In 1861, he published a sequel, La Clef des Grands Mystères (The Key to the Great Mysteries). Further magical works by Lévi include Fables et Symboles (Stories and Images), 1862, and La Science des Esprits (The Science of Spirits), 1865. In 1868, he wrote Le Grand Arcane, ou l'Occultisme Dévoilé (The Great Secret, or Occultism Unveiled); this, however, was only published posthumously in 1898.

Lévi's version of magic became a great success, especially after his death. That Spiritualism was popular on both sides of the Atlantic from the 1850s contributed to his success. His magical teachings were free from obvious fanaticisms, even if they remained rather murky; he had nothing to sell, and did not pretend to be the initiate of some ancient or fictitious secret society. He incorporated the Tarot cards into his magical system, and as a result the Tarot has been an important part of the paraphernalia of Western magicians. He had a deep impact on the magic of the Hermetic Order of the Golden Dawn and later Aleister Crowley, and it was largely through this impact that Lévi is remembered as one of the key founders of the twentieth century revival of magic.

=== Hermetic Order of the Golden Dawn ===
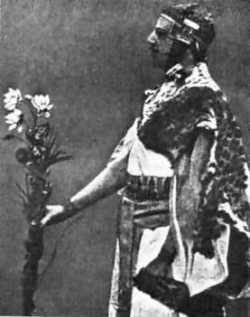
Samuel Liddell MacGregor Mathers (1854–1918), in Egyptian costume, performs a ritual of Isis in the rites of the Golden Dawn.

The Hermetic Order of the Golden Dawn (founded 1888) was a secret society devoted to the study and practice of the occult, metaphysics, and paranormal activities during the late 19th and early 20th centuries. Known as a magical order, the Hermetic Order of the Golden Dawn was active in Great Britain and focused its practices on theurgy and spiritual development. Many present-day concepts of ritual and magic that are at the centre of contemporary traditions, such as Wicca and Thelema, were inspired by the Golden Dawn, which became one of the largest single influences on 20th century Western occultism. (Note: Jenkins (2000), p. 74: "Also in the 1880s, the tradition of ritual magic was revived in London by a group of Masonic adepts, who formed the Order of the Golden Dawn, which would prove an incalculable influence on the whole subsequent history of occultism.") (Note: Smoley (1999), pp. 102–103: "Founded in 1888, the Golden Dawn lasted a mere twelve years before it was shattered by personal conflicts. At its height, it probably had no more than a hundred members. Yet its influence on magic and esoteric thought in the English-speaking world would be hard to overestimate.")

The three founders, William Robert Woodman, William Wynn Westcott, and Samuel Liddell Mathers, were Freemasons. Westcott appears to have been the initial driving force behind the establishment of the Golden Dawn.

The "Golden Dawn" was the first of three Orders, although all three are often collectively referred to as the "Golden Dawn". The First Order taught esoteric philosophy based on the Hermetic Qabalah and personal development through study and awareness of the four classical elements, as well as the basics of astrology, tarot divination, and geomancy. The Second or Inner Order, the Rosae Rubeae et Aureae Crucis, taught magic, including scrying, astral travel, and alchemy.

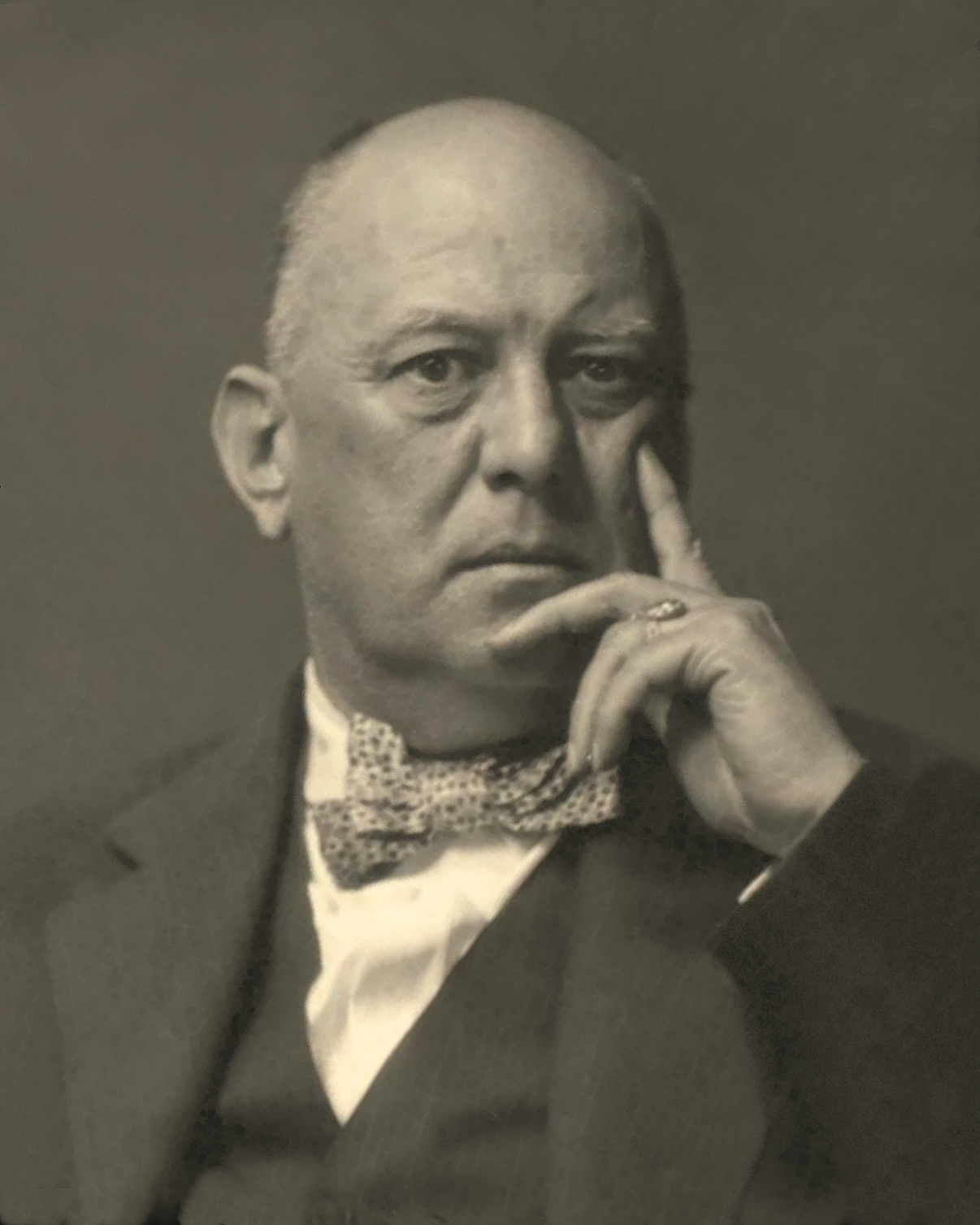
Aleister Crowley, c. 1925

=== Aleister Crowley ===
English author and occultist Aleister Crowley (1875–1947) wrote about magical practices and theory, including those of theurgy ("high magic") and goetia ("low magic"). In The Book of the Law and The Vision and the Voice, the Aramaic magical formula Abracadabra was changed to Abrahadabra, which he called the new formula of the Aeon of Horus. He also famously spelled magic in the archaic manner, as 'magick', to differentiate "the true science of the Magi from all its counterfeits." He also stated that "The spirits of the Goetia are portions of the human brain."

His book Magick, Liber ABA, Book 4, is a lengthy treatise on magic in which he which also presents his own system of Western occult practice, synthesised from many sources, including Yoga, Hermeticism, medieval grimoires, contemporary magical theories from writers like Eliphas Levi and Helena Blavatsky, and his own original contributions. It consists of four parts: Mysticism, Magick (Elementary Theory), Magick in Theory and Practice, and ΘΕΛΗΜΑ—the Law (The Equinox of The Gods). It also includes numerous appendices presenting many rituals and explicatory papers.

=== Dion Fortune ===
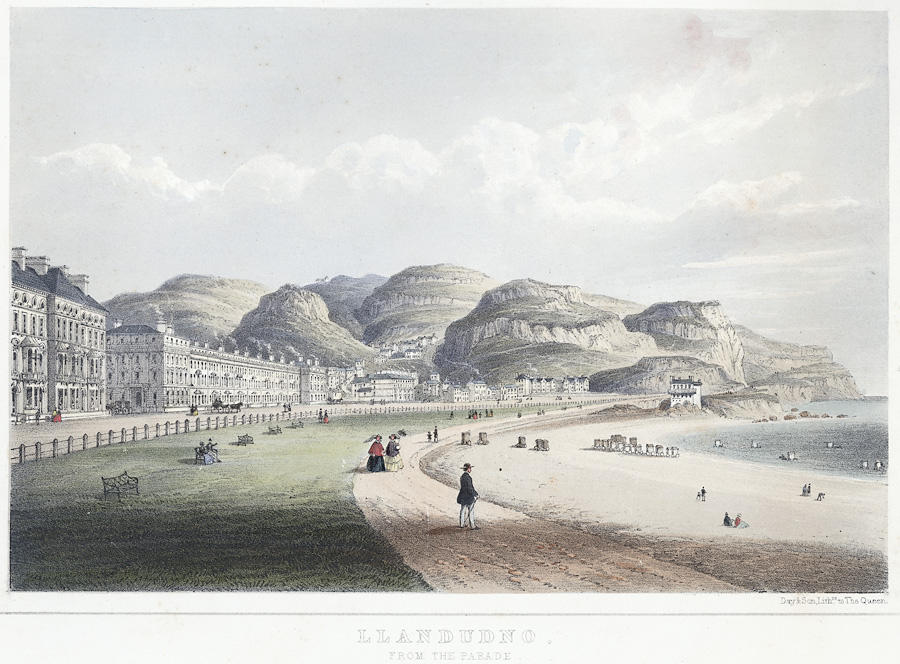
An illustration of Fortune's hometown, Llandudno, in 1860

Dion Fortune (1890–1946) was a Welsh occultist, ceremonial magician, novelist and author. She was a co-founder of the Fraternity of the Inner Light, an occult organisation that promoted philosophies which she claimed had been taught to her by spiritual entities known as the Ascended Masters. A prolific writer, she produced a large number of articles and books on her occult ideas and also authored seven novels, several of which expound occult themes.

Fortune was a ceremonial magician. The magical principles on which her Fraternity was based were adopted from the late nineteenth century Hermetic Order of the Golden Dawn, with other influences coming from Theosophy and Christian Science. The magical ceremonies performed by Fortune's Fraternity were placed into two categories: initiations, in which the candidate was introduced to magical forces, and evocation, in which these forces were manipulated for a given purpose.

The Fraternity's rituals at their Bayswater temple were carried out under a dim light, as Fortune believed that bright light disperses etheric forces. An altar was placed in the centre of a room, with the colours of the altar-cloth and the symbols on the altar varying according to the ceremony being performed. A light was placed on the altar while incense, usually frankincense, was burned. The senior officers sat in a row along the eastern end of the room, while officers—who were believed to be channels for cosmic forces—were positioned at various positions on the floor. The lodge was opened by walking around the room in a circle chanting, with the intent of building a psychic force up as a wall. Next, the cosmic entities would be invoked, with the members believing that these entities would manifest in astral form and interact with the chosen officers.

Fortune was particularly concerned with the issue of sex. She believed that this erotic attraction between men and women could be harnessed for use in magic. She urged her followers to be naked under their robes when carrying out magical rituals, for this would increase the creative sexual tension between the men and women present. Although sex features in her novels, it is never described in graphic detail. The scholar Andrew Radford noted that Fortune's "reactionary and highly heteronormative" view of "sacralised sexuality" should be seen as part of a wider tradition among esoteric currents, going back to the ideas of Emanuel Swedenborg and Andrew Jackson Davis and also being found in the work of occultists like Paschal Beverly Randolph and Ida Craddock.

The religious studies scholar Hugh Urban noted that Fortune was "one of the key links" between early twentieth-century ceremonial magic and the developing Pagan religion of Wicca. Similarly, the Wiccan high priestess Vivianne Crowley characterised Fortune as a "proto-Pagan". The scholar and esotericist Nevill Drury stated that Fortune "in many ways anticipated feminist ideas in contemporary Wicca", particularly through her belief that all goddesses were a manifestation of a single Great Goddess. Graf agreed, adding that Fortune's works found "resonance" in the work of the later feminist Wiccan Starhawk, and in particular in the latter's 1979 book, The Spiral Dance.

In researching ceremonial magic orders and other esoteric groups active in the London area during the 1980s, Luhrmann found that within them, Fortune's novels were treated as "fictionalized ideals" and that they were recommended to newcomers as the best way to understand magic. The Pagan studies scholar Joanne Pearson added that Fortune's books, and in particular the novels The Sea Priestess and Moon Magic, were owned by many Wiccans and other Pagans. The religious studies scholar Graham Harvey compared The Sea Priestess to the Wiccan Gerald Gardner's 1949 novel High Magic's Aid, stating that while neither were "great literature", they "evoke Paganism better than later more didactic works".

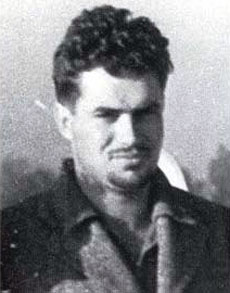
Parsons in 1941

=== Jack Parsons ===
John Whiteside Parsons (1914–1952) was an American rocket engineer, chemist, and Thelemite occultist. Parsons converted to Thelema, the new religious movement founded by the English occultist Aleister Crowley. Together with his first wife, Helen Northrup, Parsons joined the Agape Lodge, the Californian branch of Ordo Templi Orientis (O.T.O.) in 1941. At Crowley's bidding, Parsons replaced Wilfred Talbot Smith as its leader in 1942 and ran the Lodge from his mansion on Orange Grove Boulevard.

Parsons identified four obstacles that prevented humans from achieving and performing their true will, all of which he connected with fear: the fear of incompetence, the fear of the opinion of others, the fear of hurting others, and the fear of insecurity. He insisted that these must be overcome, writing that "The Will must be freed of its fetters. The ruthless examination and destruction of taboos, complexes, frustrations, dislikes, fears and disgusts hostile to the Will is essential to progress."

In 1945, Parsons separated from Helen, after having an affair with her sister Sara; when Sara left him for L. Ron Hubbard, Parsons conducted the Babalon Working, a series of rituals intended to invoke the Thelemic goddess Babalon on Earth. The Babalon Working was a series of magic ceremonies or rituals performed from January to March 1946 by Parsons and Scientology founder L. Ron Hubbard. (Note: Urban (2011), p. 39–42: "The aim of Parson's 'Babalon Working' was first to identify a female partner who would serve as his partner in esoteric sexual rituals; the partner would then become the vessel for the 'magical child' or 'moonchild,' a supernatural offspring that would be the embodiment of ultimate power... According to Parson's account of March 2–3, 1946, Hubbard channeled the voice of Babalon, speaking as the beautiful but terrible lady...") This ritual was essentially designed to manifest an individual incarnation of the archetypal divine feminine called Babalon. The project was based on the ideas of Crowley, and his description of a similar project in his 1917 novel Moonchild. (Note: Urban (2006), pp. 135–137: "The ultimate goal of these operations, carried out during February and March 1946, was to give birth to the magical being, or 'moonchild,' described in Crowley's works. Using the powerful energy of IX degree Sex Magick, the rites were intended to open a doorway through which the goddess Babalon herself might appear in human form.")

When Parsons declared that the first of the series of rituals was complete and successful, he almost immediately met Marjorie Cameron in his own home, and regarded her as the elemental that he and Hubbard had called through the ritual. Soon Parsons began the next stage of the series, an attempt to conceive a child through sex magic workings. Although no child was conceived, this did not affect the result of the ritual to that point. Parsons and Cameron, who Parsons now regarded as the Scarlet Woman, Babalon, called forth by the ritual, soon married.

The rituals performed drew largely upon rituals and sex magic described by Crowley. Crowley was in correspondence with Parsons during the course of the Babalon Working, and warned Parsons of his potential overreactions to the magic he was performing, while simultaneously deriding Parsons' work to others.

A brief text entitled Liber 49, self-referenced within the text as The Book of Babalon, was written by Jack Parsons as a transmission from the goddess or force called 'Babalon' received by him during the Babalon Working. Parsons wrote that Liber 49 constituted a fourth chapter of Crowley's Liber AL Vel Legis (The Book of the Law), the holy text of Thelema.

=== Phyllis Seckler ===
Phyllis Seckler (1917–2004), also known as 'Soror Meral', was a ninth degree (IX°) member of the Sovereign Sanctuary of the Gnosis of Ordo Templi Orientis (O.T.O.), and a lineage holder in the A∴A∴ tradition. She was a student of Jane Wolfe, herself a student of Aleister Crowley.

Sekler was a member of O.T.O. Agape Lodge, the only working Lodge of the O.T.O. at the time of Aleister Crowley's death. Seckler was also instrumental in preserving important parts of Crowley's literary heritage, typing parts of his Confessions, and the complete texts of The Vision and the Voice and Magick Without Tears during the 1950s. Seckler was also instrumental in re-activing the O.T.O. with Grady Louis McMurtry, during the early-mid 1970s, following the death of Crowley's appointed successor, Karl Germer.

Seckler continued her lifelong work with the A∴A∴, founding the College of Thelema and co-founding (with James A. Eshelman) the Temple of Thelema, and later warranting the formation of the Temple of the Silver Star. Seeking to guide her students to an understanding of the Law of Thelema, especially deeper understanding of oneself and of one's magical will, Sekler published the bi-annual Thelemic journal In the Continuum which featured her essays on Thelema and initiation as well as instructional articles for the students of the A.:.A.:., illustrations and essays which help to clarify some of Crowley's thoughts and aid in the understanding of Thelemic principles expressed in Liber AL. Printed for 20 years from 1976 through 1996, In the Continuum also published rare works by Aleister Crowley which at the time were out of print or hard to find.

Seckler served as a master of 418 Lodge of O.T.O. in California from its inception in 1979 until her death.

=== Kenneth Grant ===
Grant in the library of his Golders Green home (taken by Jan Magee in 1978)

Kenneth Grant (1924–2011) was an English ceremonial magician and advocate of the Thelemic religion. A poet, novelist, and writer, he founded his own Thelemic organisation, the Typhonian Ordo Templi Orientis—later renamed the Typhonian Order—with his wife Steffi Grant.

Grant was fascinated by the work of the occultist Aleister Crowley, having read a number of his books. Eager to meet Crowley, Grant wrote letters to Crowley's publishers, asking that they pass his letters on to Crowley himself. These eventually resulted in the first meeting between the two, in autumn 1944, at the Bell Inn in Buckinghamshire. After several further meetings and an exchange of letters, Grant agreed to work for Crowley as his secretary and personal assistant. Now living in relative poverty, Crowley was unable to pay Grant for his services in money, instead paying him in magical instruction.

In March 1945, Grant moved into a lodge cottage in the grounds of Netherwood, a Sussex boarding house where Crowley was living. He continued living there with Crowley for several months, dealing with the old man's correspondences and needs. In turn, he was allowed to read from Crowley's extensive library on occult subjects, and performed ceremonial magic workings with him, becoming a high initiate of Crowley's magical group, Ordo Templi Orientis (O.T.O.). Crowley saw Grant as a potential leader of O.T.O. in the UK, writing in his diary, "value of Grant. If I die or go to the USA, there must be a trained man to take care of the English O.T.O."

Grant drew eclectically on a range of sources in devising his teachings. Although based in Thelema, Grant's Typhonian tradition has been described as "a bricolage of occultism, Neo-Vedanta, Hindu tantra, Western sexual magic, Surrealism, ufology and Lovecraftian gnosis". According to religious studies scholar Gordan Djurdjevic, Grant's writing style is notorious for being opaque with "verbal and conceptual labyrinths". The historian of religion, Manon Hedenborg White, noted that "Grant's writings do not lend themselves easily to systematization". She added that he "deliberately employs cryptic or circuitous modes of argumentation", and lacks clear boundaries between fact and fiction.

Grant promoted what he termed the Typhonian or Draconian tradition of magic, and wrote that Thelema was only a recent manifestation of this wider tradition. In his books, he portrayed the Typhonian tradition as the world's oldest spiritual tradition, writing that it had ancient roots in Africa. Djurdjevic noted that Grant's historical claims regarding Typhonian history were "at best highly speculative" and lacked any supporting evidence, however he suggested that Grant may never have intended these claims to be taken literally.

Grant adopted a perennialist interpretation of the history of religion. Grant's wrote that Indian spiritual traditions like Tantra and Yoga correlate to Western esoteric traditions, and that both stem from a core, ancient source, has parallels in the perennial philosophy promoted by the Traditionalist School of esotericists. He believed that by mastering magic, one masters this illusory universe, gaining personal liberation and recognising that only the Self really exists. Doing so, according to Grant, leads to the discovery of one's true will, the central focus of Thelema.

Grant further wrote that the realm of the Self was known as "the Mauve Zone", and that it could be reached while in a state of deep sleep, where it has the symbolic appearance of a swamp. He also believed that the reality of consciousness, which he deemed the only true reality, was formless and thus presented as a void, although he also taught that it was symbolised by the Hindu goddess Kali and the Thelemic goddess Nuit.

Grant's views on sex magic drew heavily on the importance of sexual dimorphism among humans and the subsequent differentiation of gender roles. Grant taught that the true secret of sex magic were bodily secretions, the most important of which was a woman's menstrual blood. In this he differed from Crowley, who viewed semen as the most important genital secretion. Grant referred to female sexual secretions as kalas, a term adopted from Sanskrit. He thought that because women have kalas, they have oracular and visionary powers. The magical uses of female genital secretions are a recurring theme in Grant's writings.

=== James Lees ===
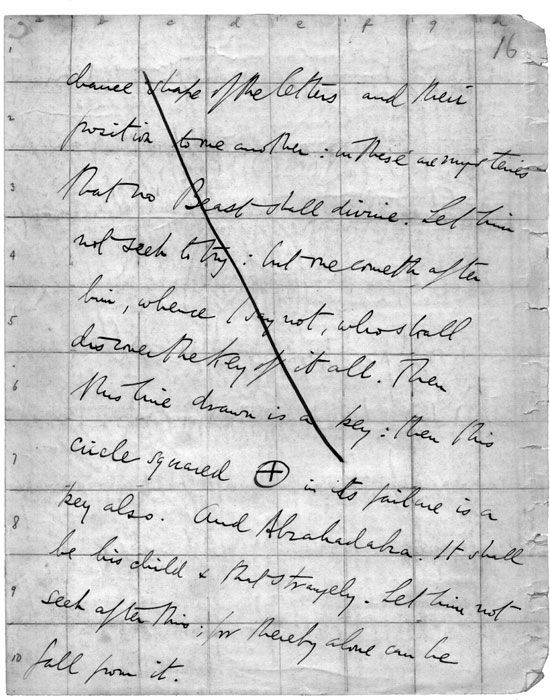
The mysterious 'grid' page of Liber AL's manuscript. "for in the chance shape of the letters and their position to one another: in these are mysteries that no Beast shall divine. ... Then this line drawn is a key: then this circle squared in its failure is a key also. And Abrahadabra."

James Lees (August 22, 1939 – 2015) was an English magician known for inventing the system he called English Qaballa.

Lees was born in Bolton, Lancashire. He established a career as an analytic chemist. In his search for truth, he also studied psychology. Not finding the answers he wanted from science, he turned to the study of astrology, even making a living for a time as a horary astrologer.

Still resolved to discover further answers, Lees decided to study Kabbalah and the Tree of Life. From here he proceeded to experiment with invocations from the Key of Solomon. Satisfied with the results, he proceeded to perform the six month long working described in The Book of Abramelin by means of the Bornless Ritual. Claiming to have successfully invoked his Holy Guardian Angel, he turned his attention to ascending the 'Middle Pillar' of the Tree of Life, culminating with an experience known as crossing the abyss.

Then, in November 1976, Lees constructed the "order & value of the English Alphabet." Following this, Lees founded the O∴A∴A∴ in order to assist others in the pursuit of their own spiritual paths. The first public report of the system known as English Qaballa (EQ) was published in 1979 by Ray Sherwin in an editorial in the final issue of his journal, The New Equinox. Lees subsequently assumed the role of publisher of The New Equinox and, starting in 1981, published additional material about the EQ system over the course of five issues of the journal, extending into 1982.

In 1904, Aleister Crowley wrote out the text of the foundational document of his world-view, known as Liber AL vel Legis, The Book of the Law. In this text was the injunction found at verse 2:55; "Thou shalt obtain the order & value of the English Alphabet, thou shalt find new symbols to attribute them unto" which was understood by Crowley as referring to an English Qabalah yet to be developed or revealed.

The "order & value" constructed by James Lees lays the letters out on the grid superimposed on the page of manuscript of Liber AL on which this verse (Ch. III, v. 47) appears (sheet 16 of Chapter III). Also appearing on this page are a diagonal line and a circled cross. The Book of the Law states that the book should only be printed with Crowley's hand-written version included, suggesting that there are mysteries in the "chance shape of the letters and their position to one another" of Crowley's handwriting. Whichever top-left to bottom-right diagonal is read the magickal order of the letters is obtained.

Little further material on English Qaballa was published until the appearance of Jake Stratton-Kent's book, The Serpent Tongue: Liber 187, in 2011. This was followed in 2016 by The Magickal Language of the Book of the Law: An English Qaballa Primer by Cath Thompson. The creation, exploration, and continuing research and development of the system up to 2010, by James Lees and members of his group in England, are detailed in her 2018 book, All This and a Book.

=== Nema Andahadna ===
Nema Andahadna (1939–2018) practiced and wrote about magic (magical working, as defined by Aleister Crowley) for over thirty years. In 1974, she claimed to have channelled a short book called Liber Pennae Praenumbra.

From her experience with Thelemic magic, she developed her own system of magic called "Maat Magick" which has the aim of transforming the human race. In 1979, she co-founded the Horus-Maat Lodge. The Lodge and her ideas have been featured in the writings of Kenneth Grant.

Her writings have appeared in many publications, including the Cincinnati Journal of Ceremonial Magick, Aeon, and Starfire. According to Donald Michael Kraig:

Nema has been one of the most influential occultists of the last quarter century although most occultists have never read her works. What Nema has done is influence those who have been writers and teachers. They, in turn, influenced the rest of us.

== See also ==
- Astral religion – Worship of stars and other heavenly bodies as deities
- Black Books – Collection of Carl Jung's private journals
- The Book of Abramelin – Book by Abraham of Worms
- Bornless Ritual – Ritual of Western ceremonial magic
- Greek Magical Papyri – Body of papyri from Graeco-Roman Egypt
- Magical organization – Organization for the practice of occult magic
- Medieval European magic – Magic as understood during the Middle Ages
- The Red Book – Manuscript by Carl Jung
- Rosicrucianism – 17th-century European spiritual movement
