= Konstantinos (occultist) =

Konstantinos is the name of a practicing occultist and neopagan and the author of seven spiritual and occult books on nocturnal witchcraft, all published by Llewellyn Worldwide. In a 2002 interview he mentioned additional plans for an Occult Truth series which was to begin with Vampires: The Occult Truth, with the following book being titled Demons: The Occult Truth. This book was not published, and the following title in the Occult Truth series was Werewolves: The Occult Truth which was released in 2010.

Konstantinos has been working on occult and paranormal topics for over twenty years. He has been a guest on various shows and documentaries. He has also written numerous articles over the years. He appeared on Coast to Coast AM hosted by George Noory.

== Bibliography ==
- Konstantinos. Summoning Spirits: The Art of Magical Evocation. St. Paul, Minn:Llewellyn Publications, 1995. ISBN 1-56718-381-6
- Konstantinos. Vampires: The Occult Truth. St. Paul, Minn:Llewellyn Publications, 1996. ISBN 1-56718-380-8
- Konstantinos, Contact the Other Side: 7 Methods for Afterlife Communication. 2001. ISBN 1567183778
- Konstantinos. Gothic Grimoire. St. Paul, Minn:Llewellyn Publications, 2002. ISBN 0-7387-0255-2
- Konstantinos. Nocturnal Witchcraft: Magick After Dark. St. Paul, Minn:Llewellyn Publications, 2002. ISBN 0-7387-0166-1
- Konstantinos. Speak With the Dead: Seven Methods for Spirit Communication. St. Paul, Minn:Llewellyn Publications, 2004. ISBN 0-7387-0522-5
- Konstantinos. Nocturnicon: Calling Dark Forces and Powers. St. Paul, Minn:Llewellyn Publications, 2005. ISBN 0-7387-0832-1
- Konstantinos, Werewolves: The Occult Truth. Llewellyn Worldwide, 2010. ISBN 0-7387-2715-6
