= Lesser ritual of the pentagram =

Ceremonial magic ritual

The lesser ritual of the pentagram (LRP) is a ceremonial magic ritual devised and used by the original order of the Golden Dawn that has become a mainstay in modern occultism. This ritual is considered by many to be a basic preliminary to any other magical work, so much that it was the only ritual, besides initiation rituals, taught to members of the Golden Dawn before they advanced to the Inner Order.

There are two forms of the ritual, the lesser banishing ritual of the pentagram (LBRP), and the lesser invoking ritual of the pentagram (LIRP).

== Description and structure ==
The ritual is highly dynamic, using gesture, visualization and the pronunciation of certain words of power, combining prayer and invocation as well as clearing and preparing a space for further magical or meditative work.

The banishing ritual is perceived as banishing any chaotic or impure forms of the elements from the magician's circle by tracing the pentagrams in the air and by the power of certain divine names. The invoking ritual is perceived to invoke pure forms of the elements.

This is followed by an evocation of the archangels ruling the elements to fortify and guard the circle. These archangels are connected to the classical elements via the astrological symbolism of the biblical four living creatures: "Michael is the 'lion-headed', Raphael the "human-headed", Uriel the "bull-headed", and Gabriel the "eagle-headed". This symbolism connects Michael with the astrological sign Leo and the classical element of fire, Raphael with Aquarius and the element of air, Uriel with Taurus and the element of earth, and Gabriel with Scorpio and the element of water.

One contemporary book on ceremonial magic advises using only the banishing version for the first few months of ceremonial practice:

The Golden Dawn manuscripts advocated performing the invoking form of this ritual in the morning and the banishing form at night. However, we feel that the beginning student needs to concentrate solely on the banishing form for a period of a few months, since beginners have a tendency to light up on the astral and unknowingly attract all manner of elementals and low levels of astral energies. Also, it is far more important to know how to banish than to invoke. Anyone can attract low spiritual energies. Getting rid of the same can be more difficult.

The ritual has an invoking counterpart, the lesser invoking ritual of the pentagram. Together, they are sometimes known as the lesser ritual of the pentagram. Many ceremonial magicians perform the banishing version daily, and some perform both the invoking and banishing versions.

== The ritual ==
=== Equipment ===
In its more elaborate forms, modern practitioners sometimes include the following:

- An altar in the center of the ritual space, upon which are placed instruments representing the four classical elements
- A ceremonial robe (e.g. a tau robe) or other suitable ritual garb is worn by the magician
- A ritual dagger (e.g. an "athame") used to gesture to the points of the Qabalistic Cross, and to draw the pentagrams and the magic circle connecting them.

Often, however, no special equipment or clothing is used.

=== Procedure ===
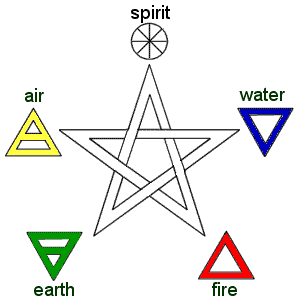
Elemental attribution of the points of the pentagram

The Golden Dawn LBRP consists of three main parts. Though practices vary, the general outline of the LBRP is below:

1. Qabalistic cross, which is meant to construct an astral cross in the body of the magician, with points corresponding to sephiroth on the tree of life using the doxology of the Lord's Prayer. While constructing this cross, the magician vibrates (rather than simply speaks) the Hebrew words Ateh, Malkuth, Ve-Geburah, Ve-Gedulah, Le-Olahm, Amen, while pointing to the forehead, feet, right shoulder, left shoulder and heart, respectively.
2. Formulation of the pentagrams, in which, beginning in the east, a banishing earth pentagram (or an invoking pentagram for the invoking ritual), usually visualised as being in blue light or fire, is drawn in the air at each of the four cardinal points and an associated name of God is vibrated: (YHVH (east, air), Adonai (south, fire), Eheieh (west, water) and AGLA (north, earth). This segment of the ritual is meant to banish or invoke the four elements. The pentagrams are connected by a circle, also drawn in the air, which is completed by returning from the north point to the east.
3. Evocation of the archangels, during which the magician stands in the form of a cross and evokes the presence of archangels, visualising them at the four cardinal points: Raphael (east), Gabriel (west), Michael (south), and Uriel (north). The magician then stands feet shoulder-width apart and says a variation of "...for about me flames the pentagram, and within (or behind) me shines the six-rayed star."
4. The Qabalistic Cross is repeated.

== See also ==
- Royal stars – Persian definition in astronomy
- Tetramorph – Symbolic arrangement of four differing elements
