= Invocation =

Supplication to a supernatural being

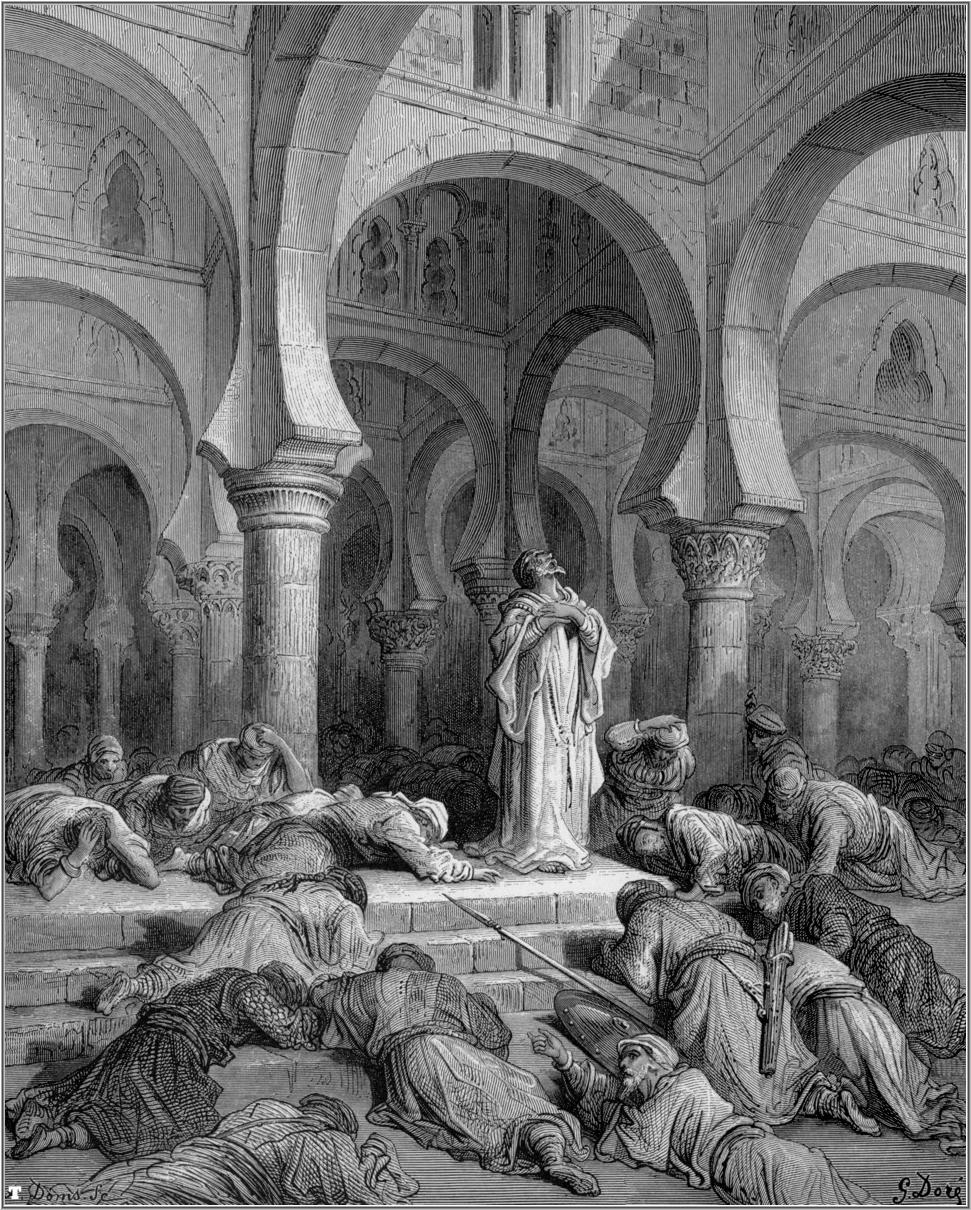
Invocation by Gustave Doré

Invocation is the act of calling upon a deity, spirit, or supernatural force, typically through prayer, ritual, or spoken formula, to seek guidance, assistance, or presence. It is a practice found in numerous religious, spiritual, and esoteric traditions, where it serves to establish a connection between the human and the divine or metaphysical realms. Invocation can be directed toward a singular deity, multiple deities, spirits, or abstract forces, and may involve formal liturgies, spontaneous prayers, chants, or symbolic actions. Unlike evocation, which is generally understood as calling a spirit to appear outside the practitioner, invocation often implies inviting the entity to be present within or to closely align with the practitioner.

The purpose of invocation varies across cultural and religious contexts. In many traditions, it is used to request divine intervention, protection, wisdom, or blessings in personal or communal matters. Invocation may also serve to consecrate a space, mark the beginning of a sacred ritual, or facilitate a deeper spiritual experience. In mystical or esoteric practices, invocation can be a means of aligning oneself with a higher spiritual principle or archetype, fostering personal transformation or enlightenment. In some traditions, the practitioner ritually identifies with the deity or spiritual figure. This is distinct from possession, where the invoked being is believed to inhabit or act through the practitioner directly and autonomously.

The scope of invocation is broad, encompassing a wide range of religious, magical, and philosophical practices. In formal religious contexts, such as Christianity, Hinduism, and Islam, invocation is often integrated into prayers, hymns, and rituals. For example, Christian liturgy frequently includes invocations of the Holy Trinity or saints, while Hindu pujas invoke various deities through mantras and offerings. In ceremonial magic and theurgy, invocation is used to summon divine powers for guidance or to achieve specific spiritual outcomes. Additionally, modern spiritual movements, such as Wicca and modern Paganism, employ invocation to call upon deities, elemental forces, or spirits of nature. Beyond religious practice, invocation has also been explored in psychological frameworks; Carl Jung's concept of active imagination involves engaging with archetypal figures from the unconscious, a process that parallels the symbolic aspects of invocation.

== Historical background ==
Invocation has played a central role in religious, spiritual, and magical practices across diverse cultures and historical periods. Its origins can be traced to ancient civilizations, where invoking deities or supernatural forces was integral to both public rituals and private devotion. As a supplication or prayer, an invocation calls upon God, a god, or a goddess, either in a pre-established form or in the practitioner's own words. An example of a pre-established text for an invocation is the Lord's Prayer.

In ancient Mesopotamia, invocation was deeply embedded in religious ceremonies and daily life. The Sumerians, Akkadians, and Babylonians invoked their gods through hymns, prayers, and ritual offerings to secure protection, favor, and guidance. Texts such as the Enūma Eliš, the Babylonian creation myth, begin with invocations to the gods, emphasizing their foundational role in maintaining cosmic order. Many preserved texts, written in cuneiform characters on clay tablets, are addressed to Shamash, Ishtar, and other deities.

In ancient Egypt, invocation was central to both state-sponsored and personal religious practices. Pharaohs and priests invoked deities during temple rituals, often accompanied by offerings, music, and recitations from sacred texts such as the Book of the Dead. These invocations were believed to maintain ma’at (cosmic balance) and ensure the favor of the gods for both the living and the dead.

In ancient Greece, invocation was a vital element in both public and private worship. The Orphic Hymns, a collection of eighty-seven ancient Greek invocations addressed to various deities, were attributed to the mythical poet Orpheus. Poets such as Homer and Hesiod famously began their epic works with invocations to the Muses, seeking divine inspiration to recount their tales. Religious ceremonies and oracles, like those at Delphi, involved invoking gods such as Apollo for prophecy and guidance. Invocation also played a role in the mystery religions, including the Eleusinian Mysteries, where initiates called upon Demeter and Persephone during secret rites aimed at securing blessings and insights into the afterlife.

In ancient Rome, the adaptation of Greek religious practices retained invocation as a key feature. Roman religious rituals, including augury and sacrifices, required the formal invocation of deities such as Jupiter, Mars, and Venus. Legal and political ceremonies also incorporated invocations, emphasizing the close relationship between religion and governance in Roman society.

In early Christianity, invocation evolved into formalized prayers and liturgies, often directed toward God, Jesus Christ, or the Holy Spirit. Early Christians also invoked saints and martyrs, believing they could intercede with God on behalf of the faithful. Invocation was particularly significant in sacraments such as the Eucharist, where prayers called for the transformation of bread and wine into the body and blood of Christ. This practice expanded during the Middle Ages with the rise of Marian devotion and the invocation of the Virgin Mary in prayers like the Hail Mary.

In Islam, one of the earliest treaties on invocations, attributed to a scholar named Khālid ibn Yazīd, has survived on a papyrus booklet dated 880-881.

Invocation has also been central in mystical and esoteric traditions. In Hermeticism and Neoplatonism, invocation was a key practice in theurgy, where practitioners sought to ascend to higher spiritual realms by invoking divine intelligences. Texts in the Hermetic corpus describe rituals where practitioners call upon cosmic forces for enlightenment and union with the divine. In medieval grimoires, invocation was used to summon angels or spirits for magical purposes, often with complex rituals and protective incantations.

== In the major religions ==
In formal religious rituals, invocation often takes the form of structured prayers or liturgies. In Christianity, invocations are integral to many sacraments and liturgical ceremonies. The Mass begins with invocations calling upon the Holy Trinity, and specific prayers invoke the presence of Christ or the Holy Spirit to consecrate the bread and wine during the Eucharist. Additionally, the Litany of the Saints invokes a list of saints to intercede on behalf of the congregation. In Eastern Orthodox traditions, invocations play a similar role, with prayers directed to the Theotokos (Mother of God) and various saints during services and sacraments. In charismatic Christian traditions, invocation may manifest as spontaneous prayers or speaking in tongues, believed to be inspired by the Holy Spirit.

In Hinduism, invocation is central to puja (ritual worship), where deities are called upon through mantras, offerings, and ritual gestures. The process of avahana (inviting the deity) is a key step in many Hindu rituals, symbolizing the arrival of the divine presence into a murti (sacred image) or ritual space. Mantras like the Gayatri Mantra or invocations to deities such as Ganesha are recited to seek blessings, wisdom, and protection.

In Islam, invocation (duʿāʾ) is an essential aspect of personal and communal worship. While formal prayers (salat) follow prescribed structures, du'a allows for spontaneous, personal invocations of Allah for guidance, forgiveness, and assistance. The 99 Names of Allah are often invoked in these prayers to reflect different aspects of divine mercy and power. Additionally, invocations are made before daily activities, such as beginning meals or embarking on journeys, highlighting the integration of invocation into everyday life.

In Buddhism, invocation is commonly practiced through the chanting of mantras, prayers, and devotional recitations directed toward Buddhas, Bodhisattvas, or protective deities. Rather than appealing to a creator god, these invocations seek guidance, blessings, and the cultivation of virtues such as compassion and wisdom. In Pure Land Buddhism, practitioners invoke Amitabha Buddha through the recitation of the nianfo, aspiring for rebirth in the Pure Land. In Vajrayana traditions, invocation involves complex rituals and deity yoga, where practitioners visualize themselves as enlightened beings like Tara or Avalokiteshvara to embody their qualities and accelerate spiritual progress.

== In indigenous and shamanistic traditions ==
In indigenous and shamanistic traditions, invocation is used to summon spirits, ancestors, or natural forces. Shamans often invoke spirit guides, animal totems, or elemental forces during healing rituals, trance states, or vision quests. These invocations are believed to facilitate communication with the spirit world, allowing the shaman to receive guidance, perform healings, or influence natural phenomena. In many indigenous cultures, invocation is also central to rituals that honor ancestors or seek harmony with the natural world.

== In mysticism and esotericism ==
In mysticism and Western esotericism, invocation serves as a means of aligning with higher spiritual forces or accessing hidden knowledge. In Hermeticism and theurgy, practitioners invoke divine intelligences or cosmic principles to facilitate spiritual ascent or transformation. The Hermetic corpus describes rituals in which the practitioner invokes celestial powers to achieve gnosis (spiritual enlightenment) and union with the divine. In Kabbalistic traditions, practitioners may invoke the names of God or angelic beings through meditative and ritual practices to attain spiritual insights or achieve mystical states.

In ceremonial magic and grimoire traditions, invocation is often used to summon deities, angels, or spirits for specific purposes. Texts like the Key of Solomon and The Lesser Key of Solomon outline complex rituals for invoking spiritual entities, often accompanied by protective symbols, incantations, and ritual tools. These practices aim to establish control over the invoked entities to gain knowledge, power, or other desired outcomes. Aleister Crowley distinguished invocation from evocation, stating:

To "invoke" is to "call in", just as to "evoke" is to "call forth". This is the essential difference between the two branches of Magick. In invocation, the macrocosm floods the consciousness. In evocation, the magician, having become the macrocosm, creates a microcosm.

== In psychology ==
In psychology, invocation can be understood as a process of engaging with internal archetypes, symbols, or aspects of the unconscious mind. While traditional invocation involves calling upon external deities or spiritual forces, psychological interpretations often view this practice as a means of accessing and integrating inner psychological elements. This perspective is particularly prominent in analytical psychology, founded by Carl Jung.

Jung introduced the concept of active imagination, a technique where individuals deliberately engage in dialogue with figures or symbols that emerge from the unconscious. These figures often represent archetypes, such as the Shadow, Anima/Animus, or Wise Old Man, which are universal symbols found across cultures. In this process, the practitioner "invokes" these inner figures, not as literal beings, but as manifestations of deeper psychological truths. By interacting with these symbols, individuals can achieve greater self-awareness, confront repressed emotions, and facilitate personal growth—a process Jung called individuation.

Invocation in this context is also related to the concept of self-suggestion and affirmation, where individuals use specific language or rituals to influence their mental and emotional states. This can be seen in practices like visualization, mantra repetition, and affirmations, which aim to align the conscious mind with desired goals or emotional outcomes.

Moreover, invocation has been studied within the field of transpersonal psychology, which examines the spiritual aspects of human experience. Here, invocation is viewed as a way to transcend the ego and connect with a larger sense of self, the universe, or the divine, whether interpreted literally or symbolically.

== In modern spiritual practice ==
In modern spiritual movements, invocation continues to play a significant role. In Wicca and modern Paganism, invocation is used to call upon deities, elemental forces, or spirits of nature during rituals and seasonal celebrations. The Drawing Down the Moon ritual, for example, involves invoking the Goddess to speak or act through the practitioner, fostering a direct connection with the divine.

In New Age practices, invocation may involve calling upon spirit guides, ascended masters, or cosmic energies for personal growth, healing, or manifestation.

In the currents of early theistic Satanism, Maxine Dietrich introduced the concept of 'respectful' invocation. Unlike earlier methods of Goetic summoning, which often involved commanding or coercing spirits, this approach emphasized a more respectful and cooperative relationship with the entities being invoked.

== As a form of possession ==
The ecstatic, possessory form of invocation may be compared to loa possession in the Vodou tradition where devotees are described as being "ridden" or "mounted" by the deity or spirit. In 1995 National Geographic journalist Carol Beckwith described events she had witnessed during Vodoun possessions:

A woman splashed sand into her eyes, a man cut his belly with shards of glass but did not bleed, another swallowed fire. Nearby a believer, perhaps a yam farmer or fisherman, heated hand-wrought knives in crackling flames. Then another man brought one of the knives to his tongue. We cringed at the sight and were dumbfounded when, after several repetitions, his tongue had not even reddened.

Possessive invocation has also been described in certain Norse rites where Odin is invoked to "ride" workers of seidr (Norse shamanism), much like the god rides his eight-legged horse Sleipnir. Indeed, forms of possessive invocation appear throughout the world in most mystical or ecstatic traditions, wherever devotees seek to touch upon the essence of a deity or spirit.

== See also ==
- Prana pratishtha – Hindu religious ceremony
