= Thaumaturgy =

Working of magical feats by an individual

Thaumaturgy (/ˈθɔːmətɜːrdʒi/), especially in Western esotericism, is the art of performing prodigies or miracles. More generically, it refers to the practical application of magic to effect change in the physical world.

Historically, thaumaturgy has been associated with a supernatural or divine ability, the manipulation of natural forces, the creation of wonders, and the performance of magical feats through esoteric knowledge and ritual practice. Unlike theurgy, which focuses on invoking divine powers, or alchemy, a proto-scientific form of natural philosophy, thaumaturgy is concerned with utilizing occult principles to achieve specific supernatural outcomes, often in a tangible and observable manner. It is sometimes translated into English as wonderworking.

Thaumaturgy is defined as the "science" or "physics" of magic by Isaac Bonewits in his 1971 book Real Magic. A practitioner of thaumaturgy is a "thaumaturge", "thaumaturgist", "thaumaturgus", "miracle worker", or "wonderworker".

The Calendar of saints of different Christian denominations celebrates the 3rd century saint Gregory Thaumaturgus, a religious man, theologian and one of the Fathers of the Church.

== Etymology ==
The word thaumaturgy derives from Greek θαῦμα thaûma, meaning "miracle" or "marvel" (final t from the genitive thaûmatos) and ἔργον érgon, meaning "work". In the 16th century, the word thaumaturgy entered the English language meaning miraculous or magical powers. The word was first anglicized and used in the magical sense in John Dee's book The Mathematicall Praeface to Elements of Geometrie of Euclid of Megara (1570). He mentions an "art mathematical" called "thaumaturgy... which giveth certain order to make strange works, of the sense to be perceived and of men greatly to be wondered at".

== Historical development ==
=== Ancient roots ===
The origins of thaumaturgy can be traced back to ancient civilizations where magical practices were integral to both religious rituals and daily life. In ancient Egypt, priests were often regarded as thaumaturges, wielding their knowledge of rituals and incantations to influence natural and supernatural forces. These practices were aimed at protecting the Pharaoh, ensuring a successful harvest, or even controlling the weather. Similarly, in ancient Greece, certain figures were believed to possess the ability to perform miraculous feats, often attributed to their deep understanding of the mysteries of the gods and nature. This blending of religious and magical practices laid the groundwork for what would later be recognized as thaumaturgy in Western esotericism.

In Greek writings, the term thaumaturge also referred to several Christian saints. In this context, the word is usually translated into English as 'wonderworker'. Notable early Christian thaumaturges include Gregory Thaumaturgus (c. 213 – c. 270), Saint Menas of Egypt (285 – c. 309), Saint Nicholas (270–343), and Philomena (fl. c. 300 (?)).

=== Medieval and Renaissance Europe ===
During the medieval period, thaumaturgy evolved within the context of Christian mysticism and early scientific thought. The medieval understanding of thaumaturgy was closely linked to the idea of miracles, with saints and holy men often credited with thaumaturgic powers. The seventeenth-century Irish Franciscan editor John Colgan called the three early Irish saints, Patrick, Brigid, and Columba, thaumaturges in his Acta Triadis Thaumaturgae (Louvain, 1647). Later notable medieval Christian thaumaturges include Anthony of Padua (1195–1231) and the bishop of Fiesole, Andrew Corsini of the Carmelites (1302–1373), who was called a thaumaturge during his lifetime. This period also saw the development of grimoires—manuals for magical practices—where rituals and spells were documented, often blending Christian and pagan traditions.

In the Renaissance, the concept of thaumaturgy expanded as scholars like John Dee explored the intersections between magic, science, and religion. Dee's Mathematicall Praeface to Elements of Geometrie of Euclid of Megara (1570) is one of the earliest English texts to discuss thaumaturgy, describing it as the art of creating "strange works" through a combination of natural and mathematical principles. Dee's work reflects the Renaissance pursuit of knowledge that blurred the lines between the magical and the mechanical, as thaumaturges were often seen as early scientists who harnessed the hidden powers of nature.

In Dee's time, "the Mathematicks" referred not merely to the abstract computations associated with the term today, but to physical mechanical devices which employed mathematical principles in their design. These devices, operated by means of compressed air, springs, strings, pulleys or levers, were seen by unsophisticated people (who did not understand their working principles) as magical devices which could only have been made with the aid of demons and devils.

By building such mechanical devices, Dee earned a reputation as a conjurer "dreaded" by neighborhood children. He complained of this assessment in his Mathematicall Praeface:

And for these, and such like marvellous Actes and Feates, Naturally, and Mechanically, wrought and contrived: ought any honest Student and Modest Christian Philosopher, be counted, & called a Conjurer? Shall the folly of Idiotes, and the Malice of the Scornfull, so much prevaille ... Shall that man, be (in hugger mugger) condemned, as a Companion of the hellhoundes, and a Caller, and Conjurer of wicked and damned Spirites?

Notable Renaissance and Age of Enlightenment Christian thaumaturges of the period include Gerard Majella (1726–1755), Ambrose of Optina (1812–1891), and John of Kronstadt (1829–1908).

=== Incorporation into modern esotericism ===
The transition into modern esotericism saw thaumaturgy taking on a more structured role within various magical systems, particularly those developed in the 18th and 19th centuries. In Hermeticism and the Western occult tradition, thaumaturgy was often practiced alongside alchemy and theurgy, with a focus on manipulating the material world through ritual and symbolic action. The Hermetic Order of the Golden Dawn, a prominent magical order founded in the late 19th century, incorporated thaumaturgy into its curriculum, emphasizing the importance of both theory and practice in the mastery of magical arts.

Thaumaturgy's role in modern esotericism also intersects with the rise of ceremonial magic, where it is often employed to achieve specific, practical outcomes—ranging from healing to the invocation of spirits. Contemporary magicians continue to explore and adapt thaumaturgic practices, often drawing from a wide range of historical and cultural sources to create eclectic and personalized systems of magic.

== Core principles and practices ==
=== Principles of sympathy and contagion ===
Thaumaturgy is often governed by two key magical principles: the Principle of Sympathy and the Principle of Contagion. These principles are foundational in understanding how thaumaturges approach their attempts to influence the physical world through magical means. The Principle of Sympathy operates on the idea that "like affects like", meaning that objects or symbols that resemble each other can influence each other. For example, a miniature representation of a desired outcome, such as a model of a bridge, could be used in a ritual to ensure the successful construction of an actual bridge. The Principle of Contagion, on the other hand, is based on the belief that objects that were once in contact continue to influence each other even after they are separated. This principle is often employed in the use of personal items, such as hair or clothing, in rituals to affect the person to whom those items belong.

These principles are not unique to thaumaturgy but are integral to many forms of magic across cultures. However, in the context of thaumaturgy, they are particularly important because they provide a theoretical framework for understanding how magical actions can produce tangible results in the material world. This focus on practical outcomes distinguishes thaumaturgy from other forms of magic that may be more concerned with spiritual or symbolic meanings.

=== Tools and rituals ===
Thaumaturgical practices often involve the use of specific tools and rituals designed to channel and direct magical energy. Common tools include wands, staffs, talismans, and ritual knives, each of which serves a particular purpose in the practice of magic. For instance, a wand might be used to direct energy during a ritual, while a talisman could serve as a focal point for the thaumaturge's intent. The creation and consecration of these tools are themselves ritualized processes, often requiring specific materials and astrological timing to ensure their effectiveness.

Rituals in thaumaturgy are typically elaborate and may involve the recitation of incantations, the drawing of protective circles, and the invocation of spirits or deities. These rituals are designed to create a controlled environment in which the thaumaturge can manipulate natural forces according to their will. The complexity of these rituals varies depending on the desired outcome, with more significant or ambitious goals requiring more intricate and time-consuming procedures.

=== Energy manipulation ===
At the heart of thaumaturgy is the metaphor of energy manipulation. Thaumaturges believe that the world is filled with various forms of energy that can be harnessed and directed through magical practices. This energy is often conceptualized as a natural force that permeates the universe, and through the use of specific techniques, thaumaturges believe that they can influence this energy to bring about desired changes in the physical world.

Energy manipulation in thaumaturgy involves both drawing energy from the surrounding environment and directing it toward a specific goal. This process often requires a deep understanding of the natural world, as well as the ability to focus and control one's own mental and spiritual energies. In many traditions, this energy is also linked to the practitioner's life force, meaning that the act of performing thaumaturgy can be physically and spiritually taxing. As a result, practitioners often undergo rigorous training and preparation to build their capacity to manipulate energy effectively and safely.

== In esoteric traditions ==
=== Hermetic Qabalah ===
In Hermetic Qabalah, thaumaturgy occupies a significant role as it involves the practical application of mystical principles to influence the physical world. This tradition is deeply rooted in the concept of correspondences, where different elements of the cosmos are seen as interconnected. In the Hermetic tradition, a thaumaturge seeks to manipulate these correspondences to bring about desired changes. The sephiroth on the Tree of Life serve as a map for these interactions, with specific rituals and symbols corresponding to different sephiroth and their associated powers. For example, a ritual focusing on Yesod (the sephirah of the Moon) might involve elements such as silver, the color white, and the invocation of lunar deities to influence matters of intuition, dreams, or the subconscious mind.

The manipulation of these correspondences through ritual is not just symbolic but is believed to produce real effects in the material world. Practitioners use complex rituals that might include the use of sacred geometry, invocations, and the creation of talismans. These practices are believed to align the practitioner with the forces they wish to control, creating a sympathetic connection that enables them to direct these forces effectively. Aleister Crowley's Magick (Book 4) provides an extensive discussion on the use of ritual tools such as the wand, cup, and sword, each of which corresponds to different elements and powers within the Qabalistic system, emphasizing the practical aspect of these tools in thaumaturgic practices.

=== Alchemy and thaumaturgy ===
Alchemy and thaumaturgy are often intertwined, particularly in the context of spiritual transformation and the pursuit of enlightenment. Alchemy, with its focus on the transmutation of base metals into gold and the quest for the philosopher's stone, can be seen as a form of thaumaturgy where the practitioner seeks to transform not just physical substances but also the self. This process, known as the Great Work, involves the purification and refinement of both matter and spirit. Thaumaturgy comes into play as the practical aspect of alchemy, where rituals, symbols, and substances are used to facilitate these transformations.

The alchemical process is heavily laden with symbolic meanings, with each stage representing a different phase of transformation. The stages of nigredo (blackening), albedo (whitening), citrinitas (yellowing), and rubedo (reddening) correspond not only to physical changes in the material being worked on but also to stages of spiritual purification and enlightenment. Thaumaturgy, in this context, is the application of these principles to achieve tangible results, whether in the form of creating alchemical elixirs, talismans, or achieving spiritual goals. Crowley also elaborates on these alchemical principles in Magick (Book 4), particularly in his discussions on the symbolic and practical uses of alchemical symbols and processes within magical rituals.

=== Other esoteric systems ===
Thaumaturgy also plays a role in various other esoteric systems, where it is often viewed as a means of bridging the gap between the mundane and the divine. In Theosophy, for example, thaumaturgy is seen as part of the esoteric knowledge that allows practitioners to manipulate spiritual and material forces. Theosophical teachings emphasize the unity of all life and the interconnection of the cosmos, with thaumaturgy being a practical tool for engaging with these truths. Rituals and meditative practices are used to align the practitioner's will with higher spiritual forces, enabling them to effect change in the physical world.

In Rosicrucianism, thaumaturgy is similarly regarded as a method of spiritual practice that leads to the mastery of natural and spiritual laws. Rosicrucians believe that through the study of nature and the application of esoteric principles, one can achieve a deep understanding of the cosmos and develop the ability to influence it. This includes the use of rituals, symbols, and sacred texts to bring about spiritual growth and material success.

In the introduction of his translation of the "Spiritual Powers (神通 Jinzū)" chapter of Dōgen's Shōbōgenzō, Carl Bielefeldt refers to the powers developed by adepts of Esoteric Buddhism as belonging to the "thaumaturgical tradition". These powers, known as siddhi or abhijñā, were ascribed to the Buddha and subsequent disciples. Legendary monks like Bodhidharma, Upagupta, Padmasambhava, and others were depicted in popular legends and hagiographical accounts as wielding various supernatural powers.

== Misconceptions and modern interpretations ==
=== Distinction from theurgy ===
A common misconception about thaumaturgy is its conflation with theurgy. While both involve the practice of magic, they serve distinct purposes and operate on different principles. Theurgy is primarily concerned with invoking divine or spiritual beings to achieve union with the divine, often for purposes of spiritual ascent or enlightenment. Thaumaturgy, on the other hand, focuses on the manipulation of natural forces to produce tangible effects in the physical world. This distinction is crucial in understanding the differing objectives of these practices: theurgy is inherently religious and mystical, while thaumaturgy is more pragmatic and results-oriented.

Aleister Crowley, in his Magick (Book 4), emphasizes the importance of understanding these differences, noting that while theurgic practices seek to align the practitioner with divine will, thaumaturgy allows the practitioner to exert their will over the material world through the application of esoteric knowledge and ritual.

== See also ==
- Behenian fixed star – Application in medieval astrology
- Bornless Ritual – Ritual of Western ceremonial magic
- Contagion heuristic – Perceived transfer of negative qualities through contact
- Correspondence – Theological term for the relationship between two levels of existence
- Goetia (magic) – Invocation of demons
- Magical thinking – Belief in the connection of unrelated events
- Natural magic – Natural science during the Renaissance
- Practical kabbalah – Branch of the Jewish mystical tradition that concerns the use of magic
- Sigil – Magical symbol; for example, the sigils of the Behenian fixed stars
- Thelema – New religious movement founded by Aleister Crowley
