= Sympathetic magic =

Type of magic based on imitation or correspondence

Sympathetic magic, also known as imitative magic, is a type of magic based on imitation or correspondence.

== Similarity and contagion ==
James George Frazer coined the term "sympathetic magic" in The Golden Bough (1889); Richard Andree, however, had anticipated Frazer, writing of sympathy-enchantment (German: Sympathie-Zauber) in his 1878 Ethnographische Parallelen und Vergleiche. Frazer subcategorised sympathetic magic into two varieties: that relying on similarity, and that relying on contact or "contagion":

If we analyze the principles of thought on which magic is based, they will probably be found to resolve themselves into two: first, that like produces like, or that an effect resembles its cause; and, second, that things which have once been in contact with each other continue to act on each other at a distance after the physical contact has been severed. The former principle may be called the Law of Similarity, the latter the Law of Contact or Contagion. From the first of these principles, namely the Law of Similarity, the magician infers that he can produce any effect he desires merely by imitating it: from the second he infers that whatever he does to a material object will affect equally the person with whom the object was once in contact, whether it formed part of his body or not.

== Imitation ==
Imitation involves using effigies, fetishes, or poppets to affect the environment of people, or people themselves. Voodoo dolls are an example of fetishes used in this way: the practitioner uses a lock of hair on the doll to create a link (also known as a "taglock") between the doll and the donor of this lock of hair. In this way, that which happens to the doll will also happen to the person.

== Correspondence ==
Correspondence is based on the idea that one can influence something based on its relationship or resemblance to another thing. Many popular beliefs regarding properties of plants, fruits, and vegetables have evolved in the folk-medicine of different societies owing to sympathetic magic. This includes beliefs that certain herbs with yellow sap can cure jaundice, that walnuts could strengthen the brain because of the nuts' resemblance to brains, that red beet juice is good for the blood, that phallic-shaped roots will cure male impotence, etc; many of these fall under the Doctrine of Signatures.

Many traditional societies believed that an effect on one object can cause an analogous effect on another, without an apparent causal link between the two objects. For instance, many tales feature a villain whose "life" exists in another object, and who can only be killed if that other object is destroyed, such as in the Russian folktale of Koschei the Deathless, or The Picture of Dorian Gray. Mircea Eliade wrote that in Uganda, a barren woman is thought to cause a barren garden, and her husband can seek a divorce on purely economic grounds.

Many societies have been documented as believing that, instead of requiring an image of an individual, influence can be exerted using something that they have touched or used. Consequently, the inhabitants of Tanna, Vanuatu, in the 1970s were cautious when throwing away food or losing a fingernail, as they believed these small scraps of personal items could be used to cast a spell causing fevers. Similarly, an 18th-century compendium of Russian folk magic describes how someone could be influenced through sprinkling cursed salt on a path frequently used by the victim, while a 15th-century crown princess of Joseon Korea is recorded as having cut her husband's lovers' shoes into pieces and burnt them.

== Hypotheses about prehistoric use ==
Sympathetic magic has been considered in relation to Paleolithic cave paintings such as those in North Africa and at Lascaux in France. The theory, which is partially based on studies of more modern hunter-gatherer societies, is that the paintings were made by magic practitioners who could potentially be described as shamans. The shamans would retreat into the darkness of the caves, enter into a trance state and then paint images of their visions, perhaps with some notion of drawing power out of the cave walls themselves. This goes some way towards explaining the remoteness of some of the paintings (which often occur in deep or small caves) and the variety of subject matter (from prey animals to predators and human hand-prints). In his book Primitive Mythology, Joseph Campbell stated that the paintings "were associated with the magic of the hunt". For him, this sympathetic magic was akin to a participation mystique, where the paintings, drawn in a sanctuary of "timeless principle", were acted upon by rite.

In 1933, Leo Frobenius, discussing cave paintings in North Africa, pointed out that many of the paintings did not seem to be mere depictions of animals and people. To him, it seemed as if they were acting out a hunt before it began, perhaps as a consecration of the animal to be killed. In this way, the pictures served to secure a successful hunt. While others interpreted the cave images as depictions of hunting accidents or of ceremonies, Frobenius believed it was much more likely that "what was undertaken [in the paintings] was a consecration of the animal effected not through any real confrontation of man and beast but by a depiction of a concept of the mind."

In 2005, Francis Thackeray published a paper in the journal Antiquity, in which he recognised that there was a strong case for the principle of sympathetic magic in southern Africa in prehistory. For example, a rock engraving from Wonderwerk Cave in South Africa (dated at 4000 years before the present, BP) showed a zebra which had probably been "symbolically wounded", with incisions on the rump being associated with wounds. Ochre on the engraved slab could represent blood. A prehistoric rock painting at Melikane in Lesotho shows what appear to be men (shamans) bending forward like animals, with two sticks to represent the front legs of an antelope. Thackeray suggests that these men, perhaps shamans or "medicine-men" dressed under animal skins, were associated with hunting rituals of the kind recorded by H. Lichtenstein in 1812 in South Africa, in which a hunter simulated an antelope which was symbolically killed by other hunters, in the belief that this was essential for a successful hunt. Such rituals could be represented in prehistoric art such as paintings at Melikane in Lesotho. Thackeray suggests that the Melikane therianthropes are associated with both trance and the principle of sympathetic hunting magic. In 2005, in the journal Antiquity, Francis Thackeray suggests that there is even a photograph of such rituals, recorded in 1934 at Logageng in the southern Kalahari, South Africa. Such rituals may have been closely associated with both roan antelope and eland, and other animals.

In the Brandberg in Namibia, in the so-called "White Lady" panel recorded by the Abbé Henri Breuil and Harald Pager, there are "symbolic wounds" on the belly of a gemsbok-like therianthrope (catalogued as T1), which might relate to the principle of sympathetic hunting magic and trance, as suggested by Thackeray in 2013.

At the Apollo 11 cave in Namibia, Erich Wendt discovered mobile art about 30,000 years old, including a stone broken in two pieces, with a gemsbok-like therianthrope that closely resembles the Brandberg therianthrope which Thackeray catalogues as T1. Both examples of art may be related to sympathetic hunting magic and shamanism.

In 2013, Thackeray emphasised that in southern Africa, the principle of sympathetic hunting magic and shamanism (trance) were not mutually exclusive.

However, as with all prehistory, it is impossible to be certain due to the limited evidence and the many pitfalls associated with trying to understand the prehistoric mindset with a modern mind.

== Modern examples ==
Though Frazer thought that sympathetic magic was a problem for undeveloped people, psychologist Paul Rozin and others have tested sympathetic magic using Ivy League college students. Regarding the principle of similarity, they found that the students were hesitant to eat fudge that had been molded to resemble dog feces. The principle of contagion was also evaluated by asking the students to drink some water that had been exposed to a sterilized cockroach, and again most students were hesitant. In addition, students were unenthusiastic when asked to don a T-shirt that had been worn by someone un-liked―even if the T-shirt had been washed. Rozin et al. found that not only past exposure resulted in sympathetic magic, but future exposure could as well. In an experiment in 1992, people did not want to put on a sweater that had been worn by someone with AIDS (past exposure). Many people also evaluated a Holiday Inn as less than ideal, if they knew that the same hotel was to be transformed into a facility for AIDS patients (future exposure).

Conversely, items such as holy water that are thought to magically possess healing powers can be ruined via scientific contagion. Researchers asked participants their opinion regarding holy water that had been processed to remove minerals (a "scientific process"); which were then put back. The participants felt that the water would be fine for drinking, but that it would have lost its religiosity.

== See also ==
- Apotropaic magic – Magic intended to repel evil
- Contagion heuristic – Perceived transfer of negative qualities through contact; in psychology, the belief, often unconscious, that objects or locations associated with a good or bad past experience still have good or bad qualities
- Correspondence – Theological term for the relationship between two levels of existence; coined by Emanuel Swedenborg
- Law of contagion – Folk belief ― magical principle that any two objects that were once in contact will maintain an invisible connection unless it is deliberately broken
- Magic – Practice of supernatural beings and forces
- Magical thinking – Belief in the connection of unrelated events
- Natural magic – Natural science during the Renaissance
- Psychometry – Aspect of extrasensory perception―purported ability to receive mental images of a past event by touching an object associated with the event
- Sigil – Magical symbol
- Table of magical correspondences – List of relations between magical objects
- Thaumaturgy – Working of magical feats by an individual
- Totem – Emblem of a group of people
- True name § Folklore and literature
