= De Telluribus in Mundo Nostro Solari =

Book by Emanuel Swedenborg

Concerning the Earths in Our Solar System
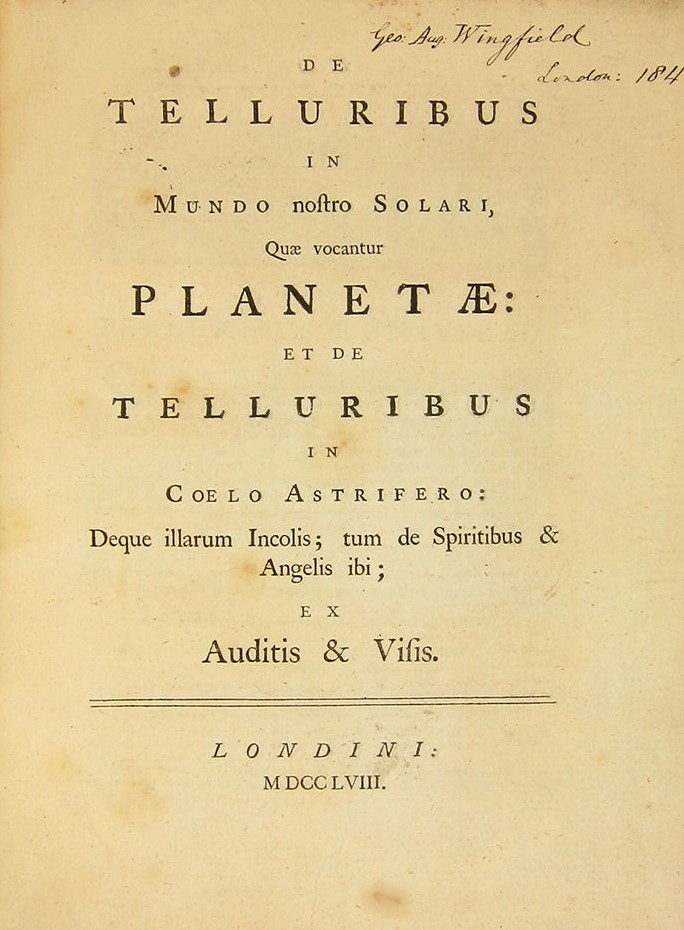
- Author: Emanuel Swedenborg
- Original title: De Telluribus in Mundo Nostro Solari
- Language: Latin
- Publication date: 1758
- English publication date: 1787

De Telluribus in Mundo Nostro Solari (Concerning the Earths in Our Solar System or Earths in the Universe) is a 1758 treatise by Swedish polymath Emanuel Swedenborg. Taking the form of an account in which Swedenborg claimed communication with extra-terrestrials, the work was used to explore his theological ideas. The book contained content originally published in Arcana Cœlestia, which was in turn drawn from Swedenborg's personal journal.

== Background ==
=== Intellectual context ===
Works dealing with the question of other inhabited worlds have existed since at least ancient times, mainly in the context of discussions of cosmology. However, with the development of heliocentrism and of more empirical sciences, greater speculative stories about intelligent life on other worlds—the plurality of worlds—began to develop. These stories, such as Francis Godwin's The Man in the Moone, often came with a theological message.

=== Swedenborg ===
Emanuel Swedenborg was a Swedish mine assessor, natural philosopher, biblical exegete, theologian and spirit-seer. In his early life his works had mainly been scientific and mathematical, but after a religious conversion in the mid-1740s he pivoted entirely to spiritual and mystical works—with his claimed clairvoyance making him famous.

== Content ==
Swedenborg is informed by an angel that the other planets—or earths—are inhabited by humans−all part of "The Great Man". In Swedenborg's conception each planet and its inhabitants represents some faculty—or even organ—of this "Great Man", with for example, the natives of Mercury representing memory. What follows is a tour of each of the then known planets, as well as some from other star systems. Swedenborg himself claims to have accessed this information by "traveling" the mundo spirituali or the 'spirit world'.

The book is divided in two with the solar planets in the first half—ordered Mercury, Jupiter, Mars, Saturn, Venus and the Moon; apparently according to their spirituality—and then the extrasolar planets.

The inhabitants of these planets are by and large all represented as non-materialistic, high minded and virtuous. They are mostly shown as living close to nature and away from centralized governments. Those of Mercury are spiritual, those of Mars without hypocrisy and those of Jupiter committed to education and children.

== Reception ==
Contemporary reception was generally negative, particularly after its translation into German in 1770, by Friedrich Christoph Oetinger. This was largely down to Swedenborg's infamy as an alleged spirit-seer. The preface to the 1787 English translation called it "merely visionary, groundless and enthusiastic, and the fruit only of a light or disordered imagination".

The professor of religion, Benjamin E. Zeller has described De Telluribus as a forerunner of UFO religious thought—which came to prominence in the 20th century.
