= Table of magical correspondences =

List of relations between magical objects

A table of magical correspondences is a list of magical correspondences between items belonging to different categories, such as correspondences between certain deities, heavenly bodies, plants, perfumes, precious stones, etc. Such lists were compiled by 19th-century occultists like Samuel Liddell Mathers and William Wynn Westcott (both members of the Hermetic Order of the Golden Dawn), who in the 1890s prepared an (unpublished) manuscript called The Book of Correspondences. This manuscript was later reworked by Aleister Crowley, who anonymously published it in 1909 as Liber 777. These tables of correspondences were meant to be used in a ceremonial context, where specific magical objects were assigned to specific deities or Kabbalistic emanations (sefirot).

== See also ==
- Doctrine of signatures
- Ceremonial magic
- Correspondence, a concept in the philosophy of the 18th-century theologian Emanuel Swedenborg
- Grimoire

== Works cited ==
- Drury, Nevill (2009). "The Modern Magical Revival". In Lewis, James R.; Pizza, Murphy (eds.). Handbook of Contemporary Paganism. Leiden: Brill. pp. 13–80. doi:10.1163/ej.9789004163737.i-650.7. ISBN 978-90-04-16373-7.
- Kaczynski, Richard (2010). Perdurabo: The Life of Aleister Crowley. Berkeley: North Atlantic Books. ISBN 9781556438998.
