= Swedenborg 1714 Flying Machine =

1714 sketch by the Swedish scientist Emanuel Swedenborg

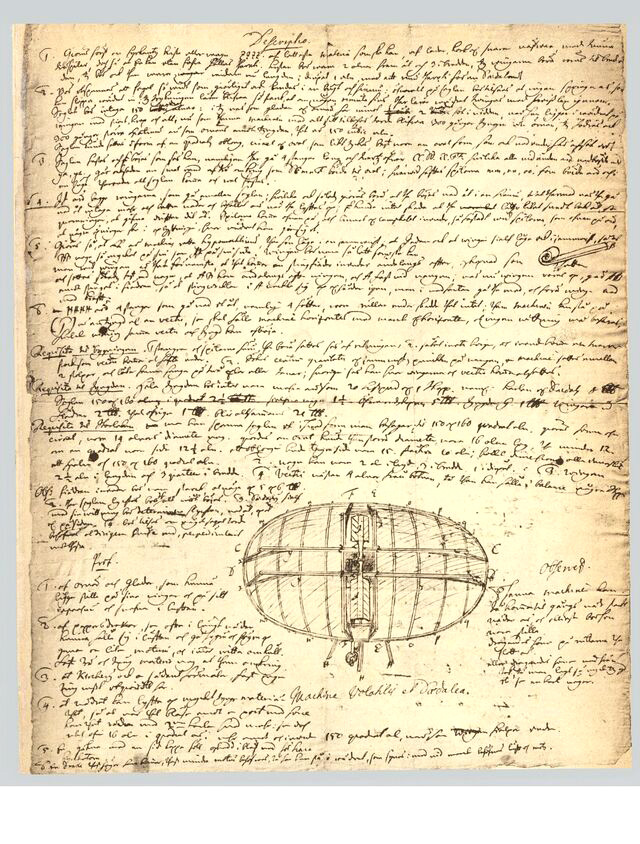
The Flying Machine, sketched in his notebook from 1714. See Smithsonian model and explanation by Dr. Paul Garber, former Curator of the Smithsonian Air and Space Museum, on the principle of flight of the aircraft. His descriptions may be found in a chapter of the Söderburg book, p. 32, or on the video clip at 5:48 on its timeline. Dr. Garber also closely supervised the construction of the Smithsonian model of the machine.

Swedenborg's Flying Machine was first sketched by the Swedish scientist Emanuel Swedenborg in 1714, when he was 26 years old. It was later published in his periodical, Daedalus Hyperboreus, in 1716. While Leonardo da Vinci’s designs predate those of Swedenborg, da Vinci’s manuscripts remained unknown due to a variety of circumstances until the late 19th century. So, in terms of influence, Swedenborg predated da Vinci.

== Background ==
Swedenborg's flying machine was not widely known until his notebook containing the sketch was discovered in 1867-1868 at the Diocesan Library at Linköping, Sweden by a visiting researcher from the United States of America. It dates from 1714 and is referred to as "The Manuscript": the published description is referred to as "The Published Account".

== The published account ==
When Swedenborg returned to Sweden in 1714, he met with inventor Christopher Polhem and together with him published the periodical Daedalus Hyperboreus. When Swedenborg mentioned publishing the Flying Machine, Polhem was skeptical as to whether it was possible to ever build a machine that could fly. He compared it to building a perpetuum mobile. But Swedenborg replied with a quote by French author Bernard le Bovier de Fontenelle:

The art of flying is hardly yet born. It will be perfected and some day people will fly up to the moon. Do we pretend to have discovered everything, or to have brought our knowledge to a point where nothing can be added to it? Oh, for mercy's sake, let us agree that there is still something left for the ages to come!

Swedenborg published it anonymously with the title Machine to Fly in the Air. It did not contain an image.

Swedenborg knew that the machine would not fly, but suggested it as a start and was confident that the problem would be solved. He said, "It seems easier to talk of such a machine than to put it into actuality, for it requires greater force and less weight than exists in a human body. The science of mechanics might perhaps suggest a means, namely, a strong spiral spring. If these advantages and requisites are observed, perhaps in time to come some one might know how better to utilize our sketch and cause some addition to be made so as to accomplish that which we can only suggest. Yet there are sufficient proofs and examples from nature that such flights can take place without danger, although when the first trials are made you may have to pay for the experience, and not mind an arm or leg." This greater force would not become possible until the motor was invented.

== Technical description ==
The image shows the flying machine from above looking down. It consists of one large wing. In the middle of it is a hole with a basket, where the pilot stands. There are two "paddles" on the wings. These are used by the pilot like oars in a boat, except in this case they only move up and down. Underneath the ship is the landing gear; it consists of four long poles, which, except for the ends of two, can not be seen since they are below the ship. In between them is a weight, which is used to keep the ship balanced.

The wing is a light frame covered with strong canvas. The large wing would work as a glider, and by working the paddles up and down the pilot would keep the plane in the air, Swedenborg initially hoped.

== Legacy ==
Swedenborg's machine was evaluated by the Royal Aeronautical Society in 1910. Its editor wrote that the machine constituted "…the first rational proposal for a flying machine of the aeroplance [heavier-than-air] type…" Later working heavier-than-air flying machines were built (e.g.Wright Brothers) so Swedenborg's machine did not play any part in the further development of aviation.”

== See also ==
- History of aviation § Heavier than air
