= Arcana Cœlestia =

Book on theology by Emanuel Swedenborg

The Arcana Cœlestia, quae in Scriptura Sacra seu Verbo Domini sunt, detecta, usually abbreviated as Arcana Cœlestia (Heavenly Mysteries or Secrets of Heaven) or Arcana Cælestia, is an eight-volume theological work published by Emanuel Swedenborg in the 1750s.

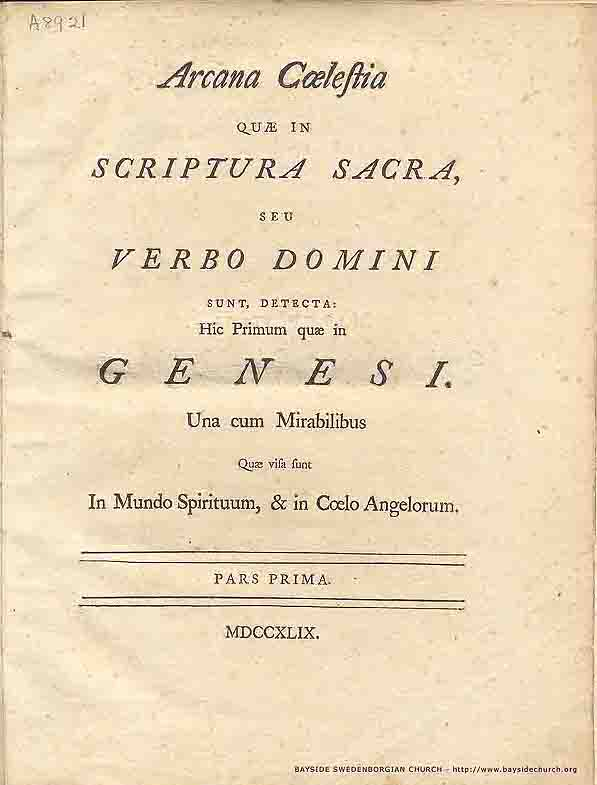
Arcana Cœlestia, first edition (1749), title page

== Overview ==
Swedenborg was born in Sweden in 1688. His father was a Christian pastor in the Lutheran Church. The first part of his life was devoted to studying sciences, especially metallurgy. In 1740 he published Oeconomia Regni Animalis (Dynamics of the Soul's Domain), where he looked at connections between the spiritual and physical worlds. In 1744 he had a spiritual awakening and started to record his experiences and visions. Arcana Cœlestia was his first theological publication. It was published in London, partly to avoid Swedish anti-heresy laws.

== Ideas ==
- Correspondences: for Swedenborg, everything in the Bible has a corresponding spiritual meaning, e.g. Egypt corresponds to material and worldly knowledge.
- Regeneration: Swedenborg views the Bible's story arc ultimately represents the soul's rebirth. It begins in chaos, then in ignorance, and ends with unity with God. Particularly, he views the lineage of Abraham, Isaac, Jacob and Joseph as representative of the stages of this regeneration.
- Afterlife: Detailed descriptions of heaven and hell are given, with unique opinions on: angelology, marriage and the corporeal effects of spirits. Swedenborg continues the descriptions in his later work, Heaven and Hell (1758).

== Structure ==
The publication is a spiritual interpretation of Genesis and Exodus (the first two books of the Bible), according to the doctrine of correspondence (theology), and demonstrated by many supporting quotations from the Hebrew Bible and the New Testament. While not denying the historicity of the stories of the Patriarchs and the Exodus from Egypt, it explains them as describing symbolically the process of spiritual growth and struggles in each individual person.

The volumes are laid out as follows;

Volume	Latin (Chapters)	English (Chapters)
1	Gen 1–15	Gen 1–9
2	Gen 16–21	Gen 10–17
3	Gen 22–30	Gen 18–22
4	Gen 31–40	Gen 23–27
5	Gen 41–50	Gen 29–31
6	Exod 1–15	Gen 32–38
7	Exod 16–24	Gen 39–43
8	Exod 25–40	Gen 44–50
9	—	Exod 1–12
10	—	Exod 13–21
11	—	Exod 22–28
12	—	Exod 29–40

== Preface ==
The opening paragraph of Arcana Coelestia Volume 1 is the opening statement of the corpus of theological work that Swedenborg claimed was revealed to him.

From the mere letter of the Word of the Old Testament no one would ever discern the fact that this part of the Word contains deep secrets of heaven, and that everything within it both in general and in particular bears reference to the Lord, to His heaven, to the church, to religious belief, and to all things connected therewith; for from the letter or sense of the letter all that anyone can see is that - to speak generally - everything therein has reference merely to the external rites and ordinances of the Jewish Church. Yet the truth is that everywhere in that Word there are internal things which never appear at all in the external things except a very few which the Lord revealed and explained to the Apostles; such as that the sacrifices signify the Lord; that the land of Canaan and Jerusalem signify heaven - on which account they are called the Heavenly Canaan and Jerusalem - and that Paradise has a similar signification. (Arcana Cœlestia #1)

== Editions ==
There have been several translations made of Arcana Cœlestia (together with the rest of Swedenborg's theological work), including:

=== Swedenborg Foundation Standard Edition (12 volumes) ===
Volumes of the Standard Edition were originally issued from 1929 to 1956, with the majority in 1938.

=== Swedenborg Society (12 volumes) ===
This is a new contemporary translation.

=== Swedenborg Foundation New Century Edition (3 of 15 volumes currently available) ===
This edition was updated in the 1900s.

=== The Neo-Latin original (8 volumes) ===
Swedenborg's theological work the Arcana Coelestia, published from 1749 to 1756 were originally written in Neo-Latin.

=== The first translation into English ===
The translation from Neo-Latin into English was commissioned by Swedenborg himself.

=== Summaries and comments ===
The Reviser Preface contains a summary of the publishing history for the work originally published by Swedenborg.

== Bibliography ==
- ISBN 0-87785-214-6
- ISBN 978-0-87785-214-8
- Sigstedt, C., The Swedenborg Epic. The Life and Works of Emanuel Swedenborg (New York: Bookman Associates, 1952, Chapter 27)
