= Contagion heuristic =

Perceived transfer of negative qualities through contact

The contagion heuristic is a psychological heuristic which follows the law of contagion and the law of similarity, leading people to avoid contact with people or objects viewed as "contaminated" by previous contact with someone or something viewed as bad—or, less often, to seek contact with objects that have been in contact with people or things considered good. For example, people tend to view food that has touched the ground as contaminated by the ground, and therefore unfit to eat, or view a person who has touched a diseased person as likely to carry the disease (regardless of the actual contagiousness of the disease).

The contagion heuristic can include "magical thinking", in which well-educated adults will think that touching an object transfers their qualities ("essence") to it: for example, a sweater worn by Adolf Hitler is thought to bear his negative essence and to be capable of transmitting it to another wearer. The perception of essence-transfer extends to rituals to purify items viewed as spiritually contaminated, such as having Mother Teresa wear Hitler's sweater to counteract his essence.

== Types ==
The contagion heuristic can be separated into three categories:

=== Positive or negative ===
Contagion can be negative or positive depending on how the contaminating object or person is perceived.

Negative contagion occurs when a seemingly negative object comes into contact with another object. For example, a brief contact of food with an object seen as disgusting will render the object "contaminated" regardless of the actual implications to the object such as the transfer of viruses. Hence this might lead to an irrational rejection of the food.

Positive contagion occurs when a seemingly positive object comes into contact with another object.

In both these examples, contact is required as in the law of contagion however, this can also be applied to an object associated with another. For example, reluctance to come in contact with a plastic replica of an object perceived as disgusting (negative) even though there are no negative implications from touching it.

=== Forwards or backwards ===
The forwards contagion heuristic occurs when an object has been in contact with someone or something else seen as positively or negatively contaminated. For example, forward contagion occurs when someone is now in contact with, or about to consume, a piece of food that has touched the ground.

The backwards contagion heuristic occurs with objects that come into contact with something or someone else seen as positively or negatively contaminated. For example, the unwillingness to allow one's personal objects to come into possession of people who are disliked. Findings from Kramer and Block show that consumers may be less willing to accept a high auction price for a teddy bear they were selling if the person buying was perceived to be of low moral quality (such as a sex offender) as opposed to high moral quality (e.g. a mother of a young child)

For the backward contagion to be more effective the person should have owned it rather than mere contact.

=== Physical or non-physical ===
There is a range of ways an item or person can become contaminated. These were grouped after testing the 'predicted purification potency' which is the level at which the object can be 'de-contaminated' by an action: e.g. washing.

==== Physical sources ====
1. Physical Germ Model
  Carried by a living invisible entity.(e.g. Salmonella)
2. Physical Residue Model
  (e.g. Dandruff, Sweat)
3. Associative Model
  How much an object reminds the person of something or someone

In the cases of 1 and 2, the predicted purity potency turned out to be highly similar. In both cases, they are effectively moderated by washing, especially in the case of source 2.

For the associative model, a change in the appearance of the object seemed to be highly effective. In this case, physical contact is not required (but is seen as more contaminated if it occurs) for the object to be seen as contaminated and hence differs from the above two cases. However, it is distinguishable from non-physical models as there is no spiritual element.

==== Non-physical sources ====
1. Symbolic Interaction Model
  Interaction with something of symbolic importance (e.g. sacramental bread which for certain individuals is simply the combination of wheat flour, yeast, water and salt without its contact with a holy person like a priest)
2. Spiritual Essence Model
  When the 'essence' of a person is transferred to an object or person by contact. (e.g., a jumper owned by Hitler is seen as negatively contaminated as his 'essence' has transferred and he is generally perceived as of low moral quality)

These non-physical sources of contagion are more difficult to erase than the above three physical sources however, they both tend to be effectively reduced by opposite valence contact; that is, an opposite but equal force. For example, to reduce the negative contaminants on Hitler's jumper, someone of high moral quality will be needed to counteract the 'essence'.

== Discovery ==
Anthropologists suggested a contagion heuristic or more specifically magic thinking when traditional societies were observed doing cultural practices such as transferring a person's identity (or soul) to inanimate objects such as fingernails and hair which were seen as highly "contagious". Furthermore, these beliefs continued to also include objects that had been in physical contact with the person.

Whilst initially thought to only apply to traditional societies, further research by Rozin and Nemeroff showed that it could also be applied to Western societies. Observing that the contagion heuristic seems to only apply to humans, they created three routes of reasoning.

1. A rejection of potentially offensive food: People are unlikely to touch foods that elicit disgust in attempts to protect our health (e.g. disgust towards uncooked chicken as it is seen as contaminated with potential harmful microorganisms like salmonella).
2. Illness transfer between humans: Avoid touching a 'contaminated' ill person due to fear of getting ill.
3. Support Relationships: Positive contagion encourages highly intimate acts with people perceived as positively contaminated such as family and lovers. (sexual intimacy which would otherwise elicit disgust without love and lust)

Hence, the contagion heuristic seems to be a pre-adaptation, that is it evolved to be beneficial to health and relationships, supporting the survival of our species, but now no longer serves a person in the current environment.

== Critiques ==
- Positive contagion is relatively weak and might just be an over-extension of the negative contagion principle. This is most likely due to the negative bias: that is, when given two cases, one of negative and one of positive of equal force, the negative case will have a greater impact. As an old Russian phrase states, "A spoonful of tar can spoil a barrel of honey, but a spoonful of honey does nothing for a barrel of tar.″
- The associative model doesn't require any physical contact as stated as necessary in the Laws of Contagion, therefore can be seen as an alternative to contagion rather than part of it. For example, we are more inclined to consume food when the word 'natural' is involved regardless of the actual content; the positive contaminant of the word 'natural' is enough to alter decisions due to our associations with the word.
- Inattention: People tend not to think about the interpersonal history of entities that are seen as contaminated. When they receive change in a shop, they do not think of the long string of humans, who handled it previously.

== Variation ==
=== Age ===
As the contagion heuristic stems from understanding that harmful microbes can exist in certain foods, this limits the extent to which children apply this heuristic. This is because the knowledge and understanding of invisible sources of contamination such as germs and how they spread or multiply are not understandable to young children. Studies have shown that at the age of 3-5, children begin to develop contagion sensitivity (degree to which someone knows if something is contaminated or not). Whilst they begin to acknowledge entities as negatively contaminated, they do not understand the biological reasoning until an older age.

=== Culture and religion ===
Cultural variation plays a large role in disgust as it affects what is seen as positive or negative and hence certain societies may react to different contaminants. For example, cultural traditions such as removing shoes upon entering a house is practiced by many Asian societies (due to negative contamination) however not by American societies.

A study by Rozin and Nemeroff shows that religious groups have their own rules on what is seen as contaminated. The experiment explored whether Jews following the Laws of Kashrut would consume kosher foods that had been in contact or association with non-kosher entities. The report showed that even when the food is only contaminated by similarity (e.g. vegetarian bacon), most would deter from consumption. However, these problems can be controlled by creating rituals to decontaminate the food or setting limits on how contamination. In Judaism, the boundary of allowing non-kosher entities contaminate kosher food is 1/60th of the total volume of the contaminated good given the contamination occurs by accident.

== See also ==
- Projective identification
- Sacred contagion
- Sympathetic magic
- Social intuitionism
