= Law of contagion =

Folk belief

The law of contagion is a folk belief that suggests that once two people or objects have been in contact, a magical link persists between them unless or until a formal cleansing, consecration, exorcism, or other act of banishing breaks the non-material bond. The first description of the law of contagion appeared in The Golden Bough by James George Frazer.

== Benefits and dangers ==
According to this law, contagion has both dangers and benefits. Benefits, for example, include that the holiness of a saint, god or other venerated figure confers benefits to relics, as do temples and churches, by virtue of their having religious rituals conducted within them. Psychics and mediums commonly utilize an object once owned by a missing or deceased subject as their "focus" for psychometry or clairvoyance or during séances.

Dangers include, for example, a sorcerer or witch might acquire a lock of hair, nail clipping or scrap of clothing in order to facilitate a curse. Voodoo dolls resemble the victim and often incorporate hair or clothing from them. In cultures that practice sorcery individuals often exercise care that their hair or nails do not end up in the hands of sorcerers.

== Unconscious belief in the law of contagion ==
Even among people who do not profess a belief in magic, psychological experiments have shown a reluctance on the part of the public to, say, try on a sweater worn by a serial murderer.

== See also ==
- Contagion heuristic
- Psychometry (paranormal)
- Sympathetic magic
- Totem
- True name § Folklore and literature
