= Heaven and Hell (Swedenborg book) =

Book giving a detailed description of the Afterlife

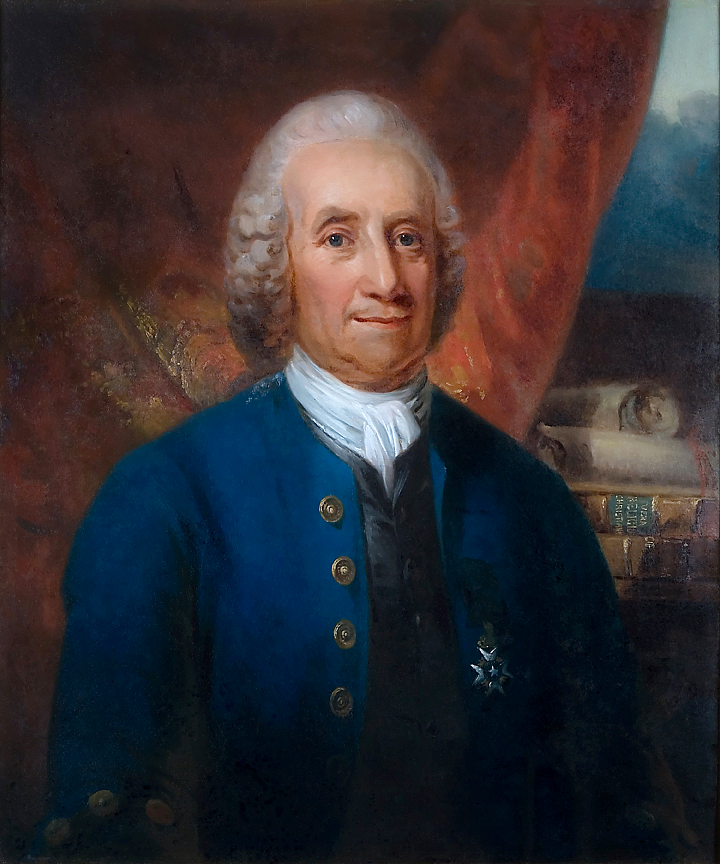
Portrait of Swedenborg by Carl Frederik von Breda

Heaven and Hell (also Heaven and its Wonders and Hell From Things Heard and Seen or, in Latin: De Caelo et Eius Mirabilibus et de inferno, ex Auditis et Visis) is a book written by Emanuel Swedenborg in Latin, published in 1758. It gives a detailed description of the afterlife; how people live after the death of the physical body.

The work proved to be influential. It has been translated into a number of languages, including Danish, French, English, Hindi, Russian, Spanish, Icelandic, Swedish, Serbian and Zulu. A variety of important cultural figures, both writers and artists, were influenced by Swedenborg, including Johnny Appleseed, Jorge Luis Borges, Daniel Burnham, Arthur Conan Doyle, Ralph Waldo Emerson, John Flaxman, George Inness, Henry James, Sr., Carl Jung, Immanuel Kant, Honoré de Balzac, Helen Keller, Czesław Miłosz, August Strindberg, D. T. Suzuki, and W. B. Yeats. William Blake came from a family of Swedenborgians and annotated his copy of this text, as well as referred to and criticized Heaven and Hell and Swedenborg by name several times in his poetical/theological essay The Marriage of Heaven and Hell. Edgar Allan Poe mentions this book in his work The Fall of the House of Usher. It also plays an important role in Honoré de Balzac's novel Louis Lambert.

Swedenborg wrote about Heaven and Hell based on what he said was revelation from God. According to Swedenborg, God is love itself and intends everyone to go to heaven. That was His purpose for creation. Thus, God is never angry, Swedenborg says, and does not cast anyone into Hell. The appearance of Him being angry at evil-doers was permitted due to the primitive level of understanding of people in Biblical times. Specifically, holy fear was needed to keep the people of those times from sinking irretrievably into the consequences of their evils. The holy fear idea was in keeping with the fundamental truth that even they could understand, that everything comes from Jehovah. In the internal, spiritual sense of the Word, however, revealed in Swedenborg’s works, God can be clearly seen for the loving Person He actually is.

== Basic teachings ==
=== God is One ===
Heaven and Hell opens with an affirmation of the many statements in the Old and New Testaments (e.g., Deuteronomy 6:4, Isaiah 44:6, 45: 14, 21, Mark 12: 29,32, John 1:18, Revelation 11:17) and Swedenborg’s revelation (e.g.,) that there is a God and He is one. If God is all-powerful, He must be one. It is self-contradictory to say that there is more than one being who is all-powerful.

=== Angels ===
Swedenborg details a life after death that consists of real experiences in a world in many basic ways quite similar to the natural world. According to Swedenborg, angels in heaven do not have an ethereal or ephemeral existence but enjoy an active life of service to others. They sleep and wake, love, breathe, eat, talk, read, work, play, and worship. They live a genuine life in a real spiritual body and world.

According to Swedenborg, we in the natural world can only see angels here when our spiritual eyes are opened. This corresponds to many instances in the Old Testament and New Testament (Matthew 18, Luke 2:14, Matthew 17, Luke 24, Revelation 1:10). Swedenborg received his revelation by the same process of his spiritual eyes being opened by God.

An angel’s whole environment – clothes, houses, towns, plants, etc. – are what Swedenborg terms correspondences. In other words, their environment spiritually reflects, and thus "corresponds" to, the mental state of the angel and changes as the angel's state changes.

Swedenborg writes that angels have no power of their own. God's power works through the angels to restrain evil spirits, one angel being able to restrain a thousand such spirits all at once. Angels exercise God's power chiefly in defending people against hell. Swedenborg is explicitly clear that angels have no power whatsoever of their own, they neither take nor like to receive thanks or accept any credit.

In the Christian world it is believed that in the beginning angels and devils were created in heaven, also that the devil or Satan was an angel of light, but having rebelled he was cast down with his crew, and thus hell was formed. Swedenborg states that, on the contrary, every angel or devil began life as an inhabitant of the human race. In other words, there are no angels or demons who were not people on Earth first.

Children who die go directly to heaven, where they are raised by angel mothers.

=== Men and women ===
Angels are men and women in every detail just as they were here on earth, only they are spiritual and thus more perfect. See Chapter on “Marriage in Heaven” in Heaven and Hell and Swedenborg’s book on the topic, Marriage Love (Conjugal Love in older translations).

The spiritual conjunction of husband and wife that is the basis of true marriage in this world and the next is explained in Heaven and Hell # 366ff. and Marriage Love #156ff.

The states of [true marriage love] are innocence, peace, tranquility, intimate friendship, full trust and a desire shared by the disposition and heart of each to do the other all the good they can. All these things give rise to blessedness, bliss, joy and pleasure, and by their everlasting heavenly happiness.

— Marriage Love #180

Swedenborg says that this true married love was known in antiquity but largely lost since then, mainly due to loss in belief that this love is eternal and that there is life after death.

=== Christian marriage ideal ===
According to Swedenborg, married life continues after death as before, agreeing with the instinctive conviction of poets and lovers whose inward assurances tell them their love will surmount death and that they will live again and love again in human form. In other words, there is no “till death do us part” of happily married couples. (See “The Lord God Jesus Christ on marriage in heaven”)

Swedenborg also says that Christian marriage - the love of one man and one woman - is the highest of all loves, the source of the greatest bliss. “For in themselves Christian marriages are so holy that there is nothing more holy. They are the seminaries of the human race, and the human race is the seminary of the heavens.” In heavenly marriages neither partner tries to dominate the other since love of dominion of one partner eliminates the delight of that marriage.

Swedenborg says that couples who lived in a chaste love of Christian marriage are more than all others in the order and form of heaven, and therefore in all beauty, and continue unceasingly in the flower of youth. The delights of their love are ineffable, and increase to eternity. What their outward delights are it is impossible to describe in human words.

=== Polygamy ===
“Polygamy” is used here to describe any marital relationship between men and women other than one husband with one wife. A further variant is “Multiple Partners, but One at a Time” (i.e., serial monogamy). If done for evil reasons, such as lust, it constitutes “successive polygamy.”

Swedenborg said in his revelation that true marriage love between one husband and several wives is impossible for its spiritual origin, which is the formation of one mind out of two, is thus destroyed. He says that love that is divided among a number of partners is not true marriage love, but lasciviousness. According to Swedenborg, a man who marries more than one wife commits not only natural adultery but also spiritual adultery. In the highest sense to commit adultery means to deny the divinity of Jesus Christ and to profane the Word. Adultery is so great an evil, Swedenborg says, "that it may be called diabolism itself". After death the damnation of polygamists is more severe than the damnation of those who committed only natural adultery. In the other life adulterers love filth and live in filthy hells.

=== Time and space in the spiritual world ===
There is neither time nor space as we understand them in the other world. Both are replaced by a sense of state. See Chapter 18, “Time in Heaven” and Chapter 22, “Space in Heaven,” in Swedenborg E. Heaven and Hell, Swedenborg Foundation 1946, # 70, 191

=== World of Spirits ===
The "World of Spirits" is not to be confused with “the spiritual world,” which is a general term referring to the whole extent of Heaven, Hell and the World of Spirits. The traditional Christian idea was of resurrection on Judgment Day at the end of history. Swedenborg says judgment takes place in the World of Spirits immediately after each individual’s death. After we die, we wake up in the intermediate region of the spiritual world, neither in Heaven nor Hell, but in a neutral "no man's land" that Swedenborg terms the "World of Spirits." Here we gradually lose the ability to pretend and the spiritual “real us” comes out. The resulting stripping of one's self bare, even to one's most secret thoughts and intentions, is the judgment. “There is nothing concealed that shall not be uncovered, and nothing secret that shall not be known …” (Luke 12:2, 3; Matthew 10:26, Heaven and Hell, #498). Following this judgment the new spirit goes on to Heaven or Hell of his or her own free will. God does not force them. Spirits gather with those that are alike to themselves, whether in Heaven or Hell. Each Spirit is granted Angels and good Spirits, though evil spirits cannot endure their presence and so depart.

=== Equilibrium and spiritual free will ===
According to Swedenborg, people are kept in spiritual freedom by means of the equilibrium between Heaven and Hell.

So who sends people to Heaven or Hell? Nobody but themselves. There is no inquiry as to their faith or former church affiliations, or whether they were baptized, or even what kind of life they lived on Earth. They migrate toward a heavenly or hellish state because they are drawn to its way of life, and for no other reason.

Anyone can enter heaven. However, as soon as an evil person inhales the air there they have excruciating torment so they quickly shun it and escape to a place in keeping with their true state. As the old saying goes, “Where the tree falls, there it lies.” The basic spiritual orientation of a person toward good or evil cannot be changed after death. Thus, an evil spirit could leave hell, but never wants to.

=== Heaven ===
Swedenborg proposed that there were a multiplicity of heavens, divided into "celestial", "spiritual", and "natural" parts. In Heaven and Hell, Swedenborg allegorically likens both the nature of each heaven as well as the illumination in the sky of each heaven to the sun, moon, and stars respectively. He states that the sun of the celestial heaven and the moon of the spiritual kingdom is the Lord.

==== Parallel with Latter Day Saint afterlife beliefs ====
Swedenborg's multiple-heavens conception of the afterlife resembles the Latter Day Saint view of the afterlife described in Doctrine and Covenants Section 76.

On February 16, 1832 Joseph Smith—the progenitor of the Latter Day Saint movement—and Sidney Rigdon—a former Baptist minister associated with Alexander Campbell's movement who converted to the Church of Christ and served as a scribe and assistant to Smith—had a joint visionary experience in Hiram, Ohio while meditating on the meaning of John 5:29. The vision they described was recorded as a revelation known to early Latter Day Saints as "the Vision" and later canonized as Doctrine and Covenants 76. Like Heaven and Hell, "the Vision" rejected a binary afterlife of eternal heaven or hell as inconsistent with God's love for humanity. Instead, "the Vision" described a heaven divided into three "degrees of glory" called the celestial, terrestrial, and telestial kingdoms and likened to the "glory of the sun," moon, and stars respectively.

The shared conception of a multi-tiered heaven may derive from the New Testament writings attributed to the apostle Paul.

== Print versions ==
- Swedenborg, E. Heaven and its wonders and Hell from things heard and seen. Swedenborg Foundation, December 1, 2001. Translator: George F. Dole, Language: English. ISBN 0-87785-476-9
- A 1958 translation: ISBN 0-85448-054-4
