= Emanuel Swedenborg =

Swedish scientist, philosopher, and theologian (1688–1772)

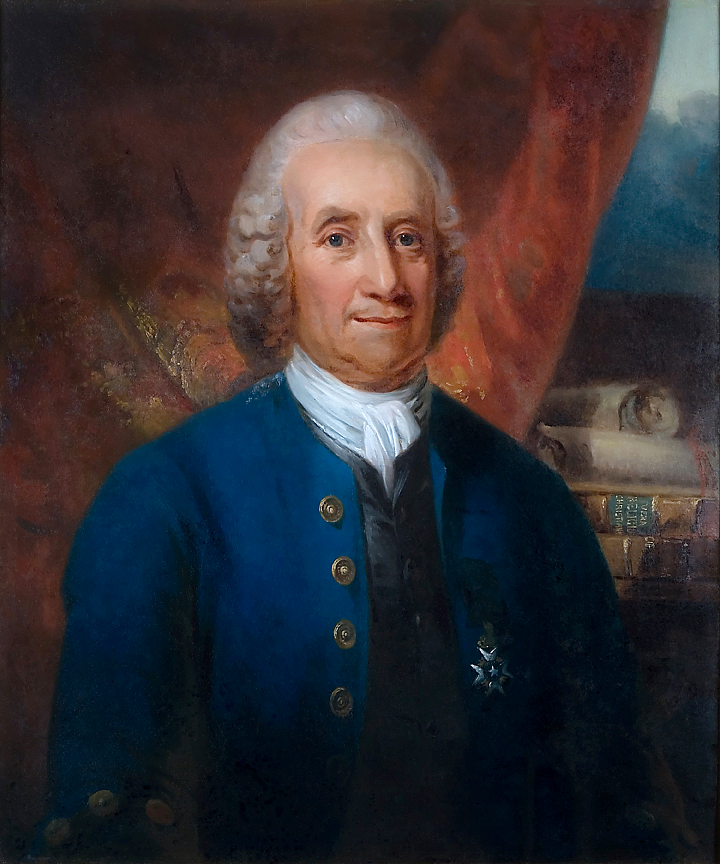
- Portrait by Carl Frederik von Breda
- Born: Emanuel Swedberg; 29 January 1688; Stockholm, Sweden
- Died: 29 March 1772 (aged 84); London, England
- Education: Uppsala University
- Occupations: Theologian; mining engineer; anatomist; astronomer; author
- Notable work: Arcana Cœlestia; True Christian Religion; Heaven and Hell
- Theological work
- Era: 18th-century
- Tradition or movement: Esoteric Christianity; inspired the New Church
- Main interests: Theology; science; philosophy
- Notable ideas: Trinity in one person; Correspondence; The Last Judgment and Christ's Second Coming as having spiritually commenced in 1757

Signature
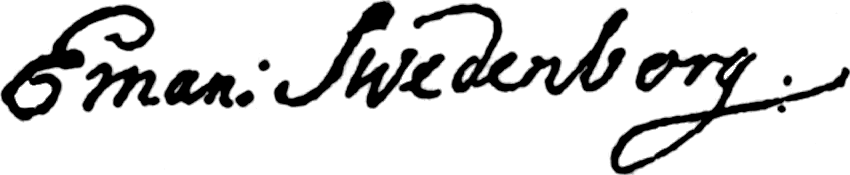

Emanuel Swedenborg (/ˈswiːdənbɔːrɡ/; Swedish: [ɛˈmɑ̂ːnʉɛl ˈsvêːdɛnˌbɔrj]; born Emanuel Swedberg; 29 January 1688 – 29 March 1772) was a Swedish polymath; a scientist, engineer, astronomer, anatomist, Christian theologian, philosopher, and mystic. He became best known for his book on the afterlife, Heaven and Hell (1758).

Swedenborg had a prolific career as an inventor and scientist. In 1741, at 53, he entered into a spiritual phase in which he began to experience dreams and visions, notably on Easter Weekend, on 6 April 1744. His experiences culminated in a "spiritual awakening" in which he received a revelation that Jesus Christ had appointed him to write The Heavenly Doctrine to reform Christianity. According to The Heavenly Doctrine, the Lord had opened Swedenborg's spiritual eyes so that from then on, he could freely visit heaven and hell to converse with angels, demons, and other spirits and that the Last Judgment had already occurred in 1757, the year before the 1758 publication of De Nova Hierosolyma et ejus doctrina coelesti (English: Concerning the New Jerusalem and its Heavenly Doctrine).

Over the last 28 years of his life, Swedenborg wrote 18 published theological works—and several more that remained unpublished. He termed himself a "Servant of the Lord Jesus Christ" in True Christian Religion, which he published himself. Some followers of The Heavenly Doctrine believe that of his theological works, only those that were published by Swedenborg himself are fully divinely inspired. Others have regarded all Swedenborg's theological works as equally inspired, saying for example that the fact that some works were "not written out in a final edited form for publication does not make a single statement less trustworthy than the statements in any of the other works". The New Church, also known as Swedenborgianism, is a Restorationist denomination of Christianity originally founded in 1787 and comprising several historically related Christian churches that revere Swedenborg's writings as revelation.

== Early life ==
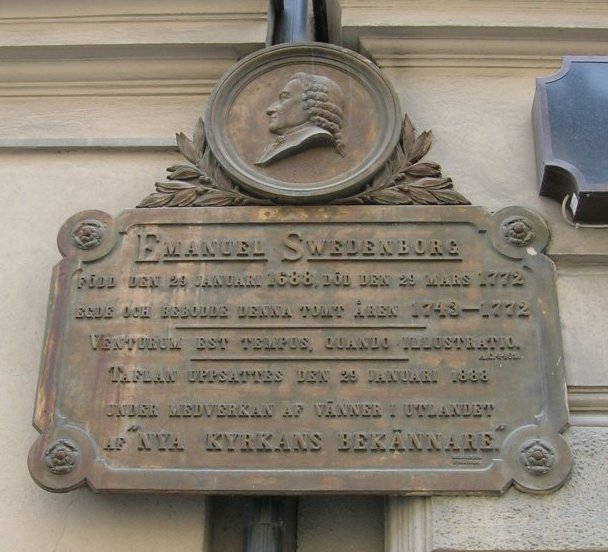
Memorial plaque at the former location of Swedenborg's house at Hornsgatan on Södermalm, Stockholm.

Swedenborg's father, Jesper Swedberg (1653–1735), descended from a wealthy mining family, bergsfrälse (early noble families in the mining sector), the Stjärna family, of the same patrilineal background as the noble family Stiernhielm, the earliest known patrilineal member being Olof Nilsson Stjärna of Stora Kopparberg. He travelled abroad and studied theology, and on returning home, he was eloquent enough to impress the Swedish king, Charles XI, with his sermons in Stockholm. Through the king's influence, he would later become professor of theology at Uppsala University and Bishop of Skara.

Jesper took an interest in the beliefs of the dissenting Lutheran Pietist movement, which emphasised the virtues of communion with God rather than relying on sheer faith (sola fide). Sola fide is a tenet of the Lutheran Church, and Jesper was charged with being a pietist heretic. While controversial, the beliefs were to have a major impact on his son Emanuel's spirituality. Jesper furthermore held the unconventional belief that angels and spirits were present in everyday life. This also came to have a strong impact on Emanuel.

In 1703–1709, aged 15–21, Emanuel Swedenborg lived in Erik Benzelius the Younger's house. He completed his university course at Uppsala in 1709, and in 1710, he made his grand tour through the Netherlands, France and Germany before reaching London, where he would spend the next four years. It was a flourishing centre of scientific ideas and discoveries. He studied physics, mechanics and philosophy and read and wrote poetry. According to the preface of a book by the Swedish critic Olof Lagercrantz, Swedenborg wrote to his benefactor and brother-in-law Benzelius that he believed he might be destined to be a great scientist.

== Early scientific work and spiritual reflections ==
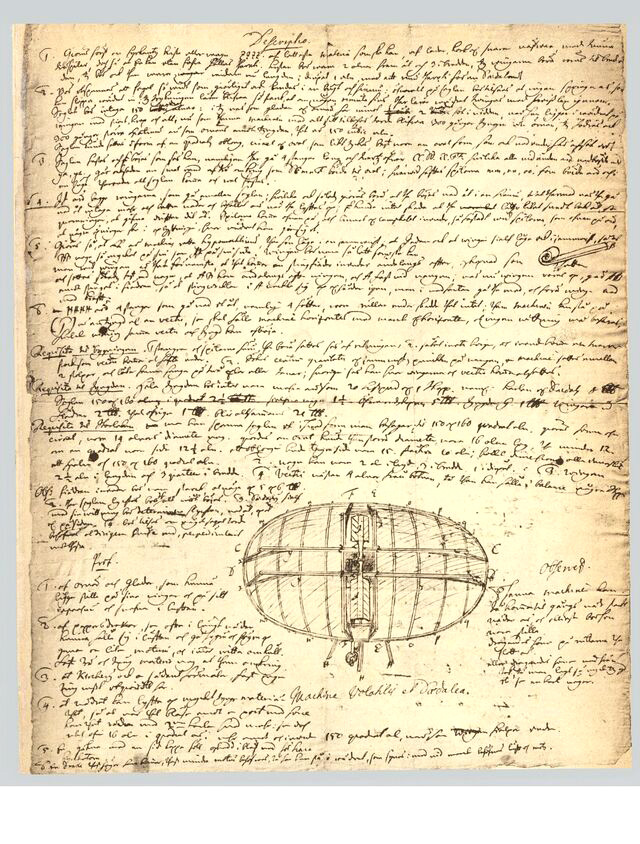
The Flying Machine, sketched in his notebook from 1714. The operator would sit in the middle and paddle himself through the air. p. 32, or on the video clip at 5:48 on its timeline.

In 1715, aged 27, Swedenborg returned to Sweden, where he devoted himself to natural science and engineering projects for the next two decades. A first step was his meeting with King Charles XII of Sweden in the city of Lund, in 1716. The Swedish inventor Christopher Polhem, who became a close friend of Swedenborg, was also present. Swedenborg's purpose was to persuade the king to fund an observatory in northern Sweden. However, the warlike king did not consider this project important enough, but did appoint Swedenborg to be assessor-extraordinary on the Swedish Board of Mines (Bergskollegium) in Stockholm.

From 1716 to 1718, aged 30, Swedenborg published a scientific periodical entitled Daedalus Hyperboreus ("The Northern Daedalus"), a record of mechanical and mathematical inventions and discoveries. One notable description was that of a flying machine, the same he had been sketching a few years earlier.

In 1718, Swedenborg published an article that attempted to explain spiritual and mental events in terms of minute vibrations, or "tremulations".

Upon the death of Charles XII, Queen Ulrika Eleonora ennobled Swedenborg and his siblings. It was common in Sweden during the 17th and 18th centuries for the children of bishops to receive that honour, as a recognition of the services of their father. The family name was changed from Swedberg to Swedenborg.

In 1724, he was offered the chair of mathematics at Uppsala University, but he declined and said that he had dealt mainly with geometry, chemistry and metallurgy during his career. He also said that he did not have the gift of eloquent speech because of a stutter, as recognized by many of his acquaintances; it forced him to speak slowly and carefully, and there are no known occurrences of his speaking in public. The Swedish critic Olof Lagerkrantz proposed that Swedenborg compensated for his impediment by extensive argumentation in writing.

== Scientific studies and spiritual reflections in the 1730s ==
During the 1730s, Swedenborg undertook many studies of anatomy and physiology. He had the first known anticipation of the neuron concept a century before the full significance of the nerve cell was realised. He also had prescient ideas about the cerebral cortex, the hierarchical organization of the nervous system, the localization of the cerebrospinal fluid, the functions of the pituitary gland, the perivascular spaces, the foramen of Magendie, the idea of somatotopic organization, and the association of frontal brain regions with the intellect. In some cases, his conclusions have been experimentally verified in modern times.

In the 1730s, Swedenborg became increasingly interested in spiritual matters and was determined to find a theory to explain how matter relates to spirit. Swedenborg's desire to understand the order and the purpose of creation first led him to investigate the structure of matter and the process of creation itself. In the Principia, the first part of his Opera Philosophica et Mineralia, he outlined his philosophical method, which incorporated experience, geometry (the means by which the inner order of the world can be known) and the power of reason. He also outlined his cosmology, which included the first presentation of his nebular hypothesis. (There is evidence that Swedenborg may have preceded Immanuel Kant by as much as 20 years in the development of that hypothesis.) Other inventions by Swedenborg include a submarine, an automatic weapon, a universal musical instrument, a system of sluices that could be used to transport boats across land and several types of water pumps, which were put into use when he was on Sweden's Board of Mines.

In 1735, in Leipzig, he published a three-volume work, Opera Philosophica et Mineralia (Philosophical and Mineralogical Works), in which he tried to conjoin philosophy and metallurgy. The work was mainly appreciated for its chapters on the analysis of the smelting of iron and copper, and it was the work that gave Swedenborg his international reputation. The same year, he also published the small manuscript De Infinito ("On the Infinite") in which he attempted to explain how the finite is related to the infinite and how the soul is connected to the body. It was the first manuscript in which he touched upon such matters. He knew that it might clash with established theologies since he presented the view that the soul is based on material substances. He also conducted dedicated studies of the fashionable philosophers of the time such as John Locke, Christian von Wolff, Gottfried Wilhelm Leibniz, and Descartes and earlier thinkers such as Plato, Aristotle, Plotinus and Augustine of Hippo.

Swedenborg was a critic of slavery. He was the first prominent Swede to condemn slavery.

In 1743, at the age of 55, Swedenborg requested a leave of absence to go abroad. His purpose was to gather source material for Regnum animale (The Animal Kingdom, or Kingdom of Life), a subject on which books were not readily available in Sweden. The aim of the book was to explain the soul from an anatomical point of view. He had planned to produce a total of 17 volumes.

== Journal of Dreams ==
By 1744, when he was 56, Swedenborg had travelled to the Netherlands. Around the time, he began having strange dreams. Swedenborg carried a travel journal with him on most of his travels and did so on this journey. The whereabouts of the diary were long unknown, but it was discovered in the Royal Library in the 1850s and was published in 1859 as Drömboken, or Journal of Dreams.

Swedenborg experienced many different dreams and visions, some greatly pleasurable, others highly disturbing. The experiences continued as he traveled to London to progress the publication of Regnum animale. This process, which one biographer has proposed as cathartic and comparable to the Catholic concept of Purgatory, continued for six months. He also proposed that what Swedenborg was recording in his Journal of Dreams was a battle between the love of himself and the love of God.

=== Visions and spiritual insights ===
In the last entry of the journal from 26 to 27 October 1744, Swedenborg appears to be clear as to which path to follow. He felt that he should drop his current project and write a new book about the worship of God. He soon began working on De cultu et amore Dei, or The Worship and Love of God. Swedenborg published the one and incomplete version in London in June 1745.

In 1745, aged 57, Swedenborg was dining in a private room at a tavern in London. By the end of the meal, a darkness fell upon his eyes, and the room shifted character. Suddenly, he saw a person sitting at a corner of the room, telling him: "Do not eat too much!". Swedenborg hurried home, greatly frightened. Later that night, the same man appeared in his dreams. The man told Swedenborg that he was the Lord, that he had appointed Swedenborg to reveal the spiritual meaning of the Bible and would guide Swedenborg in what to write. That same night the spiritual world opened to him.

== Scriptural commentary and writings ==
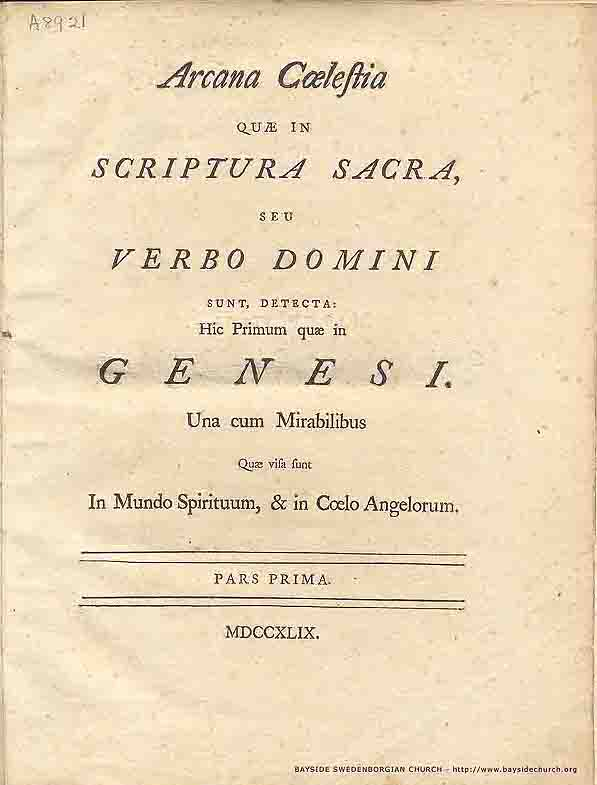
Arcana Cœlestia, first edition (1749), title page

In June 1747, Swedenborg resigned his post as assessor of the board of mines. He explained that he was obliged to complete a work that he had begun and requested to receive half his salary as a pension. He took up afresh his study of Hebrew and began to work on the spiritual interpretation of the Bible with the goal of interpreting the spiritual meaning of every verse. From sometime between 1746 and 1747 and for ten years, he devoted his energy to the task. Usually abbreviated as Arcana Cœlestia or under the Latin variant Arcana Caelestia (translated as Heavenly Arcana, Heavenly Mysteries, or Secrets of Heaven depending on modern English-language editions), the book became his magnum opus and the basis of his further theological works.

The work was anonymous, and Swedenborg was not identified as the author until the late 1750s. It had eight volumes, published between 1749 and 1756. It attracted little attention, as few people could penetrate its meaning.

His writings were filled with symbolism; Swedenborg often used stones to represent truth, snakes for evil, houses for intelligence, and cities for religious systems. He also described the appearance of heaven in great detail, as well as inhabitants from other planets.

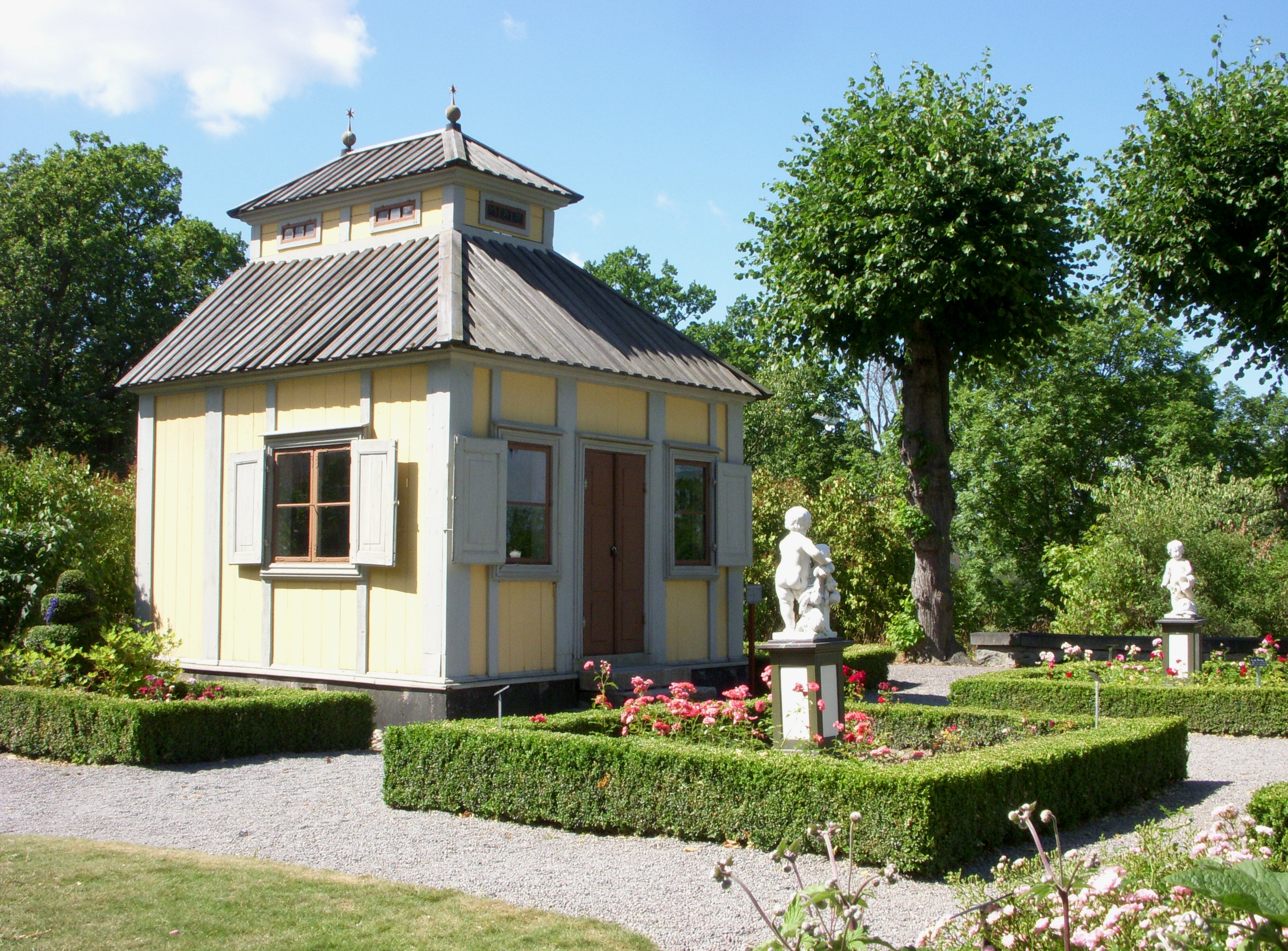
Emanuel Swedenborg's summer house now in Skansen which was transplanted from his Stockholm estate

His life from 1747 to his death was spent in Stockholm, the Netherlands, and London. During the 25 years, he wrote another 14 works of a spiritual nature; most were published during his lifetime.

One of Swedenborg's lesser-known works presents a startling claim: that the Last Judgment had begun in the previous year (1757) and was completed by the end of that year and that he had witnessed it. According to The Heavenly Doctrine, the Last Judgment took place not in the physical world but in the World of Spirits, halfway between heaven and hell, through which all pass on their way to heaven or hell. The Judgment took place because the Christian church had lost its charity and faith, resulting in a loss of spiritual free will that threatened the equilibrium between heaven and hell in everyone's life. (Note: For an extensive explanation of the inner spiritual sense of the book of the Apocalypse, see Swedenborg, E. The Apocalypse Revealed Wherein are Disclosed the Arcana Foretold Which Have Hitherto Remained Concealed (Swedenborg Foundation, 1928).)

The Heavenly Doctrine also teaches that the Last Judgment was followed by the Second Coming of Jesus Christ, which occurred not by Christ in person but by a revelation from him through the inner, spiritual sense of the Word through Swedenborg.

In another of his theological works, Swedenborg wrote that eating meat, regarded in itself, "is something profane" and was not practised in the early days of the human race. However, he said, it now is a matter of conscience, and no one is condemned for doing it. Nonetheless, the early-days ideal appears to have given rise to the idea that Swedenborg was a vegetarian. That conclusion may have been reinforced by the fact that a number of Swedenborg's early followers were part of the vegetarian movement that arose in Britain in the 19th century. However, the only reports on Swedenborg himself are contradictory. His landlord in London, Shearsmith, said he ate no meat, but his maid, who served Swedenborg, said that he ate eels and pigeon pie.

In Earths in the Universe, it is stated that he conversed with spirits from Jupiter, Mars, Mercury, Saturn, Venus and the Moon, as well as spirits from planets beyond the Solar System. From the "encounters", he concluded that the planets of the Solar System are inhabited and that such an enormous undertaking as the universe could not have been created for just one race on a planet or one "Heaven" derived from its properties per planet. Many Heavenly societies were also needed to increase the perfection of the angelic Heavens and Heaven to fill in deficiencies and gaps in other societies. He argued: "What would this be to God, Who is infinite, and to whom a thousand or tens of thousands of planets, and all of them full of inhabitants, would be scarcely anything!" Swedenborg and the question of life on other planets has been extensively reviewed elsewhere.

Swedenborg published his work in London or the Netherlands to escape censorship by the Swedish Empire.

In July 1770, at the age of 82, he travelled to Amsterdam to complete the publication of his last work. The book, Vera Christiana Religio (The True Christian Religion), was published there in 1771 and was one of the most appreciated of his works. Designed to explain his teachings to Lutherans, it is the most concrete of his works.

== Later life ==
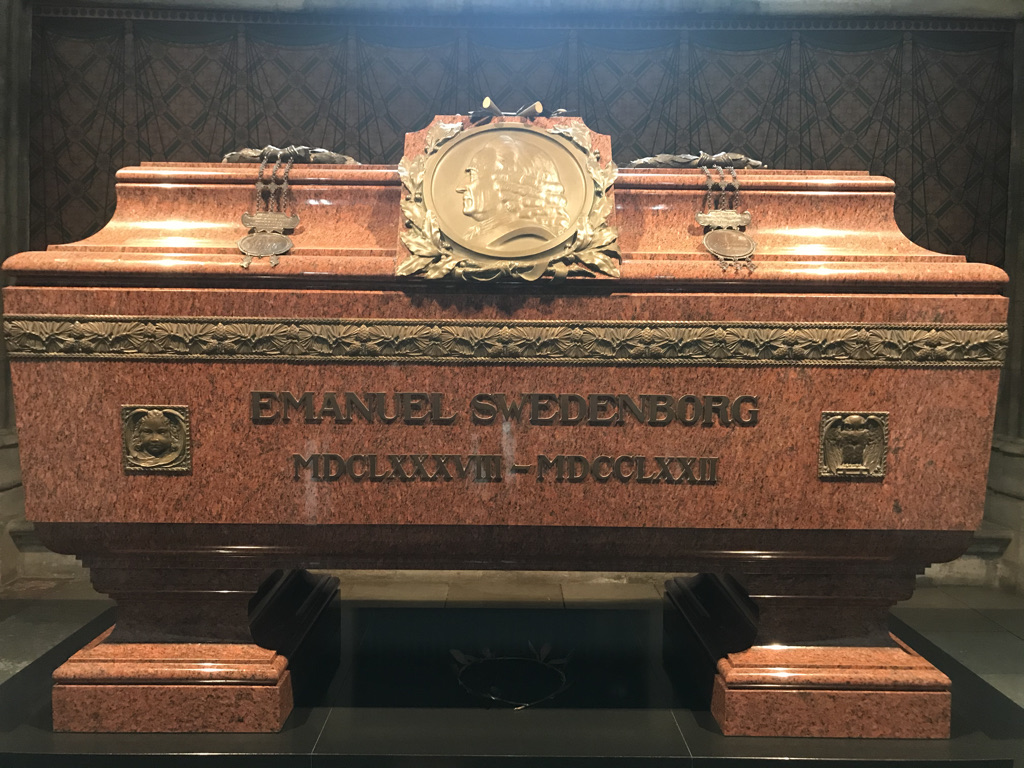
Swedenborg's crypt in Uppsala Cathedral

In the summer of 1771, he travelled to London. Shortly before Christmas, he had a stroke and was partially paralyzed and confined to bed. His health improved somewhat, but he died in 1772. There are several accounts of his last months, made by those with whom he stayed and by Arvid Ferelius, a pastor of the Swedish Church in London, who visited him several times.

There is evidence that Swedenborg wrote a letter to John Wesley, the founder of Methodism, in February. Swedenborg said that he had been told in the world of spirits that Wesley wanted to speak with him. Wesley, startled since he had not told anyone of his interest in Swedenborg, replied that he was going on a journey for six months and would contact Swedenborg on his return. Swedenborg replied that would be too late since Swedenborg would be going to the spiritual world for the last time on March 29. (Wesley later read and commented extensively on Swedenborg's work.) Swedenborg's landlord's servant girl, Elizabeth Reynolds, also said that Swedenborg had predicted the date and that he was as happy about it as if he was "going on holiday or to some merrymaking":

In Swedenborg's final hours, his friend, Pastor Ferelius, told him some people thought he had written his theology just to make a name for himself and asked Swedenborg if he would like to recant. Raising himself up on his bed, his hand on his heart, Swedenborg earnestly replied,

"As truly as you see me before your eyes, so true is everything that I have written; and I could have said more had it been permitted. When you enter eternity you will see everything, and then you and I shall have much to talk about."

He then died, in the afternoon, on the date he had predicted, March 29.

He was buried in the Swedish Church in Princes Square in Shadwell, London. On the 140th anniversary of his death, in 1912/1913, his remains were transferred to Uppsala Cathedral in Sweden, where they now rest close to the grave of the botanist Carl Linnaeus. In 1917, the Swedish Church in Shadwell was demolished, and the Swedish community that had grown around the parish moved to Marylebone. In 1938, Princes Square was redeveloped, and in his honour the local road was renamed Swedenborg Gardens. In 1997, a garden, play area and memorial, near the road, were created in his memory.

== Veracity ==
Swedenborg's transition from scientist to revelator or mystic has fascinated many people. He has had a variety of both supporting and critical biographers. Some propose that he did not have a revelation at all but developed his theological ideas from sources which ranged from his father to earlier figures in the history of thought, notably Plotinus. That position was first taken by Swedish writer Martin Lamm who wrote a biography of Swedenborg in 1915. (Note: The citation "Bergquist (1999)" is used here repeatedly but appears to contain mislabelled quotations. See the "Talk" section of this page under the heading "Bergquist footnote problem".) Swedish critic and publicist Olof Lagercrantz had a similar point of view, calling Swedenborg's theological writing "a poem about a foreign country with peculiar laws and customs".

Swedenborg's approach to proving the veracity of his theological teachings was to use voluminous quotations from the Old Testament and the New Testament to demonstrate agreement with the Bible, and this is found throughout his theological writings. A Swedish Royal Council considering heresy charges against two Swedish promoters of his theological writings concluded that "there is much that is true and useful in Swedenborg's writings". Victor Hugo suggested in passing, in Chapter 14 of Les Misérables, that Swedenborg, in company with Blaise Pascal, had "glided into insanity".

== Scientific beliefs ==
Swedenborg proposed many scientific ideas during his lifetime. In his youth, he wanted to present a new idea every day, as he wrote to his brother-in-law Erik Benzelius in 1718. Around 1730, he had changed his mind, and instead believed that higher knowledge is not something that can be acquired, but that it is based on intuition. After 1745, he instead considered himself receiving scientific knowledge in a spontaneous manner from angels.

From 1745, when he considered himself to have entered a spiritual state, he tended to phrase his "experiences" in empirical terms, to report accurately things he had experienced on his spiritual journeys.

One of his ideas that is considered most crucial for the understanding of his theology is his notion of correspondences. But, in fact, he first presented the theory of correspondences only in 1744, in the first volume of Regnum Animale dealing with the human soul.

The basis of the correspondence theory is that there is a relationship among the natural ("physical"), the spiritual, and the divine worlds. The spiritual realm was seen by Swedenborg and believers in the New Church as "more real than the physical" and as a series of divided "spheres" where souls are sent depending on the level of morality they achieved in the physical world or Earth. Souls navigate through the spiritual world and redeem themselves by travelling through it and reaching higher spheres, then encountering "divinity". The foundations of this theory can be traced to Neoplatonism and the philosopher Plotinus in particular. With the aid of this scenario, Swedenborg now interpreted the Bible in a different light, claiming that even the most apparently trivial sentences could hold a profound spiritual meaning. Swedenborg argued that it is the presence of that spiritual sense which makes the Word divine.

== Prophetic accounts ==
Four incidents of purported psychic ability of Swedenborg exist in the literature. There are several versions of each story.

=== Fire anecdotes ===
On Thursday, 19 July 1759 a great and well-documented fire broke out in Stockholm, Sweden. (Note: The accounts are fully described in Bergquist, pp. 312–313 and in Chapter 31 of The Swedenborg Epic. The primary source for these accounts is a letter from Immanuel Kant in 1768 and the Swedenborg collection by Tafel (see Further reading).) In the high and increasing wind it spread very fast, consuming about 300 houses and making 2000 people homeless.

When the fire broke out Swedenborg was at a dinner with friends in Gothenburg, about 400 km from Stockholm. He became agitated and told the party at six o'clock that there was a fire in Stockholm, that it had consumed his neighbour's home and was threatening his own. Two hours later, he exclaimed with relief that the fire had stopped three doors from his home. In the excitement following his report, word even reached the ears of the provincial governor, who summoned Swedenborg that same evening and asked for a detailed recounting.

At that time, it took two to three days for news from Stockholm to reach Gothenburg by courier, so that is the shortest duration in which the news of the fire could reach Gothenburg. The first messenger from Stockholm with news of the fire was from the Board of Trade, who arrived Monday evening. The second messenger was a royal courier, who arrived on Tuesday. Both of these reports confirmed every statement to the precise hour that Swedenborg first expressed the information. The accounts are fully described in Bergquist, pp. 312–313 and in Chapter 31 of The Swedenborg Epic. According to Swedenborg's biographer Lars Bergquist, however, this event took place on Sunday, 29 July – ten days after the fire.

(Bergquist states, but does not document, that Swedenborg confirmed his vision of the fire incident to his good friend, Consul Christopher Springer, "one of the pillars of the church, ... a man of enviable reputation for virtue and intelligence", and that Swedenborg's innkeeper, Erik Bergström, heard Swedenborg affirming the story.)

According to Swedenborg's followers, it seems unlikely that the many witnesses to Swedenborg's distress during the fire, and his immediate report of it to the provincial governor, would have left room for doubt in the public eye of Swedenborg's report. They further contend that if Swedenborg had only received news of the fire by the normal methods there would have been no issue of psychic perception recorded for history. Instead, "when the news of Swedenborg's extraordinary vision of the fire reached the capital, public curiosity about him was very much aroused."

A second fire anecdote, similar to the first one, but less cited, is the incident of the mill owner Bolander. Swedenborg warned him, again abruptly, of an incipient fire in one of his mills.

=== Queen of Sweden ===
The third event was in 1758 when Swedenborg visited Queen Louisa Ulrika of Sweden, who asked him to tell her something about her deceased brother Prince Augustus William of Prussia. The next day, Swedenborg whispered something in her ear that turned the Queen pale and she explained that this was something only she and her brother could know about. (Note: According to Bergquist (1999), pp. 314–315, There are several different accounts of the events which makes it difficult to conclude the exact details of the event. Carl Robsahm (see reference) reports the story in this way.)

=== Lost document ===
The fourth incident involved a woman who had lost an important document, and came to Swedenborg asking if a recently deceased person could tell him where it was, which he (in some sources) was said to have done the following night. (Note: According to Bergquist (1999), p. 316, there are some ten different reports of this event. There are two trustworthy descriptions, one by Robsahm (writing down Swedenborg's own description) and one by a priest who enquired of the woman in a letter fifteen years later.)

=== Sailing conditions ===
Although not typically cited along with these four episodes, there was one further piece of evidence: Swedenborg was noted by the seamen of the ships that he sailed between Stockholm and London to always have excellent sailing conditions. When asked about this by a friend, Swedenborg played down the matter, saying he was surprised by this experience himself and that he was certainly not able to do miracles.

== Kant's view ==
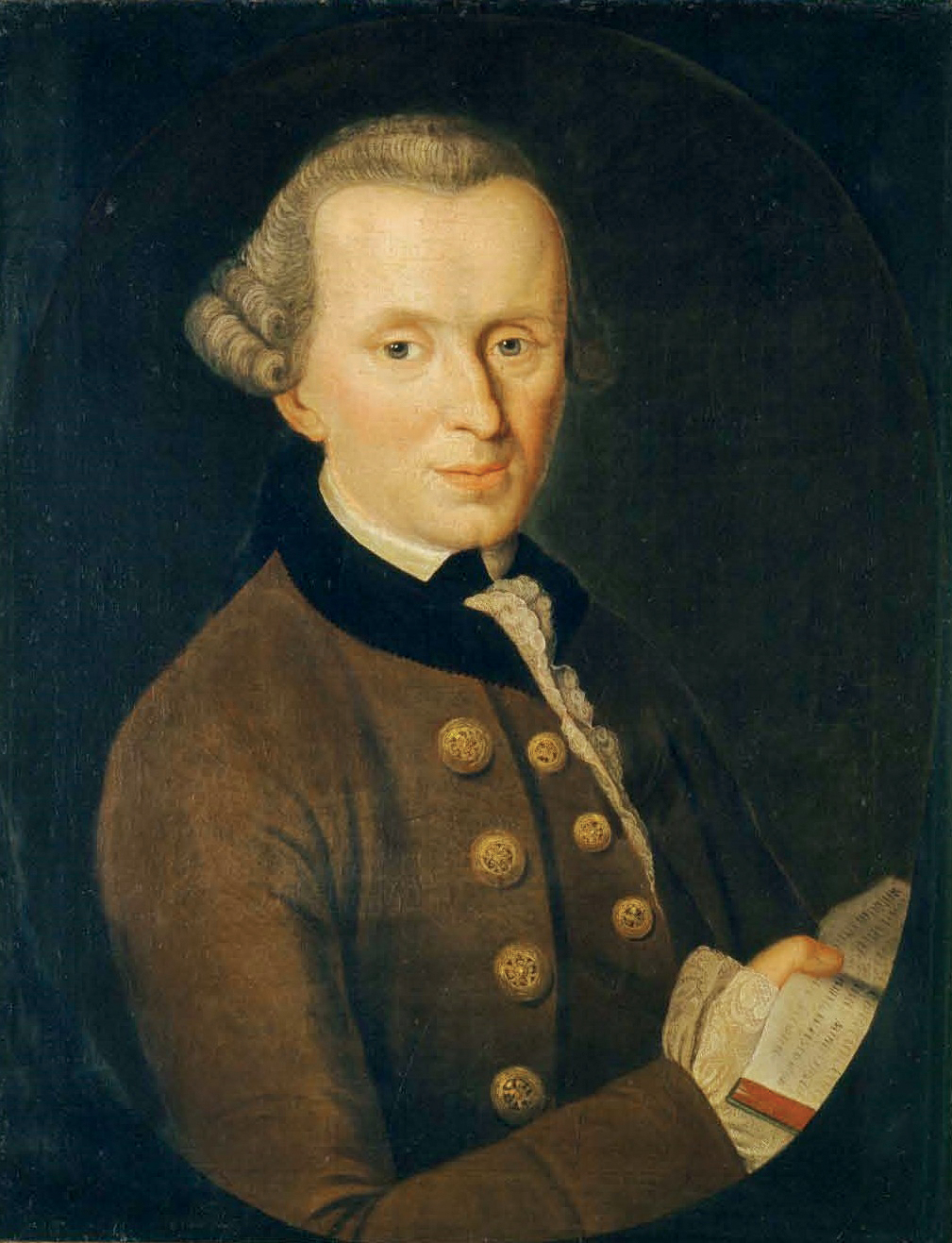
Immanuel Kant wrote Dreams of a Spirit-Seer, a methodical investigation of Swedenborg's claims.

In 1763, Immanuel Kant, then at the beginning of his career, was impressed by accounts of Swedenborg's psychic abilities and made inquiries to find out if they were true. He also ordered all eight volumes of the expensive Arcana Cœlestia (Heavenly Arcana or Heavenly Mysteries). One Charlotte von Knobloch wrote to Kant asking his opinion of Swedenborg's psychic experiences. (Note: This letter is further discussed in Laywine, A., "Kant's Early Metaphysics". North American Kant Society Studies in Philosophy, volume 3 (Atascadero, California: Ridgeview Publishing Company, 1993), pp. 72–74.) Kant wrote a very affirmative reply, referring to Swedenborg's "miraculous" gift, and characterizing him as "reasonable, agreeable, remarkable and sincere" and "a scholar", in one of his letters to Moses Mendelssohn, and expressing regret that he (Kant) had never met Swedenborg. Joseph Green, his English friend, who investigated the matter for Kant, including by visiting Swedenborg's home, found Swedenborg to be a "sensible, pleasant and openhearted" man and here again, a scholar.

However, three years later, in 1766, Kant wrote and published anonymously a small book entitled Träume eines Geistersehers (Dreams of a Spirit-Seer) that was a scathing critique of Swedenborg and his writings. He termed Swedenborg a "spook hunter" "without official office or occupation". As rationale for his critique, Kant said he wanted to stop "ceaseless questioning" and inquiries about Dreams from "inquisitive" persons, both known and unknown. Kant's friend Moses Mendelssohn thought there was a "joking pensiveness" in Dreams that sometimes left the reader in doubt as to whether Dreams was meant to make "metaphysics laughable or spirit-seeking credible". In one of his letters to Mendelssohn, Kant refers to Dreams less-than-enthusiastically as a "desultory little essay".

== Theology ==
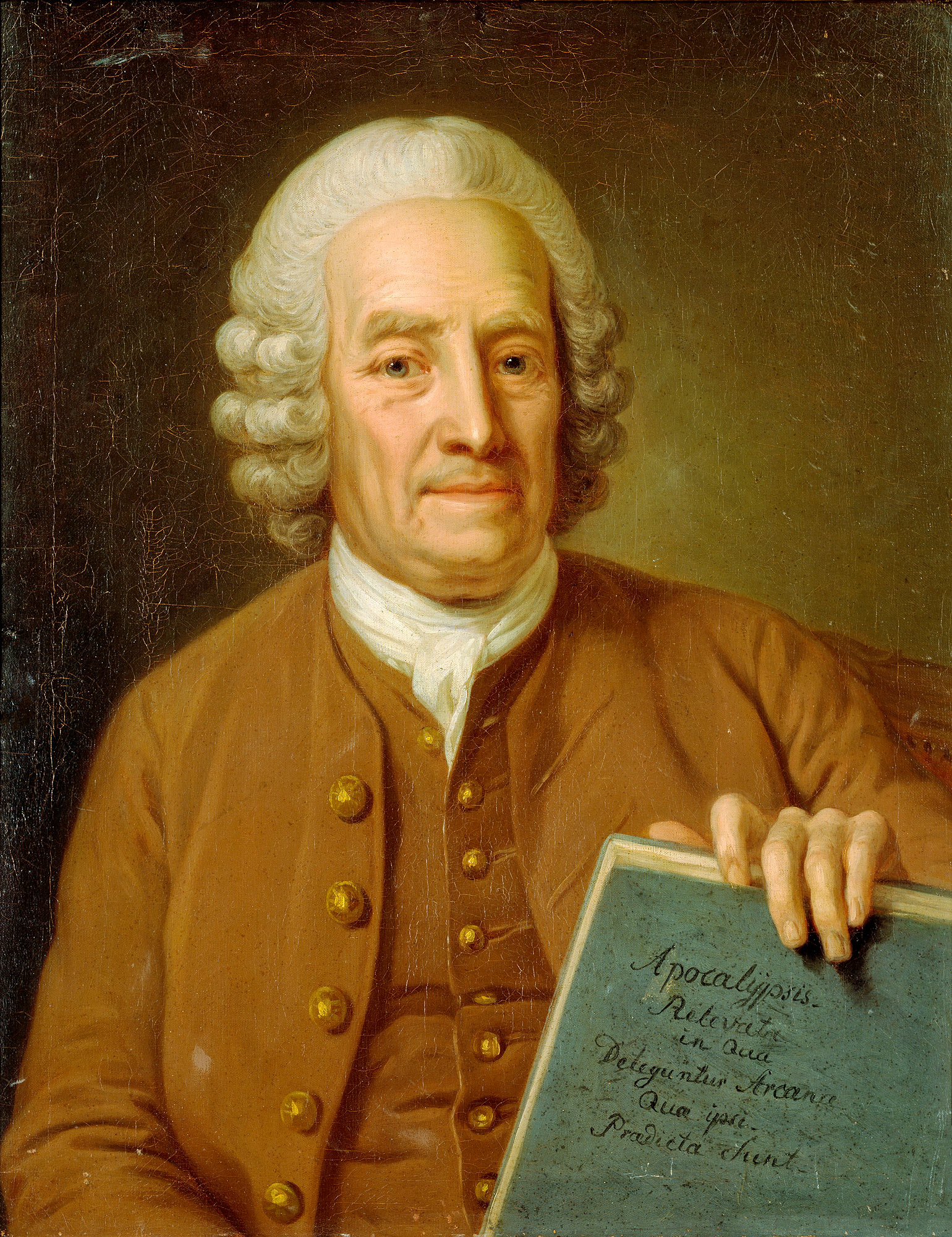
Swedenborg at the age of 75, holding the soon to be published manuscript of Apocalypse Revealed (1766)

Swedenborg claimed in The Heavenly Doctrine that the teachings of the Second Coming of Jesus Christ were revealed to him.

Swedenborg considered his theology a revelation of the true Christian religion that had become obfuscated through centuries of theology. However, he did not refer to his writings as theology since he considered it based on actual experiences, unlike theology, except in the title of his last work. Neither did he wish to compare it to philosophy, a discipline he discarded in 1748 because, he claimed, it "darkens the mind, blinds us, and wholly rejects the faith".

The foundation of Swedenborg's theology was laid down in Arcana Cœlestia (Heavenly Mysteries), published in eight Latin volumes from 1749 to 1756. In a significant portion of that work, he interprets the Biblical passages of Genesis and Exodus. He reviews what he says is the inner spiritual sense of these two works of the Word of God. (He later made a similar review of the inner sense of the book of Revelation in Apocalypse Revealed.) Most of all, he was convinced that the Bible describes a human's transformation from a materialistic to a spiritual being, which he calls rebirth or regeneration. He begins this work by outlining how the creation myth was not an account of the creation of Earth, but an account of man's rebirth or regeneration in six steps represented by the six days of creation. Everything related to mankind in the Bible could also be related to Jesus Christ, and how Christ freed himself from materialistic boundaries through the glorification of his human presence by making it Divine. Swedenborg examines this idea in his exposition of Genesis and Exodus.

=== Marriage ===
One often discussed aspect of Swedenborg's writing is his ideas on marriage. Swedenborg himself remained a bachelor all his life, but that did not hinder him from writing voluminously on the subject. His work on Marriage Love (Conjugial Love (Note: "conjugial" should not be confused with "conjugal", the general term for marriage.) in older translations; 1768) was dedicated to this purpose.

A central question with regard to marriage is whether it stops at death or continues into heaven. The question arises due to a statement attributed to Jesus that there is no marriage in heaven (Luke 20:27–38, Matthew 22:23–32, and Mark 12:18–27). Swedenborg wrote The Lord God Jesus Christ on Marriage in Heaven as a detailed analysis of what he meant.

The quality of the relationship between husband and wife resumes in the spiritual world in whatever state it was at their death in this world. Thus, a couple in true marriage love remain together in that state in heaven into eternity. A couple lacking in that love by one or both partners, however, will separate after death and each will be given a compatible new partner if they wish. A partner is also given to a person who loved the ideal of marriage but never found a true partner in this world. The exception in both cases is a person who hates chaste marriage and thus cannot receive such a partner.

Swedenborg saw creation as a series of pairings, descending from the Divine love and wisdom that define God and are the basis of creation. This duality can be seen in the pairing of good and truth, charity and faith, God and the church, and husband and wife. In each case, the goal for these pairs is to achieve conjunction between the two component parts. In the case of marriage, the object is to bring about the joining of the two partners at the spiritual and physical levels, and the happiness that comes as a consequence.

=== Trinity ===
Swedenborg rejected the common explanation of the Trinity as a Trinity of Persons, which he said was not taught in the early Christian church, as there was, for instance, no mention in the Apostolic writings of any "Son from eternity". Instead he explained in his theological writings how the Divine Trinity exists in One Person, in One God, the Lord Jesus Christ, which he said is taught in Colossians 2:9. According to The Heavenly Doctrine, Jesus, the Son of God, came into the world because of the spread of evil here.

Swedenborg spoke in virtually all his works against what he regarded as the incomprehensible Trinity of Persons concept. He said that people of other religions opposed Christianity because of its doctrine of a Trinity of Persons. He considered the separation of the Trinity into three separate Persons to have originated with the First Council of Nicaea and the Athanasian Creed.

=== Sola Fide (Faith Alone) ===
The Heavenly Doctrine rejects the concept of salvation through faith alone (Latin: sola fide), since he considered both faith and charity necessary for salvation, not one without the other, whereas the Reformers taught that faith alone procured justification, although it must be a faith which resulted in obedience. The purpose of faith, according to The Heavenly Doctrine, is to lead a person to a life according to the truths of faith, which is charity, as is taught in 1 Corinthians 13:13 and James 2:20.

In other words, Swedenborg spoke sharply against the sola fide doctrine of Luther and others. He held that justification before God was not based solely upon some imputed righteousness before God, and was not achievable merely by a gift of God's grace (Latin: sola gratia, lit. 'by grace alone'), granted without any basis in a person's actual behavior in life. Sola fide was a doctrine averred by Martin Luther, John Calvin, Ulrich Zwingli and others during the Protestant Reformation, and was a core belief especially in the theology of the Lutheran reformers Martin Luther and Philip Melanchthon.

Although the sola fide doctrine of the Reformers also emphasized that saving faith was one that effected works (by faith alone, but not by a faith which is alone), Swedenborg protested against sola fide being the instrument of justification, and held that salvation is only possible through the conjunction of faith and charity in a person, and that the purpose of faith is to lead a person to live according to the truths of faith, which is charity. He further states that faith and charity must be exercised by doing good out of willing good whenever possible, which are good works or good uses or the conjunction perishes. In one section he wrote:

It is very evident from their Epistles that it never entered the mind of any of the apostles that the church of this day would separate faith from charity by teaching that faith alone justifies and saves apart from the works of the law, and that charity therefore cannot be conjoined with faith, since faith is from God, and charity, so far as it is expressed in works, is from man. But this separation and division were introduced into the Christian church when it divided God into three persons, and ascribed to each equal Divinity.

— True Christian Religion, section 355

== Later history ==
Wayfarers Chapel, located in Rancho Palos Verdes, California, is one of the gathering places where believers fellowship.

Swedenborg made no attempt to found a church. Circa 1787, some 15 years after his death, small reading groups were formed, mostly in England, to study his teachings. As one scholar states, The Heavenly Doctrine particularly appealed to the various dissenting groups that sprang up in the first half of the 18th century who were "surfeited with revivalism and narrow-mindedness" and found his optimism and comprehensive explanations appealing.

A variety of important cultural figures, both writers and artists, were influenced by Swedenborg's writings, including Johnny Appleseed, William Blake, Jorge Luis Borges, Daniel Burnham, Charles Baudelaire, Arthur Conan Doyle, Ralph Waldo Emerson, John Flaxman, Robert Frost, George Inness, Henry James Sr., Carl Jung, Immanuel Kant, Honoré de Balzac, Helen Keller, Czesław Miłosz, August Strindberg, D. T. Suzuki, W. B. Yeats, Tomislav Vlašić, and Mother Teresa. Some have suggested Joseph Smith was influenced by Swedenborg in his 1832 Vision of the Degrees of Glory, although there is little evidence that Smith was aware of Swedenborg's writings before 1839. Swedenborg's philosophy had a great impact on the Duke of Södermanland, later King Carl XIII, who as the Grand Master of Swedish Freemasonry (Svenska Frimurare Orden) built its unique system of degrees and wrote its rituals. In contrast, one of the most prominent Swedish authors of Swedenborg's day, Johan Henric Kellgren, called Swedenborg "nothing but a fool". (Note: Johan Henrik Kellgren published an often quoted satirical poem entitled Man äger ej snille för det man är galen ("You Own Not Genius For That You are Mad") in 1787. See Jonsson, Inge, Swedenborg och Linné, in Delblanc & Lönnroth (1999). (Link to the full poem, in Swedish)) A heresy trial was initiated in Sweden in 1768 against Swedenborg writings and two men who promoted them. (Note: The trial in 1768 was against Gabrial Beyer and Johan Rosén and was essentially concerned whether Swedenborg's theological writings were consistent with Christian doctrine. A royal ordinance in 1770 declared that writings were "clearly mistaken" and should not be taught. Swedenborg then begged the King for grace and protection in a letter from Amsterdam. A new investigation against Swedenborg stalled and was eventually dropped in 1778.)

In the two and a half centuries since Swedenborg's death, various interpretations of his theology have been made, and he has also been scrutinized in biographies and psychological studies. (Note: See "Sources" and "Further reading" sections, below.) Swedenborg, with his claimed new dispensation, has been considered by some to have a mental illness. (Note: This subject is touched on in the preface of Bergquist (1999), who mentions the biography by Martin Lamm (originally published in 1917) and its focus on the similarities of Swedenborg's scientific and theological lives. He mentions an earlier biography by the Swedish physician Emil Kleen who concluded that Swedenborg was blatantly mad, suffering "paranoia and hallucinations. A similar conclusion was proposed more recently by psychiatrist John Johnson in "Henry Maudsley on Swedenborg's messianic psychosis", British Journal of Psychiatry 165:690–691 (1994), who wrote that Swedenborg had hallucinations of "acute schizophrenia or epileptic psychosis". Another contemporary critique, Foote-Smith E, Smith TJ. Emanuel Swedenborg. Epilepsia 1996 Feb; 37(2):211-8, proposed that Swedenborg had had Temporal Lobe Epilepsy. For a detailed review of these two articles, see the special issue of the academic journal The New Philosophy The Madness Hypothesis.)) While the insanity explanation was not uncommon during Swedenborg's own time, it is mitigated by his activity in the Swedish Riddarhuset (the House of the Nobility), the Riksdag (the Swedish parliament), and the Royal Swedish Academy of Sciences. Additionally, the system of thought in his theological writings is considered by some to be remarkably coherent. Furthermore, he was characterized by his contemporaries as a "kind and warm-hearted man", "amiable in his meeting with the public", speaking "easily and naturally of his spiritual experiences", with pleasant and interesting conversation. An English friend of Kant's who visited Swedenborg at Kant's behest described Swedenborg as a "reasonable, pleasant and candid man and scholar". Of note here is Swedenborg's statement that he was commanded by the Lord to publish his writings and "Do not believe that without this express command I would have thought of publishing things which I knew in advance would make me look ridiculous and many people would think lies".

== In popular culture ==
The song The Dreams of Swedenborg, from symphonic metal band Therion's 2004 album Lemuria, talks about Swedenborg's revelations.

Swedenborg and his spiritual philosophy are prominently featured in the 1835 Honoré de Balzac novel, Seraphita.

Swedenborg's book Heaven and its Wonders and Hell From Things Heard and Seen is a major contributor to the plot of the movie Things Heard & Seen, which premiered on Netflix in 2021.

In Olga Tokarczuk's 2018 novel Drive Your Plow Over the Bones of the Dead, the main character, Janina Duszejko, makes a reference to Swedenborg's work in astrology.

In Jorge Luis Borges's short prose piece A Theologian in Death (Un teólogo en la muerte), included in A Universal History of Infamy, Borges attributes the story to Swedenborg's Arcana Cœlestia. Literary scholar Livia Grotto identifies this attribution as false, tracing the story instead to §47 of Swedenborg's 1763 Continuation Concerning the Last Judgment and §797 of his 1771 True Christian Religion.

In James Joyce's novel A Portrait of the Artist as a Young Man, the protagonist Stephen Dedalus, while watching a flock of birds from the steps of the National Library, experiences "shapeless thoughts from Swedenborg on the correspondence of birds to things of the intellect and of how the creatures of the air have their knowledge and know their times and seasons because they, unlike man, are in the order of their life and have not perverted that order by reason."

== Posthumous honours ==
The mineral swedenborgite, discovered in Långban, Sweden in 1924, is named in his honor.

=== UNESCO Memory of the World Register ===
In 2005, the extensive collection of manuscripts by Emanuel Swedenborg was officially inscribed in the UNESCO Memory of the World International Register, a distinction reserved for documentary heritage of outstanding universal value to humanity. This recognition followed a submission by Sweden in 2004. The archive, preserved by the Royal Swedish Academy of Sciences (Kungliga Vetenskapsakademien) since 1772, comprises approximately 20,000 pages of original autograph manuscripts, making it one of the largest and most complete 18th-century manuscript collections preserved in its entirety.

The collection is one of only six Swedish entries in the international register, alongside the archives of Astrid Lindgren, Ingmar Bergman, and Alfred Nobel, as well as the Codex Argenteus (the "Silver Bible") and historical architectural drawings of Stockholm.

== Works ==
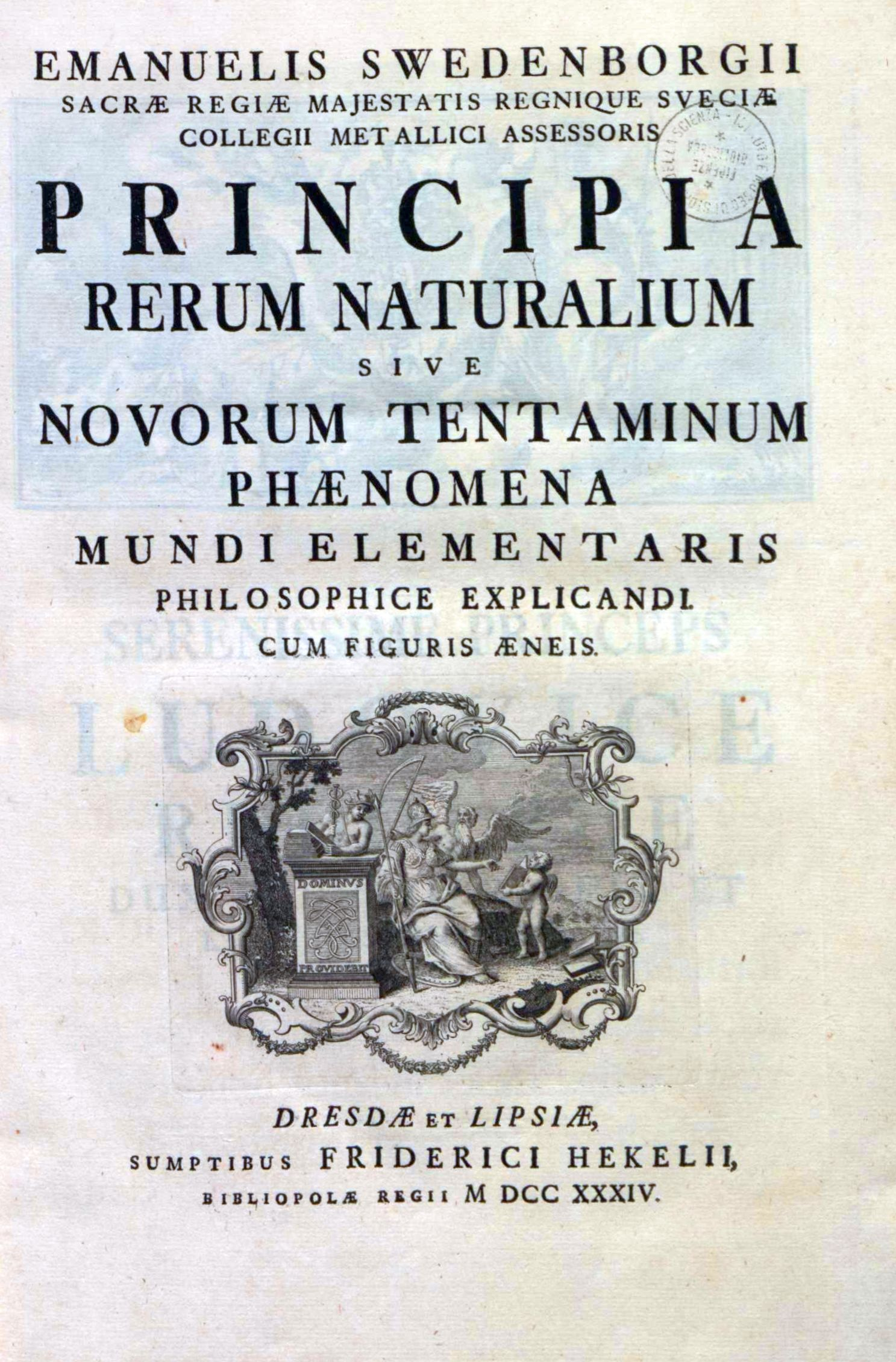
Principia rerum naturalium, 1734

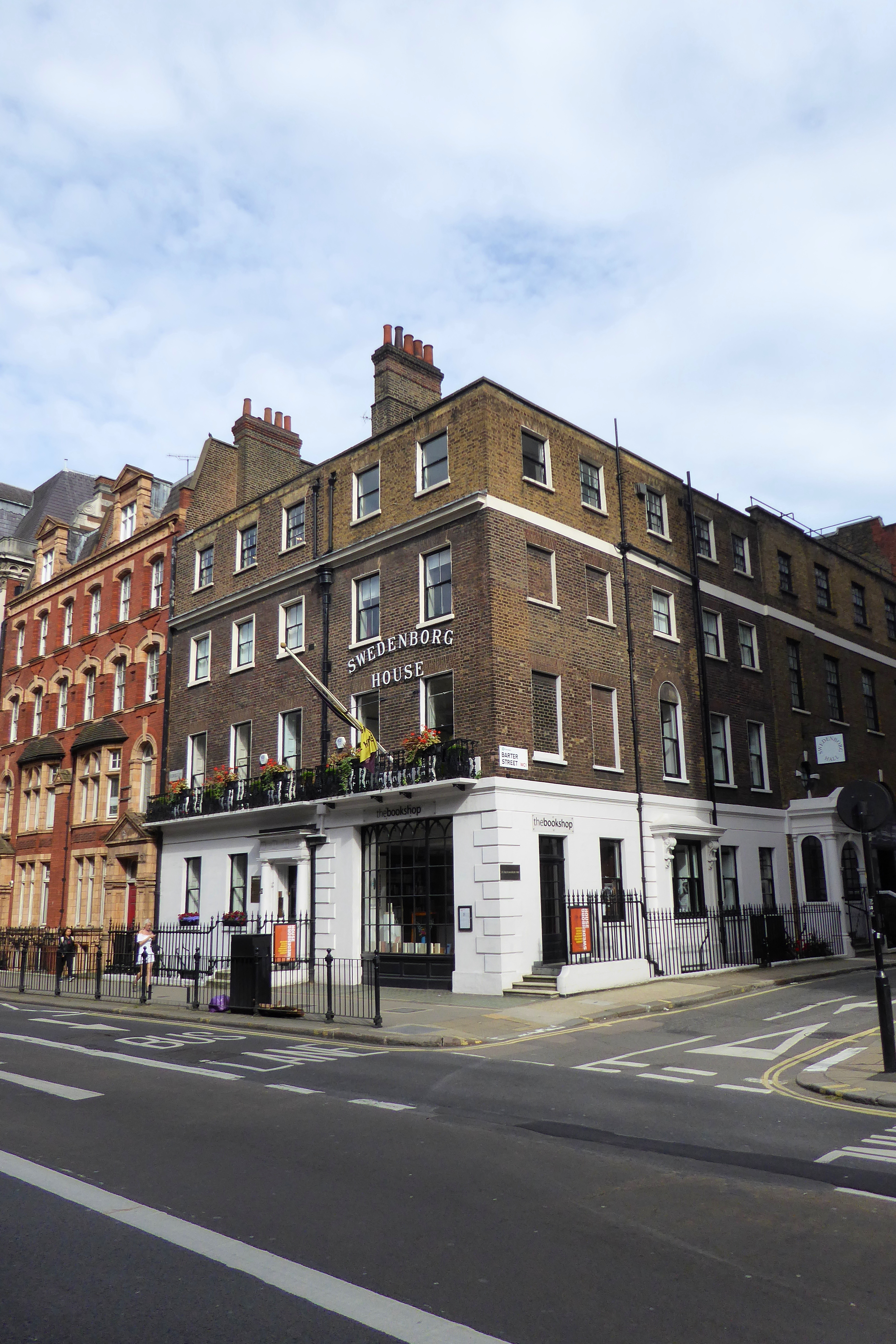
Swedenborg House, a publishing house in London of works by Swedenborg

Copies of the original Latin version in which Swedenborg wrote his revelation are available from the following sources.

The common names used in a New Church listing are given parenthetically, followed by the titles in the original. All the titles listed were published by Swedenborg except The Spiritual Diary. Various minor reports and tracts have been omitted from the list.

- 1716–1718, (Daedalus Hyperboreus, The Northern Inventor, or Some New Experiments in Mathematics and Physics) Swedish: Daedalus Hyperboreus, eller några nya mathematiska och physicaliska försök
- 1721, (Principles of Chemistry) Latin: Prodromus principiorum rerum naturalium: sive novorum tentaminum chymiam et physicam experimenta geometrice explicandi
- 1722, (Miscellaneous Observations) Latin: Miscellanea de Rebus Naturalibus
- 1734, (Philosophical and Mineralogical Works) Latin: Opera Philosophica et Mineralia, three volumes
  - (Principia, Volume I) Latin: Tomus I. Principia rerum naturlium sive novorum tentaminum phaenomena mundi elementaris philosophice explicandi
  - (Principia, Volume II) Latin: Tomus II. Regnum subterraneum sive minerale de ferro
  - (Principia, Volume III) Latin: Tomus III. Regnum subterraneum sive minerale de cupro et orichalco
- 1734, (The Infinite and Final Cause of Creation) Latin: Prodromus Philosophiz Ratiocinantis de Infinito, et Causa Finali Creationis; deque Mechanismo Operationis Animae et Corporis.
- Principia rerum naturalium (in Latin). Leipzig: Friedrich Heckel. 1734.
- 1742, (The Soul, or Rational Psychology)
- 1744–1745, (The Animal Kingdom) Latin: Regnum animale, 3 volumes
- 1745, (The Worship and Love of God) Latin: De Cultu et Amore Dei, 2 volumes
- 1749–1756, (Heavenly Mysteries) Latin: Arcana Cœlestia, quae in Scriptura Sacra seu Verbo Domini sunt, detecta, 8 volumes
- 1758, (Heaven and Hell) Latin: De Caelo et Ejus Mirabilibus et de inferno. Ex Auditis et Visis.
- 1758, (The Last Judgment) Latin: De Ultimo Judicio
- 1758, (The White Horse) Latin: De Equo Albo de quo in Apocalypsi Cap. XIX.
- 1758, (Earths in the Universe) Latin: De Telluribus in Mundo Nostro Solari, quæ vocantur planetæ: et de telluribus in coelo astrifero: deque illarum incolis; tum de spiritibus & angelis ibi; ex auditis & visis – English translation
- 1758, (The New Jerusalem and Its Heavenly Doctrine) Latin: De Nova Hierosolyma et Ejus Doctrina Coelesti
- 1763, (Doctrine of the Lord) Latin: Doctrina Novæ Hierosolymæ de Domino.
- 1763, (Doctrine of the Sacred Scripture) Latin: Doctrina Novæ Hierosolymæ de Scriptura Sacra.
- 1763, (Doctrine of Life) Latin: Doctrina Vitæ pro Nova Hierosolyma ex præceptis Decalogi.
- 1763, (Doctrine of Faith) Latin: Doctrina Novæ Hierosolymæ de Fide.
- 1763, (Continuation of The Last Judgement) Latin: Continuatio De Ultimo Judicio: et de mundo spirituali.
- 1763, (Divine Love and Wisdom) Latin: Sapientia Angelica de Divino Amore et de Divina Sapientia. Sapientia Angelica de Divina Providentia.
- 1764, (Divine Providence) Latin: Sapientia Angelica de Divina Providentia.
- 1766, (Apocalypse Revealed) Latin: Apocalypsis Revelata, in quae detegunter Arcana quae ibi preedicta sunt.
- 1768, (Conjugial Love, or Marriage Love) Latin: Deliciae Sapientiae de Amore Conjugiali; post quas sequumtur voluptates insaniae de amore scortatorio.
- 1769, (Brief Exposition) Latin: Summaria Expositio Doctrinæ Novæ Ecclesiæ, quæ per Novam Hierosolymam in Apocalypsi intelligitur.
- 1769, (Interaction of the Soul and the Body) Latin: De Commercio Animæ & Corporis.
- 1771, (True Christian Religion) Latin: Vera Christiana Religio, continens Universam Theologiam Novae Ecclesiae
- 1859, (Journal of Dreams) Drömboken: journalanteckningar, 1743–1744
- Geologica et epistolae (in Latin). Stockholm: Officina Aftonbladet. 1907.
- Cosmologica (in Latin). Stockholm: Officina Aftonbladet. 1908.
- Miscellanea de rebus naturalibus (in Latin). Stockholm: Officina Aftonbladet. 1911.
- 1983–1997, (Spiritual Diary) Latin: Diarum, Ubi Memorantur Experientiae Spirituales.

== See also ==
- List of Christian thinkers in science
- Lord's New Church Which Is Nova Hierosolyma
- The New Church (Swedenborgian)
- General Church of the New Jerusalem
- Swedenborgian Church of North America
- Swedenborg Rite
- Wayfarers Chapel
- Daniil Andreyev
- Swedenborg Society

== Sources ==
- Ahlstrom, S.E. A Religious History of the American People (Yale 1972) Includes section on Swedenborg by this scholar.
- Benz, Ernst, Emanuel Swedenborg: Visionary Savant in the Age of Reason (Swedenborg Foundation, 2002) ISBN 0-87785-195-6, a translation of the thorough German language study on life and work of Swedenborg, Emanuel Swedenborg: Naturforscher und Seher by the noted religious scholar Ernst Benz, published in Munich in 1948.
- Bergquist, Lars, Swedenborg's Secret (London, The Swedenborg Society, 2005) ISBN 0-85448-143-5, a translation of the Swedish language biography of Swedenborg, Swedenborgs Hemlighet, published in Stockholm in 1999. ISBN 91-27-06981-8
- Block, M. B. The New Church in the New World. A study of Swedenborgianism in America (Holt 1932; Octagon reprint 1968) A detailed history of the ideational and social development of the organized churches based on Swedenborg's works.
- Crompton, S. Emanuel Swedenborg (Chelsea House, 2005) Recent biography of Swedenborg.
- Johnson, G., ed. Kant on Swedenborg. Dreams of a Spirit-Seer and Other Writings. Translation by Johnson, G., Magee, G.E. (Swedenborg Foundation 2002) New translation and extensive set of supplementary texts.
- Lamm, Martin, Swedenborg: En studie (1987; first ed. 1915). A popular biography that is still read and quoted. It is also available in English: Emanuel Swedenborg: The Development of His Thought, Martin Lamm (Swedenborg Studies, No. 9, 2001), ISBN 0-87785-194-8
- Lagercrantz, Olof, Dikten om livet på den andra sidan (Wahlström & Widstrand 1996), ISBN 91-46-16932-6. In Swedish.
- Leon, James, Overcoming Objections to Swedenborg's Writings Through the Development of Scientific Dualism An examination of Swedenborg's discoveries. The author is a professor of psychology (1998; published in New Philosophy, 2001)
- Moody, R. A. Life after Life (Bantam 1975) Reports correlation of near-death experience with Swedenborg's reports of life after death.
- Price, R. Johnny Appleseed. Man and Myth (Indiana 1954) Definitive study of this legendary man. Includes details of his interest in Swedenborg and the organizational New Church
- Robsahm, Carl, Hallengren, Anders (translation and comments), Anteckningar om Swedenborg (Föreningen Swedenborgs Minne: Stockholm 1989), ISBN 91-87856-00-X. Hallengren writes that the first complete publication of the Robsam manuscript was in R. L. Tafel's Documents, Vol. I, 1875 (see section "Further reading")
- Schuchard, Marsha Keith. 2011. Emanuel Swedenborg, Secret Agent on Earth and in Heaven: Jacobites, Jews and Freemasons in Early Modern Sweden. Brill.
- Sigstedt, C.,The Swedenborg Epic. The Life and Works of Emanuel Swedenborg (New York: Bookman Associates, 1952). The whole book is available online at Swedenborg Digital Library.
- Toksvig, Signe (1948). Emanuel Swedenborg, Scientist and Mystic . New Haven: Yale University Press. ISBN 0-87785-171-9 – via Wikisource.
