= Paul Rozin =

American psychologist

- Born: August 3, 1936 (age 90)
- Education: University of Chicago
- Known for: Social psychology (Social influence, conformity), Asch conformity experiments
- Scientific career
- Fields: Psychology, Psychotherapy, Psychopathology
- Academic advisors: Jean Mayer

Paul Rozin (born August 3, 1936) is a professor of psychology at the University of Pennsylvania. He teaches two Benjamin Franklin Scholars (BFS) honors courses and graduate level seminars. He is also a faculty member in the Master of Applied Positive Psychology program started by Martin Seligman. He is described as the world's leading expert on disgust. His work focuses on the psychological, cultural, and biological determinants of human food choice.

Rozin earned a bachelor's degree from the University of Chicago in 1956, and doctoral degrees in biology and psychology from Harvard University in 1961. In 1963, he joined the psychology department at the University of Pennsylvania, where in 1997 he was named the Edmund J. and Louise W. Kahn Professor. In 2016, he was awarded a Senior Fellowship of the Zukunftskollegs at the University of Konstanz. He also served as co-director of the school's Solomon Asch Center for the Study of Ethnopolitical Conflict (which has now moved to Bryn Mawr College).

His teaching and research interests include: acquisition of likes and dislikes for foods, nature and development of the magical belief in contagion, cultural evolution of disgust, ambivalence to animal foods, lay conception of risk of infection and toxic effects of foods, interaction of moral and health factors in concerns about risks, relation between people's desires to have desires and their actual desires (including the problem of internalization), acquisition of culture, nature of cuisine and cultural evolution, and psychological responses to recycled water.

== Benign masochism ==
Rozin and colleagues introduced the term “benign masochism” for the enjoyment of experiences that are initially aversive, in circumstances where the body registers a threat that the person knows to be harmless. Examples studied include eating chilli-hot foods, sad films, frightening rides and physical exertion, and the account holds that part of the pleasure lies in recognising that the body has been misled while the person remains safe.

The concept has since been applied in other fields, including tourism research, where it has been used to account for travel experiences that are sought despite, or because of, the discomfort they involve.

== Bibliography ==
- Rozin, P., Haidt, J., & McCauley, C.R. (1993). Disgust. In M. Lewis and J. Haviland (Eds.), Handbook of Emotions, pp. 575–594. New York: Guilford.
- Rozin, P., & Nemeroff, C.J. (1990). The laws of sympathetic magic: A psychological analysis of similarity and contagion. In J. Stigler, G. Herdt & R.A. Shweder (Eds.), Cultural Psychology: Essays on comparative human development (pp. 205–232). Cambridge, England: Cambridge.
- Rozin, P., Fischler, C., Imada, S., Sarubin, A., & Wrzesniewski, A. (1999). Attitudes to food and the role of food in life: Comparisons of Flemish Belgium, France, Japan and the United States. Appetite, 33, 163–180.
- Rozin, P. (1999). "Food is fundamental, fun, frightening, and far-reaching". Social Research. 66: 9–30.
- Rozin, P., Lowery, L., Imada, S., & Haidt, J. (1999). The CAD triad hypothesis: A mapping between three moral emotions (contempt, anger, disgust) and three moral codes (community, autonomy, divinity). Journal of Personality & Social Psychology, 76, 574–586.
