= Correspondence (theology) =

Theological term for the relationship between two levels of existence

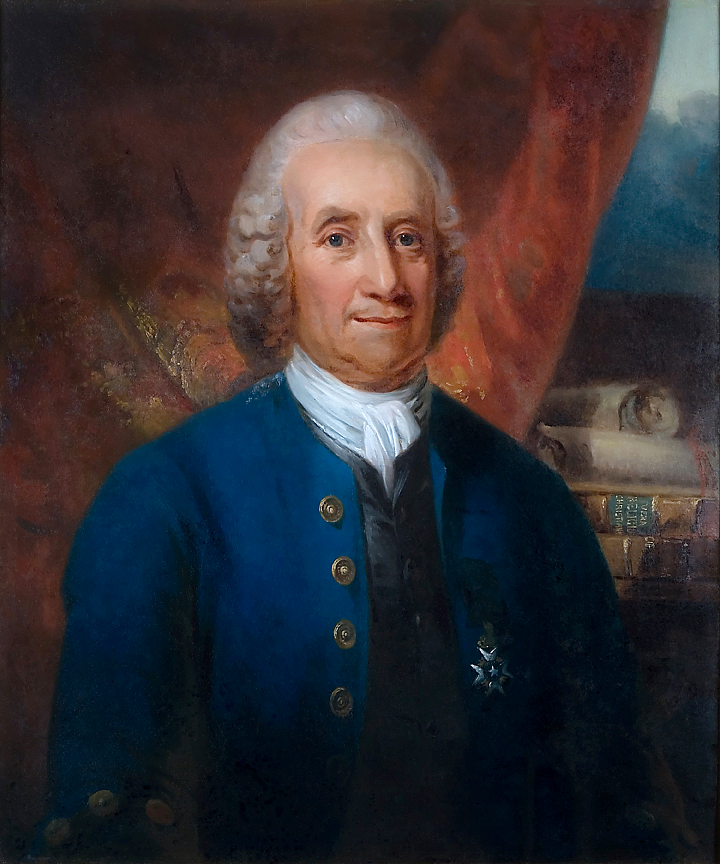
Emanuel Swedenborg

Correspondence is a relationship between two levels of existence. The term was coined by the Italian Dominican friar, priest and theologian Thomas Aquinas (1225–1274), originally in neo-Latin as correspondentia. The 18th-century theologian Emanuel Swedenborg in his Arcana Cœlestia (1749–1756), Heaven and Hell (1758) and other works used the term extensively.

== Swedenborg ==
=== Definition ===
In the terminology of Swedenborg's revelation, “correspondence” is a basic relationship found between two levels of existence.

Correspondences	
Spiritual Plane of the Mind	Natural Plane of the Mind
God Creator	World Created
Mind/Spirit	Body
Spiritual Sense of the Word	Literal Sense of the Word
Intention	Action

Thus, for instance, light corresponds to wisdom because wisdom enlightens the mind as light enlightens the eye. Warmth corresponds to love because love warms the mind as heat does the body. Swedenborg says that the Word (Bible) was written by God entirely according to correspondences so that within its natural laws and histories every detail describes the spiritual realities relating to God and man, these being the true subject of the Word. Swedenborg's 12-volume Arcana Coelestia provides verse-by-verse details of the inner meaning of Genesis and part of Exodus; the work Apocalypse Revealed does the same for the Book of Revelation. The Arcana Coelestia, for example, explains how the creation and development of the human mind corresponds to the seven days of creation in Genesis.

=== The Ancient Word ===
According to Swedenborg, angels speak to each other in correspondences, and in the early days of the Golden Age people on this earth also could speak in correspondences so that they could communicate directly with the angels. They had a holy book, the Ancient Word, which was written in correspondences, and which is still used in heaven. As the human race fell into evil, the ability to understand correspondences was lost, as was most of the Ancient Word. What was preserved of the Ancient Word, according to Swedenborg, are the first eleven chapters of Genesis. In Swedenborg's view, the first seven of these chapters were copied verbatim. He also perceived references in the Bible to various books of the Ancient Church which he thought to be now lost, including the “Wars of Jehovah” (Numbers 21:14-15), “Enunciators” or “Prophetic Enunciations” (Numbers 21:27-30) and the “Book of Jashar” or “Book of the Upright” (Jeremiah 48: 45, 46; 2 Samuel 1:17, 18; Joshua 10: 12, 13).

Of note is that, according to Swedenborg, the stories from the Ancient Word were all made-up history, written in correspondences. This would also hold for the first 11 chapters of Genesis. According to Swedenborg, making up such stories was an accepted custom in churches of antiquity, and spread widely.

When the Lord was in the world, he spoke by correspondences, and thus both spiritually and naturally at the same time. This Swedenborg thought to be apparent from the Biblical parables, in which he supposed every single expression to contain a spiritual sense. However, people of Jesus’ time only understood the natural literal level of his teaching. According to Swedenborg, correspondences were not disclosed to the primitive early Christians, because they were too simple to understand them.

=== Idolatry ===
In Swedenborg's view, the people of the Golden Age loved correspondences, and made small images to remind themselves of heavenly things. But as the human race declined into evil, and the knowledge of correspondences was almost lost, people began to worship the images themselves –in other words, they began to practice idolatry.

=== The Wise Men ===
According to Swedenborg, the knowledge of correspondences of the Ancient and Israelite Words spread widely in Asia, the Middle East and Africa. In Greece the correspondences were turned into the myths of antiquity. In Swedenborg's view there were people, notably those referred to as wise ones, diviners or magi, who still had some knowledge of correspondences until the time of the Lord's advent. This is evident from the Wise Men who came to the Lord at his birth; and this was why a star went before them, and why they brought gifts gold, frankincense, and myrrh (Matt. 2:1-2, 9-11). The star corresponded to knowledge from heaven, gold to celestial goodness, frankincense to spiritual goodness, and myrrh to natural goodness. According to Swedenborg, these three components are the correspondential basis for all worship.

=== Correspondences and Church Doctrine ===
In Swedenborg's view, Scripture cannot be properly understood without doctrine, and doctrines of the church should be confirmed from Scripture. True doctrine can only be known to those who are in enlightenment from the Lord, and those who are not can derive heresies from it. However, according to Swedenborg, the literal sense of Scripture does contain the Divine truth in all of its fullness and power, so that a person becomes conjoined with the Lord and his angels when reading it.

== Correspondence and esotericism ==
Antoine Faivre posits four fundamental elements, necessary conditions for a document, group, or movement to be eligible for consideration by scholars as esoteric. The first one is Correspondence:

Symbolic and real correspondences (there is no room for abstractions here!) are said to exist among all parts of the universe, both seen and unseen....These correspondences, considered more or less veiled at first sight, are, therefore, intended to be read and deciphered....The principles of noncontradiction and excluded middle of linear causality are replaced here by those of the included middle and synchronicity. We can distinguish two kinds of correspondences. First, those that exist in nature, seen and unseen, e.g. between the seven metals and the seven planets, between the planets and parts of the human body or character (or of society). This is the basis of astrology - correspondence between the natural world and the invisible departments of the celestial and supercelestial world, etc. Next there are correspondences between nature (the cosmos) or even history, and revealed texts. Here we find the Kabbalah, whether Jewish or Christian, and varieties of 'physica sacra'....Ultimately the world stage is a linguistic phenomena."

According to Riffard:

The doctrine of analogy and correspondence, present in all esoteric schools of thinking, upholds that the Whole is One and that its different levels (realms, worlds) are equivalent systems, whose parts are in strict correspondence. So much so that a part in a realm symbolically reflects and interacts with the corresponding part in another realm. For instance, the Sun in the mineral realm is the counterpart of the Lion in the animal realm. The relation between A and B is similar to the relation between C and D. The microcosm and macrocosm are analogous, that is, equivalent, similar in their structures, even though they are outwardly dissimilar. The parts are in strict correspondence, closely knit together and closely interacting: thus feet/pisces, veins/rivers. According to Robert Fludd (Utriusque Cosmic Historia, II), "Man is a whole world of its own, called microcosm for it displays a miniature pattern of all the parts of the universe. Thus the head is related to the Empyreal, the chest to the ethereal heaven and the belly to the elementary substance.

== See also ==
- As above, so below, a modern Hermetic maxim often understood in terms of Swedenborg's doctrine of correspondence
- Dmuta in Mandaeism
- Microcosm–macrocosm analogy, a similar view in ancient, medieval, and early modern philosophy
- Synchronicity
- Sympathetic magic

== Sources ==
- Kingslake, B. Inner Light. Swedenborg Explores the Spiritual Dimension (Appleseed 1991 Chapter 19,)
- Benz, E. Emanuel Swedenborg. Visionary Savant in the Age of Reason (Swedenborg Foundation 2002, Chapter 24)
- Trobridge, G. Swedenborg Life and Teaching (Swedenborg Foundation 1976)
