= List of occultists =

Occultism is one form of mysticism. (Note: While all occultists are mystics, not all mystics are occultists.) This list comprises and encompasses people, both contemporary and historical, who are or were professionally or otherwise notably involved in occult practices, including alchemists, astrologers, some Kabbalists, (Note: Specifically practitioners of Hermetic and Practical Kabbalah) magicians, psychics, sorcerers, and practitioners some forms of divination, especially Tarot. People who were or are merely believers of occult practices should not be included unless they played a leading or otherwise significant part in the practice of occultism.

== Antiquity ==
People professionally or notably involved in occultism prior to the Middle Ages

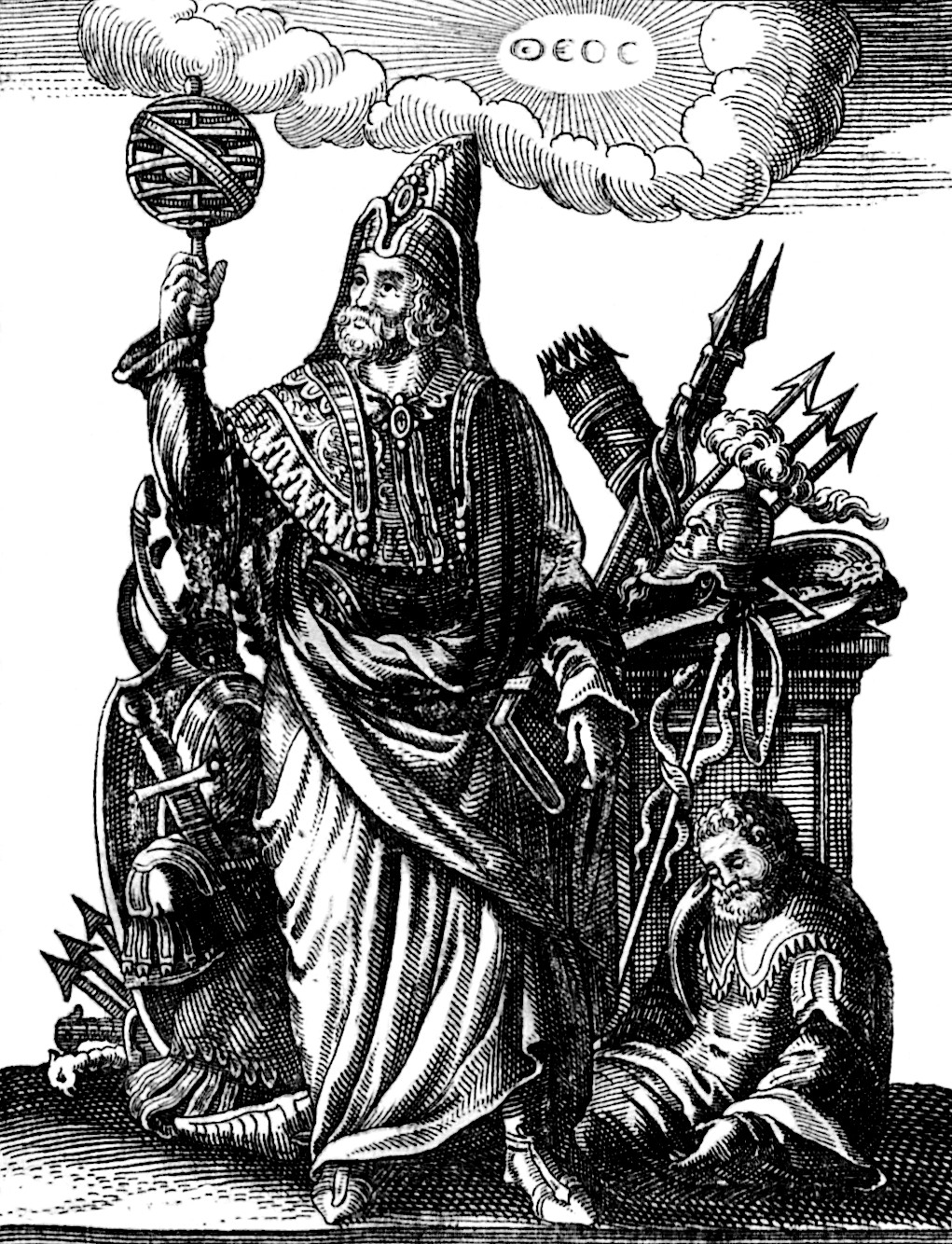
Hermes Trismegistus

- Agathodaemon – Egyptian alchemist
- Apsethus the Libyan – Ancient Libyan occultist
- Atomus – Cypriot magician (1st century)
- Chu Fu – Chinese Han dynasty occultist (d. 130 BC)
- Chymes – Greco-Roman alchemist
- Cleopatra the Alchemist – Greek alchemist and writer
- Saint Cyprian the Magician — 4th-century sorcerer from Antioch
- Elymas – Jewish magus depicted in the Acts of the Apostles
- Epigenes of Byzantium – 3rd-century BC Greek astrologer
- Fang – Earliest recorded woman alchemist in China
- Gan De – 4th-century BC Chinese astronomer and astrologer
- Hermes Trismegistus – Legendary author of the Hermetica
- Iamblichus – Neoplatonist philosopher and mystic (c. 245 – c. 325)
- Jannes and Jambres – Magicians mentioned in the Book of Exodus
- Jesus – Jesus as a historical person (Note: The idea that Jesus was a magician was first voiced by the philosopher and critic Celsus (The True Word, c. 200 CE) as we know from the rebuttal written by the Christian scholar Origen: "It was by magic that he was able to do the miracles" (Contra Celsum 1.6). Betz (1994) observes that "from early on even Jesus of Nazareth was implicated in that he was said to be mad or a magician possessed by Satan", and R. Joseph Hoffmann writes in his translation of Celsus (1987) that it is well attested that "the early Christian mission was advanced by the use of magic.")
- Julian – Roman emperor from 361 to 363, Neoplatonic philosopher
- Mary the Jewess – First Western alchemist (1st century)
- Menander – First century Samaritan Gnostic
- Moses – Prophet in Abrahamic religions
- Moses of Alexandria – Early alchemist
- Nigidius Figulus – Roman philosopher and writer
- Ostanes – Pen-name used by several pseudo-anonymous authors of Greek and Latin works of alchemy
- Paphnutia the Virgin – Egyptian alchemist
- Pseudo-Aristotle – Cognomen for authors of works falsely attributed to Aristotle
- Pseudo-Democritus – Anonymous author(s) of works falsely attributed to Democritus
- Ptolemy – Greco-Roman astronomer and geographer (c. 100–170)
- Pythagoras – Greek philosopher (c. 570 – c. 495 BC)
- Shi Shen – Chinese astronomer and astrologer
- Sima Qian – Chinese historian (c. 145 – c. 86 BCE)
- Sima Tan – Chinese astrologer and historian (c. 165–110 BCE)
- Simon Magus – Religious figure who confronted Peter
- Synesius – Ancient Greek bishop and alchemist (c.373–c.414)
- Theoris of Lemnos – 4th-century BC Greek woman
- Wei Boyang – Chinese alchemist and writer
- Witch of Endor – Biblical sorceress
- Xu Fu – Chinese alchemist and explorer
- Zhang Jue – Chinese Yellow Turban Rebellion leader (died 184)
- Zhongli Chun – Chinese occultist and consort of the King Xuan of Qi (r. 342–324 BC)
- Zoroaster – Founder of Zoroastrianism, reputed inventor of magic and astrology (c. 1000 BC) in legend
- Zosimos of Panopolis – Alchemist of the 4th century CE

== Middle Ages ==
People professionally or notably involved in occultism during the Middle Ages (circa 500–1500)

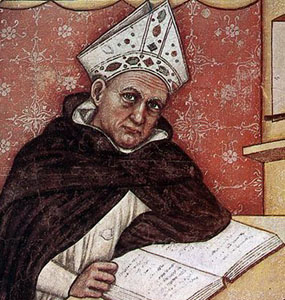
Saint Albertus Magnus, a fresco by Tommaso da Modena (1352), Chapter hall of convent of St. Nicholas, Treviso, Italy

- Abramelin the Mage – Egyptian sage (c. 1362–1458)
- Albertus Magnus – German Dominican friar and saint (c. 1200 – 1280)
- Roger Bacon – English polymath, philosopher and friar (c.1219/20–c.1292)
- Roger Bolingbroke – Astrologer and alleged necromancer, executed as witch
- Gentile Budrioli – 15th-century Italian astrologer and healer
- Johannes Lauratius de Fundis
- Marsilio Ficino – Italian astrologer and translator of the Corpus Hermeticum (1433–1499)
- Nicolas Flamel – French public scribe (c. 1340–1418)
- Jābir ibn Hayyān – Islamic alchemist and polymath (died c. 806–816)
- John of Nottingham – 14th-century English magician
- Judah Loew ben Bezalel – Czech rabbi and Kabbalist (d. 1609), reputed to have practiced Practical Kabbalah
- Myrddin Wyllt – Welsh poet and astrologer (b. 540 CE)
- Giovanni Pico della Mirandola – Italian Renaissance philosopher (1463–1494)
- Pietro d'Abano – Italian philosopher and astrologer (c. 1257–1316)
- Pseudo-Solomon – Anonymous author(s) of works falsely attributed to Solomon
- Michael Scot – Scottish mathematician and scholar (1175–c.1232)

== 16th century ==
People professionally or notably involved in occultism during the 16th century

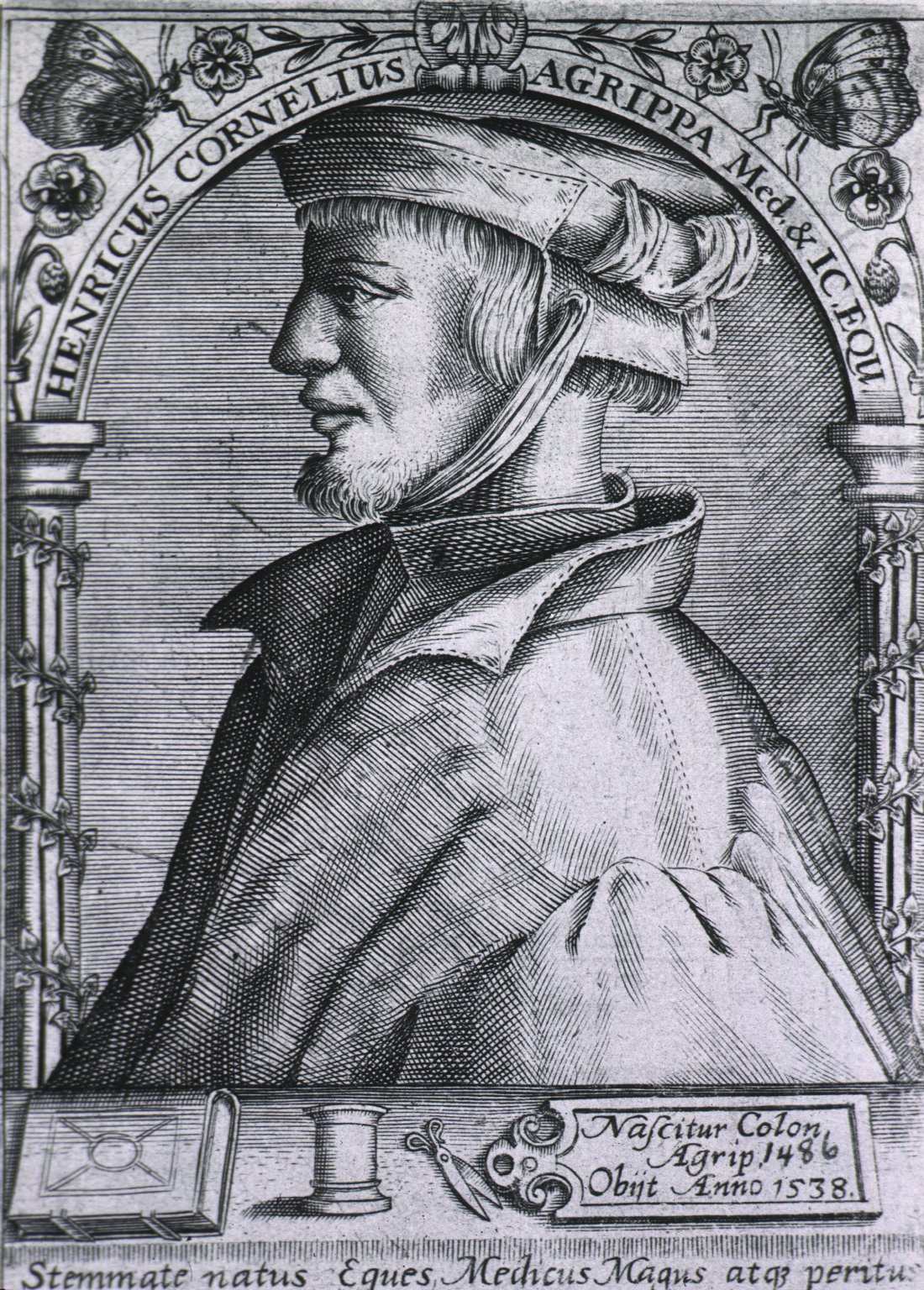
Heinrich Cornelius Agrippa, author of Three Books of Occult Philosophy

- Heinrich Cornelius Agrippa (1486–1535), occult philosopher, astrologer
- Giordano Bruno (1548–1600), occult philosopher
- Cosimo Ruggeri (fl. 1571–1615), Italian astrologer and occultist
- John Dee (1527–1608), occult philosopher, mathematician, alchemist, queen Elizabeth's advisor
- Des Eschelles Manseau (died 1571), French occultist
- Edward Kelley (1555–1597), spirit medium and alchemist who worked with John Dee, founder of Enochian magic
- John Lambe (1545–1628), astrologer to George Villiers, 1st Duke of Buckingham
- Nostradamus (1503–1566), one of the world's most famous prophets
- Paracelsus (1493–1541), medical pioneer and occult philosopher
- Henry Percy (1563-1632), "Wizard Earl"
- Johannes Reuchlin (1545–1622), German cabalist magician, summoned angels
- Soulmother of Küssnacht (d. 1577), Swiss medium
- Johannes Trithemius (1462–1516), cryptographer and magical writer
- Johann Weyer (aka Johannes Wierus) (1515–1588), German physician, occultist and demonologist

== 17th century ==
People professionally or notably involved in occultism during the 17th century

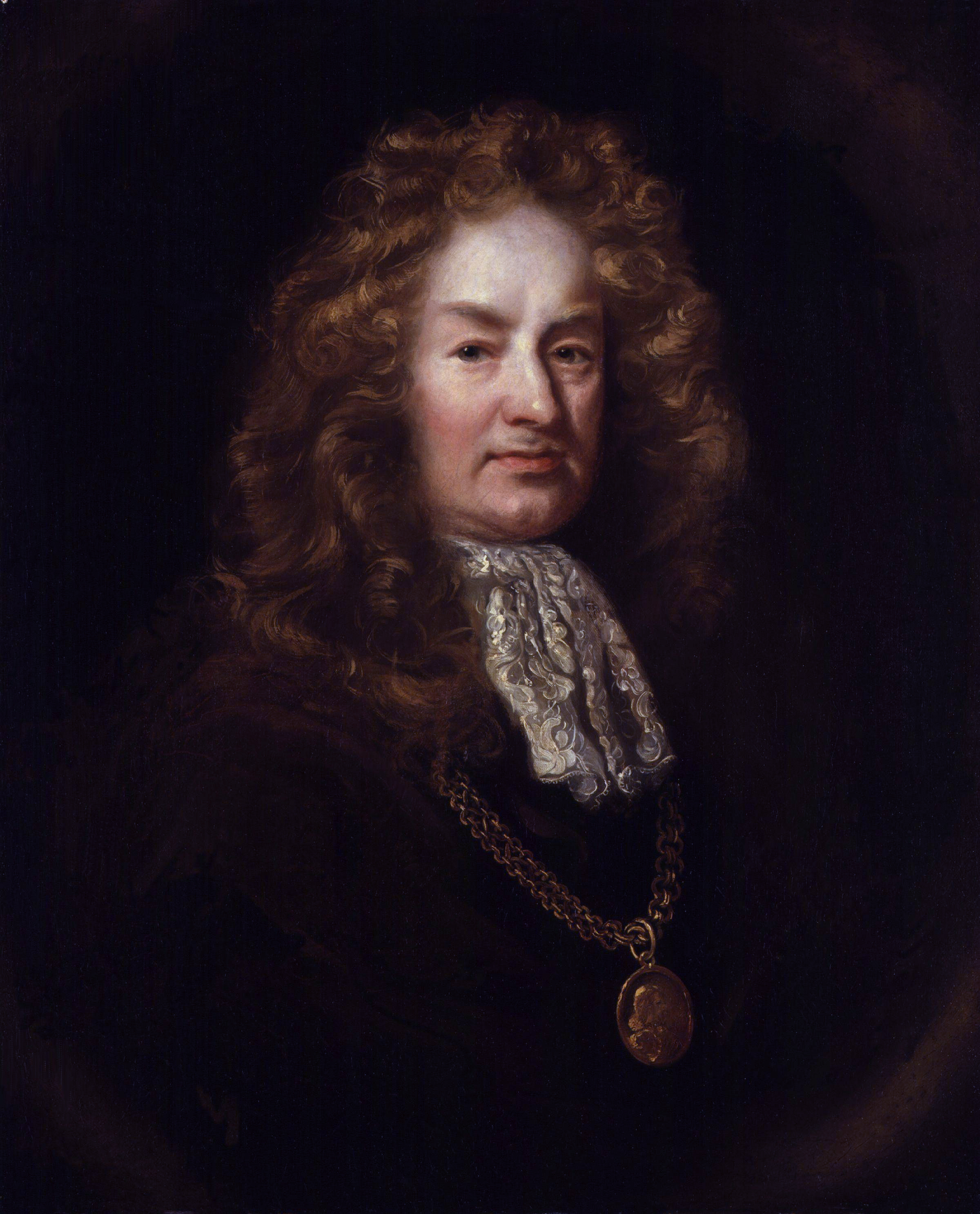
Elias Ashmole by John Riley

- Elias Ashmole (1617–1692), the first known speculative Freemason
- Olaus Borrichius (1626–1690), Danish alchemist
- Jacob Bruce (1669–1735), Russian general, statesman, diplomat, scientist and alchemist and magician of Scottish descent Clan Bruce, one of the chief associates of Peter the Great
- Arthur Dee (1575–1661), Hermetic writer, son of John Dee
- Robert Fludd (1574–1637), occult philosopher and astrologer
- Isobel Gowdie (d. 1662), self-confessed professional sorcerer
- Sir Isaac Newton (1642–1726), English physicist and alchemist
- Luís de la Penha (1581 - 1626), Portuguese occultist
- Ali Puli (17th century), anonymous author of seventeenth-century alchemical and Hermetic texts
- Gironima Spana (1615–1659), Italian astrologer
- La Voisin (1640–1680), French professional magician

== 18th century ==
People professionally or notably involved in occultism during the Age of Enlightenment (18th century)

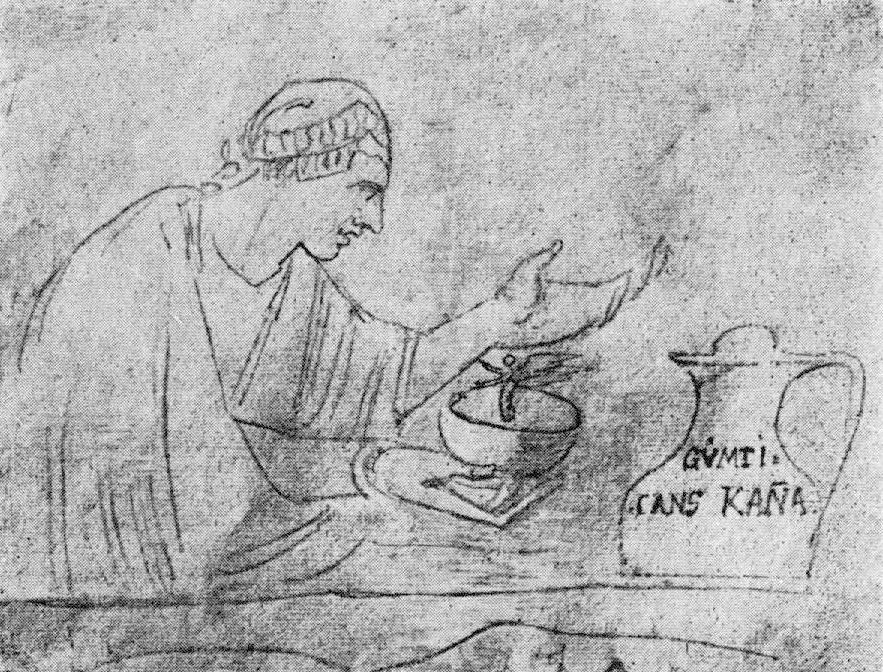
Ulrica Arfvidsson

- Ulrica Arfvidsson (1734–1801), politically influential Swedish fortune-teller
- Gustaf Björnram (1746–1804), Swedish spiritual medium
- Alessandro Cagliostro (1743–1795), Italian occultist
- Clotilde-Suzanne Courcelles de Labrousse (1747–1821), French prophet medium
- Antoine Court de Gebelin (1725–1784), connected tarot and esotericism
- Etteilla (1738–1791), fortune-teller
- Marie Kingué (fl. 1785), African kaperlata occultist and faith healer
- Marie-Anne de La Ville (1680–1725), French occultist
- Count of St. Germain (dl. 1784), alchemist and occultist
- Höffern (fl. 1722), German-Swedish fortune teller
- Henrietta Lullier (1716–1782), French fortune teller
- Franz Mesmer (1734–1815), German magnetist
- August Nordenskiold (1754–1792), alchemist and Swedenborgian
- Charlotta Roos (1771–1809), Swedish spiritual medium
- Louis-Claude de Saint-Martin (1743–1803), founder of Martinism, writer known as the Unknown Philosopher
- Emanuel Swedenborg (1688–1772), alchemist, founder of Swedenborgianism
- Henrik Gustaf Ulfvenklou (1756–1819), Swedish spiritual medium
- Raimondo di Sangro – Italian nobleman, inventor, soldier, writer, scientist, alchemist and freemason

== 19th century ==
People professionally or notably involved in occultism during the 19th century

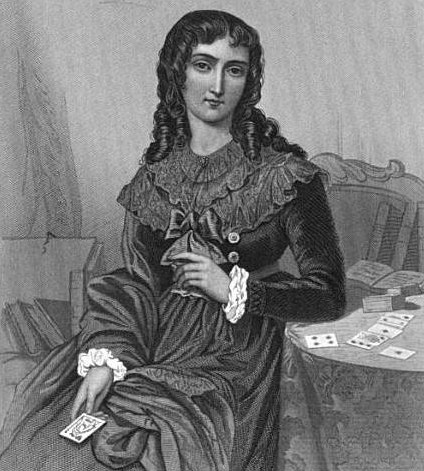
Portrait of Mlle Lenormand from The court of Napoleon

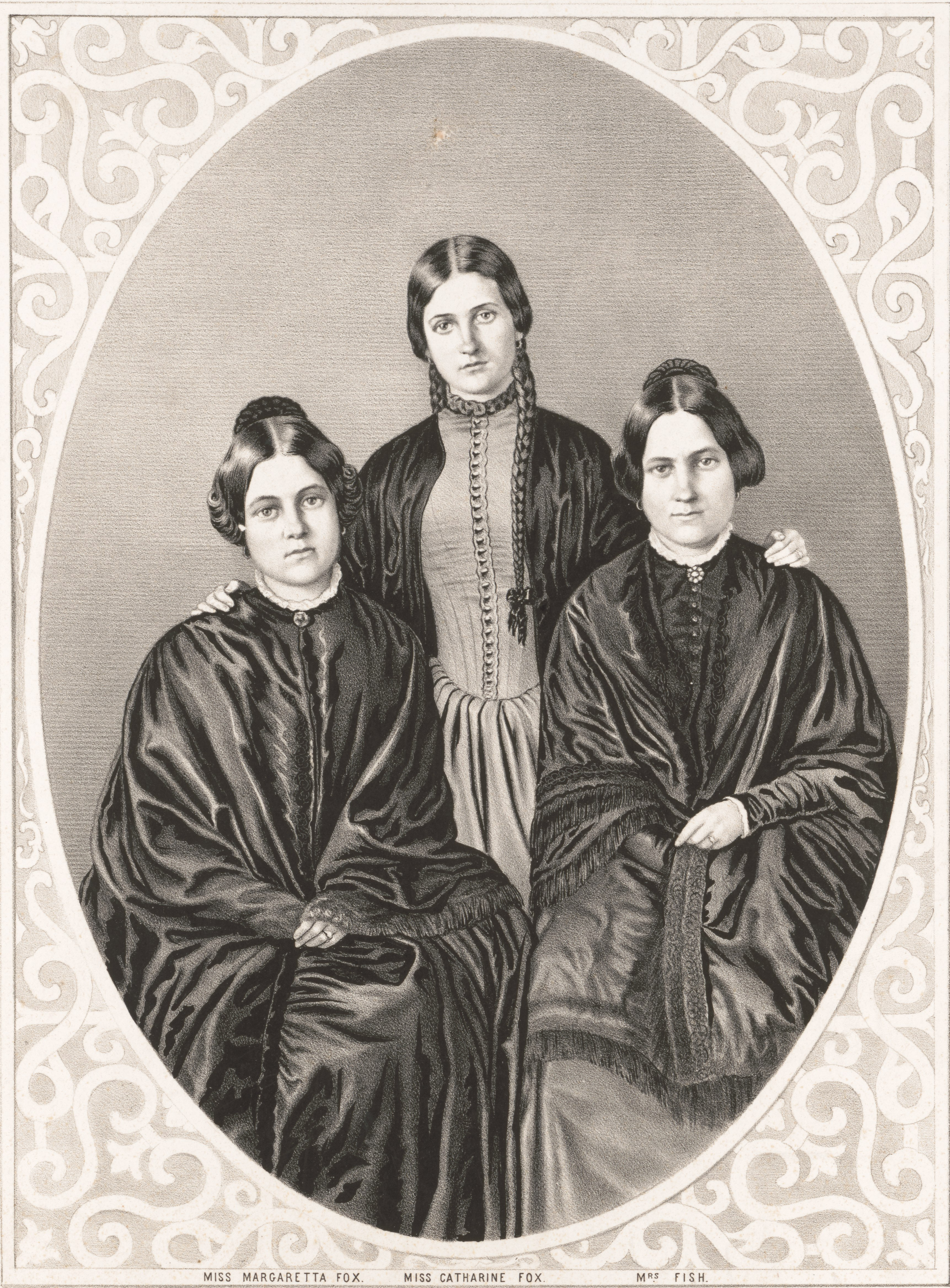
The Fox sisters; from left to right: Margaret, Kate and Leah

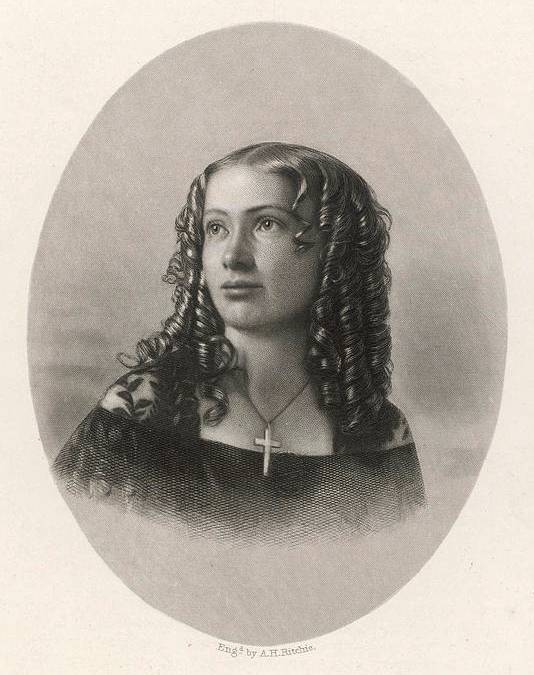
Cora L. V. Scott

- Evangeline Adams (1868–1932), astrologer to the famous
- Francis Barrett (c. 1770 – fl. 1802), wrote The Magus, a book about magic
- Alexis-Vincent-Charles Berbiguier de Terre-Neuve du Thym (1765–1851), French demonologist
- Pierre Bernard (1875–1955), American occultist, businessman and yogi popularly known as "Oom The Omnipotent"
- Annie Besant (1847–1933), British writer, socialist and occultist
- Algernon Blackwood (1869–1951), member of the Hermetic Order of the Golden Dawn
- Helena Petrovna Blavatsky (1831–1891), founder of Theosophy
- Alexander Mikhaylovich Butlerov (Алекса́ндр Миха́йлович Бу́тлеров; 1828–1886), Russian occultist
- Mary Emily Bates Coues (1835–1906), secretary, Woman's National Liberal Union
- Ida C. Craddock (1857–1902), occultist, writer, member of Theosophical Society
- Andrew Jackson Davis (1826–1910), American occultist
- Robert Felkin (1853–1926), medical missionary and explorer, member of Hermetic Order of the Golden Dawn and Stella Matutina, writer on Africa and medicine
- A. Frank Glahn (1865–1941), German mystic
- Stanislas de Guaita (1861–1899), occult writer
- Arnold Krumm-Heller (1876–1949), Rosicrucian founder of FRA
- John George Hohman (fl. 1802–1846), American wizard
- Allan Kardec (1804–1869), founder of Spiritism
- William Lyon Mackenzie King (1874–1950), served as the 10th prime minister of Canada and was secretly into the occult
- Giuliano Kremmerz (1861–1930), alchemist and occult writer
- Giustiniano Lebano – Italian lawyer and patriot (1832–1910)
- Marie Laveau (1801–1881), American New Orleans Voodoo practitioner
- Charles Webster Leadbeater (1854–1934), occult writer and influential member of the Theosophical Society Adyar
- Marie Anne Lenormand (1772–1843), French fortune-teller favoured by Joséphine de Beauharnais
- Eliphas Lévi (1810–1875), French occult writer and ceremonial magician
- Guido von List (1848–1919), Austrian writer and mystic, one of the leading thinkers within Armanism
- Arthur Machen (1863–1947), member of the Hermetic Order of the Golden Dawn
- Moina Mathers (1865–1928), first initiate in Hermetic Order of the Golden Dawn, wife of S.L. MacGregor Mathers, and Imperatrix of the Alpha et Omega
- Samuel L. MacGregor Mathers (1854–1918), founder of the Hermetic Order of the Golden Dawn
- Damodar K. Mavalankar (1857–1885), Indian theosophist
- Wolf Messing (1899–1964), Polish Russian occultists, stage mentalist
- Papus, pseudonym for Gérard Encausse (1865–1916), occult writer
- Jacques Collin de Plancy (1793–1871), French occultist, demonologist and writer
- Paschal Beverly Randolph (1825–1875), African American physician and sex magician
- Anna Rasmussen (1898–1983), Danish medium, psychic
- Grigori Rasputin (1869–1916), Russian mystic and healer
- Carl Reichenbach (1788–1869), German occultist
- Theodor Reuss (1855–1923), German mason
- August Strindberg (1849–1912), dramatist, alchemist
- Max Théon (1848–1927), occultist, Kabbalist, founder of the Cosmic Movement
- Evelyn Underhill (1875–1941), occultist, writer, particular Christian mysticism; member of GD
- Arthur Edward Waite (1857–1941), occult writer and member of Hermetic Order of the Golden Dawn
- William Wynn Westcott (1848–1925), cofounder of the Hermetic Order of the Golden Dawn
- Charles Walter Stansby Williams (1886–1945), member of A.E. Waite's the Fellowship of the Rosy Cross, 1929–1939
- William Butler Yeats (1865–1934), poet, astrologer, member of the Hermetic Order of the Golden Dawn

== 20th century ==
People professionally or notably involved in occultism during the 20th century

- Mirra Alfassa (1878–1971), Indian poet and mystic
- Kenneth Anger (1927–2023), filmmaker, writer, and Thelemite
- Dolores Ashcroft-Nowicki (1929–2026), occultist, occult writer, teacher
- Alice Bailey (1880–1949), English writer, mystic and Theosophist
- Franz Bardon (1909–1958), occult writer, magician
- Frank Bennett (1868–1930), Australian chemist who was disciple of occultist Aleister Crowley
- Carl William Hansen (1872 - 1936), Danish farmer and occultist
- Michael Bertiaux (born 1935), author of the Voudon Gnostic Workbook, occult artist
- Kerry Bolton (born 1956), New Zealand neo-Nazi activist and writer
- William Breeze (born 1955), writer, musician, patriarch of Ecclesia Gnostica Catholica, and caliph of Ordo Templi Orientis; also known as Hymenaeus Beta
- William S. Burroughs (1914–1997), Beat writer
- W. E. Butler (1898–1978), esoteric writer
- Marjorie Cameron (1922–1995), scarlet woman of Jack Parsons' rituals, artist, actress
- Peter J. Carroll (1953–2026), occultist, writer, founder of chaos magic
- Constant Chevillon (1880–1944), head of FUDOFSI
- Chic Cicero (born 1936), esoteric writer, magician, Imperator Emeritus of The Hermetic Order of the Golden Dawn, Inc.
- Sandra Tabatha Cicero (born 1959), esoteric writer, magician, Imperator of The Hermetic Order of the Golden Dawn, Inc.
- Pamela Colman Smith (1878–1951), artist, painted the Rider–Waite tarot deck, member of the Hermetic order of the Golden Dawn
- D. J. Conway (1939–2019), occult writer
- Aleister Crowley (1875–1947), English occultist and ceremonial magician, founder of Thelema religion
- Jinx Dawson (born 1950), ceremonial magician, artist, founder of rock band Coven, recording artist
- Savitri Devi (1905–1982), Greek writer on Hinduism, Nazi spy and leading figure of Esoteric Nazism
- Hilda Doolittle (1886–1961), American modernist poet, known under the pseudonym H.D.
- Gerina Dunwich (born 1959), witch and occult writer
- Lon Milo DuQuette (born 1948), musician, lecturer, and occultist
- Julius Evola (1898–1974), Italian radical right philosopher, and esotericist who helped to found the UR Group
- Dion Fortune (1890–1946), considered one of Great Britain's most famous occultists, founder of the Fraternity of the Inner Light
- Jeanne Robert Foster (1879–1970), American occultist, Theosophist, and poet
- Paul Foster Case (1884–1954), founder of BOTA, adept of the Western mystery tradition, teacher, occult writer
- Fulcanelli, French alchemist and esoteric writer
- J. F. C. Fuller (1878–1966), British senior Army officer, military historian, and strategist
- Henri Gamache (fl. 1940s), authority on the Evil Eye
- Gerald Brosseau Gardner (1884–1964), British witch, writer, father of modern Witcharft A.K.A. Wicca, latter denominated Gardnerian Wicca.
- Karl Germer (1885–1962), German and American businessman and occultist, US representative of Ordo Templi Orientis
- Sallie Ann Glassman (born 1954), practitioner of Haitian Vodou
- Rudolf John Gorsleben (1883–1930)
- Kenneth Grant (1924–2011), occultist, writer, pupil of Aleister Crowley
- John Michael Greer (born 1962), occult writer, fantasist, blogger
- Eugen Grosche (1888–1964), known as Gregor A. Gregorius, German occultist, writer, founder of the lodge Fraternitas Saturni
- Manly Palmer Hall (1901–1990), occult writer, teacher
- Erik Jan Hanussen, born Hermann Steinschneider (1889–1933)
- Inbaal Honigman (born 1974), Israeli-born British psychic, astrologer, and Wiccan priestess
- Max Heindel (1865–1919), writer
- Rudolf Hess (1894–1987), nazi interested in magic and the occult
- Heinrich Himmler (1900–1945), Nazi Reichsführer SS, also interested in magic
- Phil Hine (fl. 1980s), occult writer
- Leah Hirsig (1883–1975), American schoolteacher and occultist
- Murry Hope (1929–2012), occult writer
- L. Ron Hubbard (1911–1986), American writer and Scientology founder
- Christopher Hyatt (1943–2008), writer, teacher, publisher
- Alejandro Jodorowsky (born 1929), filmmaker, comic book writer, writer and teacher on "Psychemagia"
- Charles Stansfeld Jones (1886–1950), Canadian occultist and ceremonial magician
- George Cecil Jones (1873–1960), English chemist, occultist, member of the Hermetic Order of the Golden Dawn and co-founder of the magical order A∴A∴
- Konstantinos (born 1972), American occultist and writer
- Karl Ernst Krafft (1900–1945), occultist
- Donald Michael Kraig (1951-2014), occult writer, magician
- Siegfried Adolf Kummer (1899–1977), German occultist
- Dora van Gelder Kunz (1904–1999), occult writer
- Jörg Lanz von Liebenfels (1874–1954), Austrian occultist and pioneer of Ariosophy
- Sybil Leek (1917–1982), witch and occult writer
- James Lees (1939–2015), English magician known for English Qaballa
- James H. Madole (1927–1979), American neo-Nazi, founder of the National Renaissance Party and personal friend of Anton LaVey
- Friedrich Bernhard Marby (1882–1966), German rune occultist
- Grady Louis McMurtry (1918–1985), American ceremonial magician and "Caliph" of O.T.O.
- Alan Moore (born 1953), British writer and occultist
- Marcelo Ramos Motta (1931–1987), Brazilian occult writer and member of A∴A∴
- David Myatt (born 1950), allegedly the leader of the Order of Nine Angles
- Eddy Nawgu (1957–2000), Nigerian sorcerer and self-proclaimed prophet of the Biblical God
- Nema Andahadna (1939–2018), American occultist, ceremonial magician, and writer of Liber Pennae Praenumbra.
- Victor Benjamin Neuburg (1883–1940), poet and member of the A∴A∴
- Erwin Neutzsky-Wulff (born 1949), occultist, science fiction writer
- Eric Nord (born Harry Helmuth Pastor; 1919–1989), American Beat Generation coffeehouse and nightclub owner, poet, actor, and hipster, the "King of the Beatniks".
- Sara Northrup Hollister (1924–1997), American occultist and second wife of Scientologist founder L. Ron Hubbard.
- Rosaleen Norton (1917–1979), self-proclaimed Australian witch
- Genesis P-Orridge (1950–2020), of Psychic TV video group and TOPY, chaos magician
- Jimmy Page (born 1944), musician, occultist, member of rock band Led Zeppelin
- Tommaso Palamidessi (1915–1983), Christian occultist, founder of the Archeosophical Society
- Jack Parsons (1914–1952), occultist, writer, and rocket scientist
- Helen Parsons Smith (1910-2003), American occultist and book editor, wife of John "Jack" Whiteside Parsons who married Wilfred Talbot Smith after Parson's death.
- Israel Regardie (1907–1985), occult writer, magician, pupil of Aleister Crowley
- C. F. Russell (1897–1987), American occultist and founder of the magical order G.B.G.
- Alex Sanders (1926–1988), founder of Alexandrian Wicca
- Phyllis Seckler (1917–2004), American occultist and writer, and a lineage holder in the A∴A∴ tradition.
- Pekka Siitoin (1944-2003), Finnish neo-Nazi, occultist and a Satanist.
- Miguel Serrano (1917–2009), Chilean diplomat, writer of books on Esoteric Nazism
- Stephen Skinner (born 1948), Australian writer
- Harry Everett Smith (1923–1991), visual artist, experimental filmmaker, record collector, bohemian, mystic, largely self-taught student of anthropology, and Neo-Gnostic bishop
- Wilfred Talbot Smith (1885–1957), English occultist and ceremonial magician.
- Lionel Snell, occult writer, known as Ramsey Dukes
- Austin Osman Spare (1886–1956), writer, painter, magician
- Karl Spiesberger (1904–1992), German occultist
- Rudolf Steiner (1861–1925), founder of anthroposophy
- Ludwig Straniak (1879–1951)
- Gerald Suster (1951–2001), occult writer
- Ralph Tegtmeier (born 1952), known as Frater U∴D∴, occultist, writer, founder of Pragmatic Magic, Cyber Magic and Ice Magic
- Mellie Uyldert (1908–2009), occult writer
- Doreen Valiente (1922–1999), priestess and writer
- Leila Waddell (1880–1932), mystic and muse
- James Wasserman (1948–2020), American writer and occultist.
- Don Webb (born 1960), writer of occult books and former high priest of Temple of Set
- Sam Webster, American writer, publisher, co-founder of the Chthonic Auranian Templars of Thelema and Open Source Order of the Golden Dawn
- Samael Aun Weor (1917–1977), theurgist and founder of a "Gnostic movement"
- Karl Maria Wiligut (1866–1946), Austrian occultist and SS officer
- Colin Wilson (1931-2013), English philosopher-novelist and author of The Occult: A History
- Jane Wolfe (1875–1958), American silent film character actress.
- William Butler Yeats (1865–1939), occultist and member of the Hermetic Order of the Golden Dawn
- Catherine Yronwode (born 1947), occult author

== 21st century ==
People professionally or notably involved in occultism during the 21st century;

- Thomas Karlsson (born 1972), Swedish occultist and esoteric author
- Stephen Skinner (born 1948), Australian author, editor, publisher and lecturer
- Catherine Yronwode (born 1947), American writer, graphic designer, and practitioner of folk magic
- Jason Jorjani (born 1981), Iranian-American philosopher

== See also ==
- Aleister Crowley bibliography
- Jesus the Magician
- List of alchemists
- List of astrologers
- List of occult writers
- List of occult terms
- List of spirituality-related topics
- List of general fraternities
- Magical organization
