= Golden Dawn =

Golden Dawn or The Golden Dawn may refer to:

== Organizations ==
- Hermetic Order of the Golden Dawn, a nineteenth century Rosicrucian and hermetic magical order based in Britain
  - The Hermetic Order of the Golden Dawn, Inc., a modern revival founded in 1977
  - Open Source Order of the Golden Dawn, a modern revival founded in 2002 and disestablished in 2019
- Golden Dawn (Greece), a 21st-century fascist Greek political party and criminal organization

== Music ==
=== Bands ===
- Golden Dawn (band), an Austrian black metal band, since 1990s
- The Golden Dawn (American band), a 1960s psychedelic band
- The Golden Dawn (Scottish band), an indie pop/rock band, 1980s–1990s

=== Albums and songs ===
- Golden Dawn (album), a 2003 album by Arthemis
- "Golden Dawn", a 2002 song by Goldenhorse from Riverhead
- Golden Dawn (operetta), a 1927 operetta by Oscar Hammerstein II and Otto Harbach
- "Golden Dawn", a 1985 song by The Legendary Pink Dots from Asylum (The Legendary Pink Dots album)
- "Golden Dawn", a 1988 song by Ministry from The Land of Rape and Honey
- "Golden Dawn", a 1992 instrumental by Yngwie Malmsteen from Fire and Ice
- "Golden Dawn", a 2001 song by Edguy from Mandrake
- "Golden Dawn", a 2012 song by Goat from World Music

== Films ==
- The Golden Dawn (film), a 1921 British crime film
- Golden Dawn (film), a 1930 musical film
- Golden Dawn Girls, a 2017 Norwegian documentary about far-right politics in Greece

== Other uses ==
- Golden Dawn (magazine), neo-fascist magazine in Greece
- The Golden Dawn (Call of Cthulhu), a 1996 supplement for the role-playing game Call of Cthulhu
- The Golden Dawn, a book by Israel Regardie
- Golden Dawn Tarot, a tarot deck by Chic Cicero and Sandra Tabatha Cicero
- Golden Dawn Publications, a former name of the publisher Mandrake of Oxford
