= The Hermetic Order of the Golden Dawn, Inc. =

Magical organization founded in 1977

Official logo of the Order

The Hermetic Order of the Golden Dawn, Inc. is a 501(c) non-profit organization associated with a modern magical Order of the same name. While bearing the same name as the historical Hermetic Order of the Golden Dawn (1888–1908), the modern Order does not have or claim direct descent or institutional lineage from the original Order or from the Societas Rosicruciana in Anglia. However, it does claim "initiatory lineage" to the original Order on their About Us page on their official website. The order is run by Chic Cicero and Sandra Tabatha Cicero.

According to author Gerald Suster, this Order is notable for having the only working Golden Dawn temple in the United States at the end of the 1970s.

== History ==
According to founder Chic Cicero, in 1977 he rented a house in Columbus, Georgia for sole use as a Golden Dawn temple, he and his wife established an autonomous Golden Dawn temple there, built a Neophyte Hall and Vault of the Adepti, and called the resulting temple Isis-Urania, "after the original London temple of Mathers, Westcott and Woodman".

In June 1982, Israel Regardie traveled to the Isis-Urania temple to take on the offices of Initiating Hierophant and Chief Adept in the temple's Vault of the Adepti. During the visit, Regardie initiated two people into the Adeptus Minor grade and a third into the Neophyte grade. During this time, Regardie also consecrated the Ciceros' Vault of the Adepti and established the Second Order.

In 1988, The Hermetic Order of the Golden Dawn, Inc. was incorporated in the State of Florida, with Chic Cicero listed as its registered agent and President. The organization has been granted 501(c) tax exempt status by the United States Internal Revenue Service. It owns and maintains a website as well as a free online magazine dedicated to the Western Esoteric Tradition. According to its official website, the organization promotes the published teachings (Note: The originally secret teaching of the Hermetic Order of the Golden Dawn were published first by Aleister Crowley in The Equinox and later by Israel Regardie.) of the original Hermetic Order of the Golden Dawn for the purpose of "the continued preservation of that body of knowledge known as Hermeticism or the Western Esoteric Tradition".

== Trademarks and certification ==
In 1995, the Florida corporation filed an application with the United States Patent and Trademark Office to trademark the logo and design for "The Hermetic Order of the Golden Dawn". The trademark registration was granted in 1997.

== See also ==
- Ceremonial magic – Variety of rituals of magic
- Hermeticism – Philosophy based on the teachings of Hermes Trismegistus
- Rosicrucianism – 17th-century European spiritual movement
