= Carl Boheman =

Carl Boheman may refer to:

- Carl Henrik Boheman (1796–1868), Swedish entomologist
- Carl Adolf Boheman (1764–1831), Swedish mystic, Freemason, merchant and royal secretary
