= Marcin Bylica =

Polish astronomer

Marcin Bylica (c. 1433 in Olkusz – 1493 in Buda), also known as Martin Bylica, Martin of Olkusz and Marcin z Olkusza, was a Polish astronomer and astrologer at the court of Matthias Corvinus, King of Hungary.

== Biography ==
Son of burgher Jan, waterworks caretaker of Olkusz. He studied first probably at parish school in Olkusz, and later at the University of Cracow, where he doubtless studied under the astronomer Marcin Król z Żurawicy. Bylica was invited by Johannes Lauratius de Fundis and taught astronomy at the University of Bologna in 1463.

In 1464, he was in Rome as the astrologer to a cardinal - either Pietro Barbo, who was elevated to the papacy as Paul II in that year, or Rodrigo Borgia, the future pope Alexander VI. In Rome, Bylica met Regiomontanus and began a fruitful collaboration with him. They jointly developed astronomical tables and Disputationes inter Viennensem et Cracoviensem super Cremonensia in planetarum theoriae deliramenta (lat. Dialogues between a Viennese and a Cracovian about Gerard of Cremona's thoughts on planetary theories) - a critique of an obsolete astronomy book.

Not long after, Bylica and Regiomontaus were summoned by John Vitéz, archbishop of Esztergom, and his nephew Janus Pannonius, bishop of Pécs, to join their recently founded university in Presburg, known as the Universitas Istropolitana. Working in the palace of Esztergom where John Vitéz had installed an astronomic observatory, they set the Tabulæ directionum et profectionum in 1467. These tables were meant to allow astrologers to predict the future based on one's date of birth. They proved popular, going through 11 printed editions by 1626.

In the spring of 1468, Bylica became the official astrologer of Matthias Corvinus, King of Hungary. The appointment followed a public disputation he had with his colleague Johannes Stercz, almost certainly in Presburg, in the presence of the king and his court, about the horoscope of the conception of the son of count János Rozgon. By Bylica's own account, Stercz was humiliated. Matthias declared Bylica the winner and awarded him 100 florins. Bylica subsequently became one of Corvinus' closest councilors.

At his death, Bylica bequeathed an important collection of books and astronomical instruments, which survive to this day, to the university in Cracow. The book collection includes works by Regiomontanus and Georg von Peuerbach, as well as the Tractatus Astrarii by Giovanni Dondi dell'Orologio.

During last year of Nicolaus Copernicus in 1494, a large globe, two astrolabes and a triquetrum from Bylica were brought as a gift to the University of Cracow.

There is a street named after him in his hometown, Olkusz.

== Works ==
- with Regiomontanus, Disputationes inter Viennensem et Cracoviensem super Cremonensia in planetarum theoriae deliramenta.
- Vitae archiepiscoporum gnesnensium, published in full after 1680.

== Bibliography ==
- Birkenmajer, Alexander. "Bylica Marcin." In Polski Słownik Biograficzny, vol. 3: Brożek Jan – Chwalczewski Franciszek. Cracow, 1989. ISBN 8304032910.
- Birkenmajer, Alexander. "L'université de Cracovie, centre international d'enseignement astronomique à la fin du Moyen Âge." In Études d'histoire des sciences en Pologne, 483-95. Cracow, 1972.
- Lajos Bartha. "Ein Renaissance Himmelsglobus als astronomisches Instrument: der Dorn-Bylica-Globus aus dem Jahr 1480 = A Renaissance Celestial Globe as an Astronomic Instrument: the Dorn-Bylica Globe, 1480." Der Globusfreund 38 (1990), 37-44.
- Hayton, Darin. "Martin Bylica at the Court of Matthias Corvinus: Astrology and Politics in Renaissance Hungary." Centaurus 49, n°3 (August 2007): 185-98.
- Boudet, Jean-Patrice, and Darin Hayton. "Matthias Corvin et l'horoscope de fondation de l'université de Presbourg en 1467." In Matthias Corvin, les bibliothèques princières et la genèse de l'État moderne (actes de colloque), edited by Jean-François Maillard, István Monok and Donatella Nebbiai, 205-14. Budapest, 2009.
