= Magical motto =

Pseudonyms taken by individuals in magical organizations

Magical mottoes are the magical nicknames, pen names, or pseudonyms taken by individuals in a number of magical organizations. These members were known and sometimes referred to in many publications by these mottoes. Members of these organizations typically adopted such a motto at their initiation into the neophyte grade of the organizations.

Magical mottoes are taken in order to separate the magician's magical identity from their mundane identity within the context of magical work. Within the highly influential tradition of the Hermetic Order of the Golden Dawn, the mottoes chosen were usually in a foreign language, often but not always Latin. The mottoes were sometimes called the initiate's "aspiration name," and most contain high-minded sentiments and often literary allusions. Members were free to change them upon receiving initiations into higher degrees of the organizations; William Butler Yeats began as Festina Lente (Latin: "Make haste slowly") and changed it later in his career with the Golden Dawn.

Within the Golden Dawn tradition, documents and instructions were typically issued under the initials of the magical mottoes of their authors. For example, the document Of Skrying and Travelling in the Spirit-Vision was written by Moina Mathers, and as such appears credited to "Soror V.N.R.", standing for her motto Vestigia Nulla Retrorsum. And, The Tree of Life as Projected as a Solid Sphere is credited to "S.R.M.D.", indicating that its author was Samuel Liddell MacGregor Mathers. Within this tradition, users of magical mottoes typically referred to each other in their capacity as initiates as Frater (men) or Soror (women), Latin for "brother" and "sister" respectively, followed by the initials of their magical mottoes.

== Hermetic Order of the Golden Dawn ==
- Julian Baker – Causa Scientiae (Latin: "For the sake of knowledge")
- Edmund William Berridge – Resurgam (Latin: "I will rise again")
- Aleister Crowley – Perdurabo (Latin: "I will endure" or " I will endure until the end")
- Florence Farr – Sapientia Sapienti Dono Data (Latin: "Wisdom is a gift given to the wise")
- F. L. Gardner – De Profundis Ad Lucem (Latin: "From the depths to the light")
- Maud Gonne – Per Ignem ad Lucem (Latin: "Through fire to the light")
- Annie Horniman – Fortiter et Recte (Latin: "Strongly and rightly")
- Moina Mathers – Vestigia nulla retrorsum (Latin: "I never retrace my steps")
- Samuel Liddell MacGregor Mathers (founder) – 'S Rioghail Mo Dhream (Gaelic: "Royal is my race")
- Mrs. Simpson – Perseverantia et Cura Quies (Latin: "Perseverance and care for rest")
- Miss Elaine Simpson – Fidelis (Latin: "Faithful")
- Colonel Webber – Non Sine Numine (Latin: "Not without divine favor")
- William Wynn Westcott (founder) – Sapere Aude (Latin: "Dare to Know")
- A. F. A. Woodford – Sit Lux et Lux Fuit (Latin: "There is light and there was light")
- William Robert Woodman (founder) – Magna est Veritas et Praevalebit (Latin: "Great is the Truth and it shall prevail")
- William Butler Yeats – Demon est Deus inversus (Latin: "The demon is the reverse of God")

George Cecil Jones (Volo Noscere Frater DDS "Eu saberei")

=== Alpha et Omega ===
- Allen Bennett – Iehi Aour (Hebrew: "Let there be light")
- J. W. Brodie-Innes – Sub Spe (Latin: "Under hope")
- Violet Mary Firth – Dion Fortune "Deo, non fortuna" (ancient motto of Barons & Earls Digby, Latin: "By God, not by chance")
- George Cecil Jones – Volo Noscere Frater D.D.S. "I Will know" )
- Mrs. Tranchell-Hayes – Ex Fide Fortis (Latin: "strength out of faith")

=== Stella Matutina ===
- Harriet Felkin – Quaestor Lucis (Latin: "Seeker of light")
- Robert Felkin – Finem Respice (Latin: "Look to the end"): Imperator
- Mr. Meakin – Ex Orient Lux (Latin: "Light from the East")
- Israel Regardie – Ad Majoram Adonai Gloriam (Latin: "For the greater glory of the Lord")

== A∴A∴ ==
- Aleister Crowley – To Mega Therion (Greek: "The Great Beast")/ Baphomet
- J.F.C. Fuller – Per Ardua ad Astra (Latin: "By struggle to the stars")
- Charles Stansfeld Jones – Unus In Omnibus (Latin: "One in All") and also Parsival
- George Cecil Jones – Volo Noscere (Latin: "I Wish to Know")
- Victor Benjamin Neuburg – Omnia Vincam (Latin: "I will conquer all")
- Austin Osman Spare – Yihoveaum
- Jane Wolfe -- Estai – (Greek έσται: "I will be")
- Frieda Harris – TzBA (Hebrew: "Host")
- Leila Waddell – Agatha

== Ordo Templi Orientis ==
- George Macnie Cowie – Fiat Pax (Latin: "Let there be peace")
- Karl Germer – Saturnus
- Grady McMurtry – Hymenaeus Alpha
- Jack Parsons – Thelema Obtentum Procedero Amoris Nuptiae (Grammatically incorrect Latin for "The establishment of Thelema through the rituals of love.")
- Aleister Crowley – Baphomet
- Gerald Gardner – Scire (Latin: "to know")

== See also ==
- Craft name
- Nomen mysticum
- Religious name
