= Apsethus the Libyan =

Ancient Libyan occultist

Apsethus the Libyan (Greek: Ἄψεθος, 2nd century AD) was an occultist. Multiple accounts mentioned his mystic and occult skills. Apsethus attempted to prove that he was divine, leading to claims that he desired to become God. He was compared with Simon Magus.

Apsethus asserted himself to be God. He trained parrots that flew around Northern Africa, uttering the phrase "Apsethus is God". The Libyans sacrificed to Apsethus, as they started believing him to be a voice from Heaven. Later a Greek caught one of these parrots. He trained the parrot to say, "Apsethus, having caged us, compelled us to say Apsethus is a god". Eventually, the Libyans burned Apsethus.

== See also ==
- List of occultists
