= Edmund William Berridge =

Edmund William Berridge (1843–1923) was a medical doctor in London, homoeopathist in the United States and occultist. He joined the Golden Dawn in May 1889, taking the magical name "Respiro" and the motto Resurgam (I shall rise again). He was also a follower of Thomas Lake Harris.

In the book Moonchild written by Aleister Crowley, Berridge is grossly depicted as Dr Balloch, a professional abortion provider. Earlier, in 1911, Berridge testified in court on the matter of Crowley's reputation.

== The Golden Dawn ==
Berridge was an active member of the Isis-Urania lodge and according to biographer Francis King, he was the only senior Adeptus who remained loyal to Mathers during the revolt in 1900. He wrote (under a pseudonym) a series of articles for the Unknown World, an occult magazine published by A.E. Waite. It was Berridge who introduced Waite to the Golden Dawn.

Berridge was appointed by Mathers, as his London representative. In his autobiography (Shadows of Life and Thought), Waite explains that a few of the members approached him to allege that the temple was badly mismanaged, and had soon died out. As King indicates, this might not be true at the time. The temple became active as early as 1903 and was still flourishing in 1913, with twenty-three members.

Many of the members of the Golden Dawn wrote knowledge lectures, called flying rolls. During his time in the Isis-Urania Temple he wrote two of their knowledge lectures and collaborated on a third. On December 11, 1892, he issued flying roll number 5 titled Some Thoughts on the Imagination. On January 12, 1894, he issued flying roll number 24 titled Horary Figure, derived from a lecture he gave on the subject of horary astrology.

== Bibliography ==
- Complete repertory to the homoeopathic materia medica. 1873, reprinted in 1994 by B. Jain Publishers

== Sources ==
- Colquhoun, Ithel (1975). The Sword of Wisdom: MacGregor Mathers and the Golden Dawn. G. P. Putnam's Sons. ISBN 0-85435-092-6.
- King, Francis X. (1989). Modern Ritual Magic: The Rise of Western Occultism (2nd ed.). Prism. ISBN 1-85327-032-6.
- King, Francis X. (March 1997). Ritual Magic of the Golden Dawn. Inner Traditions/Bear. ISBN 0-89281-617-1.
- Yeats, W.B. (1994). The Collected Letters of W.B. Yeats: 1901-1904. Oxford University Press. ISBN 0-19-812683-2.
- Mathers, Samuel Liddell MacGregor (1995). The Goetia: the lesser key of Solomon the King (2nd ed.). Red Wheel. ISBN 978-0-87728-847-3.
