= A Garden of Pomegranates =

1931 book written by Israel Regardie

- First edition
- Author: Israel Regardie
- Published: 1932
- Publisher: Rider
- Pages: 160
- ISBN: 1-56718-141-4

A Garden of Pomegranates is a 160-page book, written by Israel Regardie in 1931.

== History ==
The first edition was published in 1932. The book was printed four times, with a second edition being published in 1970 by Llewellyn Publications. The title pays homage to Moses ben Jacob Cordovero's Pardes Rimonim, or "Pomegranate Orchard."

A third edition was printed in 1999, by Llewellyn Publications. This edition includes two introductions by Regardie, and one from Chic and Sandra Tabatha Cicero. The third edition is also furnished with a series of annotations done by the Ciceros, and an additional 320-page qabalistic textbook, titled Skrying On The Tree of Life.

Regardie dedicates the book to Aleister Crowley and identifies the text as a theoretical introduction to the foundation of the magical work of the Hermetic Order of the Golden Dawn.

== Sources ==
- Regardie, Israel. A Garden of Pomegranates: Skrying on the Tree of Life, Llewellyn Publications. ISBN 1-56718-141-4
