= Die Sagerin =

Alleged Swiss witch (d. 1573)

Eva Roller
- Died: December 1573
- Other name: Die Sagerin
- Children: 3

Die Sagerin (Ger: the (female) sayer) (died December 1573) was an alleged Swiss witch. Her real name was Eva Roller, but she is known in history under her nickname. She lived in the canton of Luzern in Switzerland.

== Life ==
Eva had been accused of sorcery in 1568, but was freed from the charges. In the second trial against her five years later, her accusers were her husband and her three daughters from an earlier marriage.

She had a long reputation of sorcery. Her family claimed that she could turn herself into a crow, hide herself in the ground in the shape of a mouse and walk through locked doors, that she was cold during intercourse and had blue marks on her chest. A rancher accused her of hurting his cattle after she had been acquitted in the first trial, several claimed to have seen her on nights with the moon up in white clothes, after which the weather had turned bad, and her husband said that she had told him that she was a witch but would never admit it.

She never admitted guilt, despite interrogation under torture: she begged her torturers to kill her, or give her the opportunity to kill herself, she begged to be drowned instead of being burned alive. She died in prison of unknown causes, claimed to be some kind of sickness, and her corpse was burned publicly in December 1573.

== See also ==
- Anna Göldi
- Soulmother of Küssnacht
