= Johann Beckenschlager =

15th-century archbishop of Salzburg and Esztergom

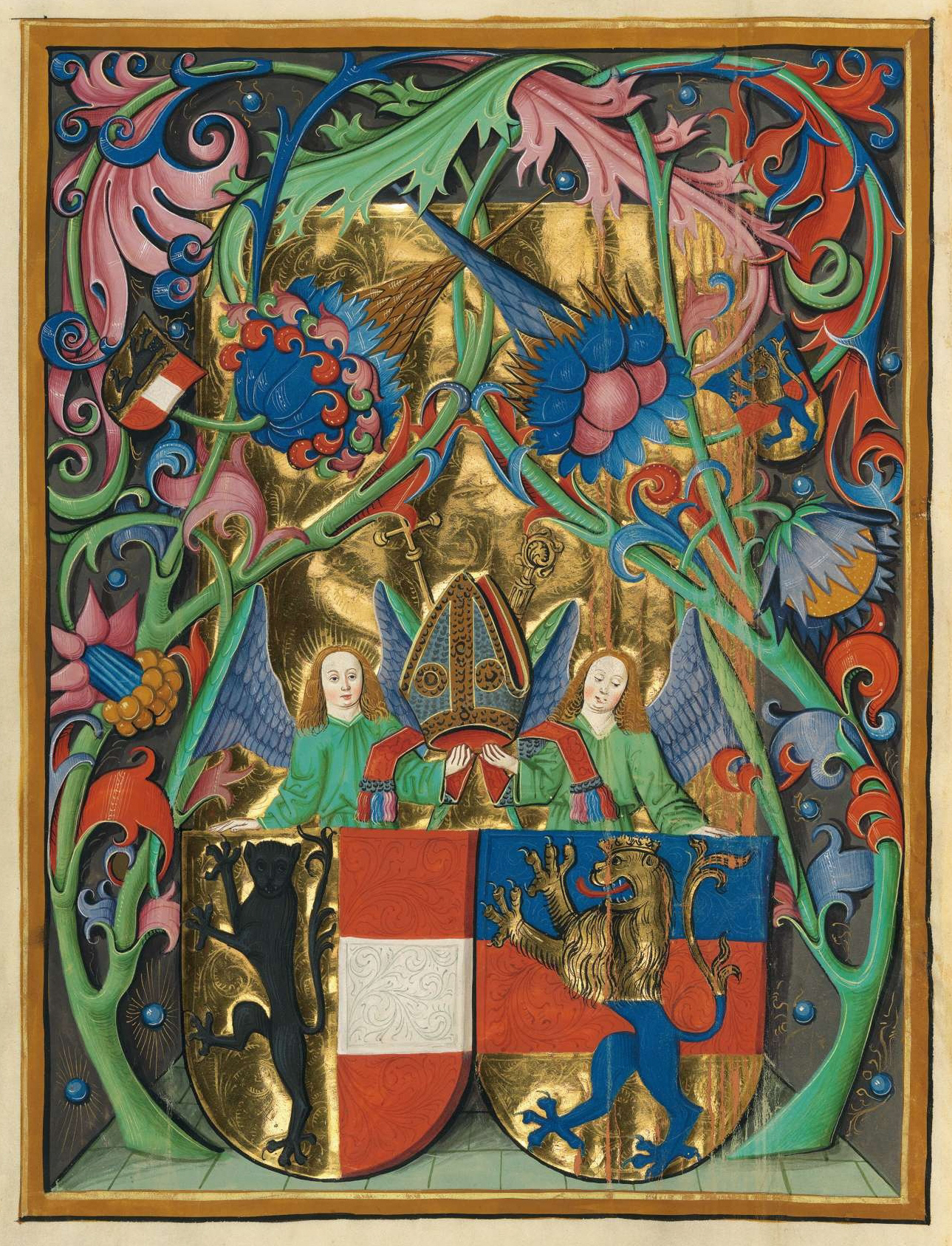
Coat of arms

Johann Beckenschlager, also known as Johann Beckensloer, Johann Pflueger or Johann Peckensloer, (Hungarian: Beckensloer János; c. 1435 in Breslau – 15 December 1489 in Salzburg) was Archbishop of Esztergom and as John III Archbishop of Salzburg.

== Early life ==
He was born the son of a blacksmith.

== Career ==
Matthias Corvinus made him the dean of Pécs and on 17 May 1465 the Bishop of Várad. In 1468 he became Bishop of Eger and in 1473 Archbishop of Esztergom and Primate of Hungary. He lost the favor of the Hungarian king and left Hungary on 13 February 1476 and joined Emperor Frederick III to whom he was a consultant and financier. From 22 March 1477, he was coadjutor for the seriously ill bishop of Vienna, Leo von Spaur. In 14 January 1482 he became John III, Archbishop of Salzburg, and in 1487 became archbishop.

Johann was more a secular warlord than a spiritual leader and archbishop. He was renowned for his extraordinary physical strength. This archbishop loved creature comforts and used the secret passage of his predecessor to visit his concubines.

Beck was unpopular with the populace. He was a diplomat for Emperor Frederick III, working abroad, in Styria and the Netherlands. On 21 June 1486, the emperor appointed him governor of Austria (Upper and Lower), Styria, Carinthia, Carniola, Istria, and the Karst. From May 1486 he was responsible for the recruitment of imperial mercenaries in the war against the Hungarian king.

His last years were spent on the Hohensalzburg Fortress, which he was determined to expand.

Catholic Church titles
Preceded by Bernhard von Rohr	Archbishop of Salzburg; 1482 – 1489	Succeeded by Friedrich V. von Schaunberg
Preceded by Leo von Spaur	Administrator of Vienna; 1480 – 1482	Succeeded by Bernhard von Rohr
Preceded by János Vitéz	Archbishop of Esztergom; 15 March 1474 – 21 March 1487	Succeeded by Ippolito d'Este
