= John Vitéz =

Hungarian archbishop (1408–1472)

His Eminence John Vitéz
- Cardinal Archbishop of Esztergom; Primate of Hungary
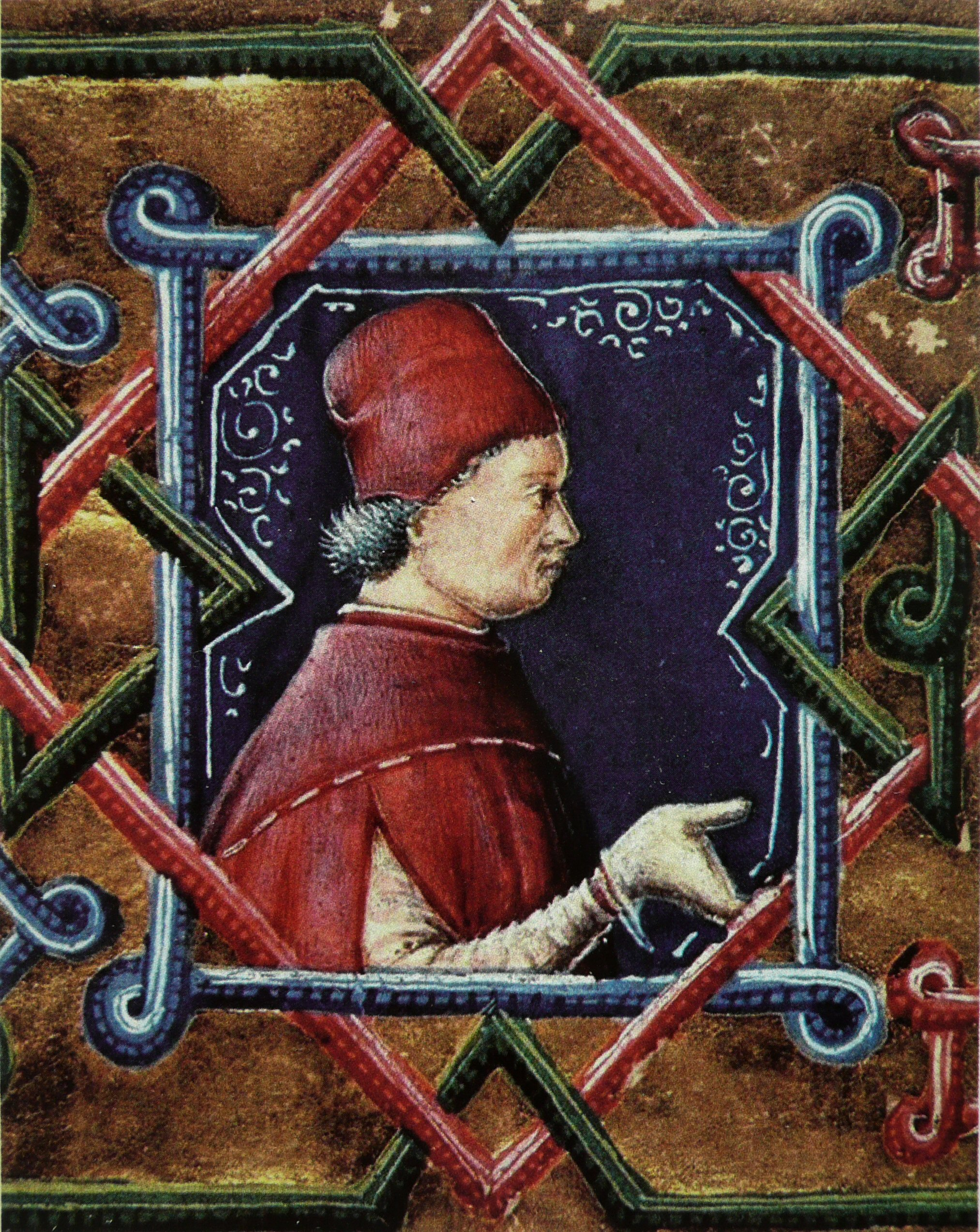
- Archdiocese: Esztergom
- Installed: 15 May 1465
- Term ended: 8 August 1472
- Predecessor: Dénes Szécsi
- Successor: Johann Beckenschlager
- Previous post: Bishop of Várad (1445–1465)

Orders
- Created cardinal: 1471
- Rank: Archbishop of Esztergom

Personal details
- Born: c. 1408 Zredna, Kingdom of Hungary
- Died: 8 August 1472 Esztergom, Kingdom of Hungary
- Denomination: Catholic
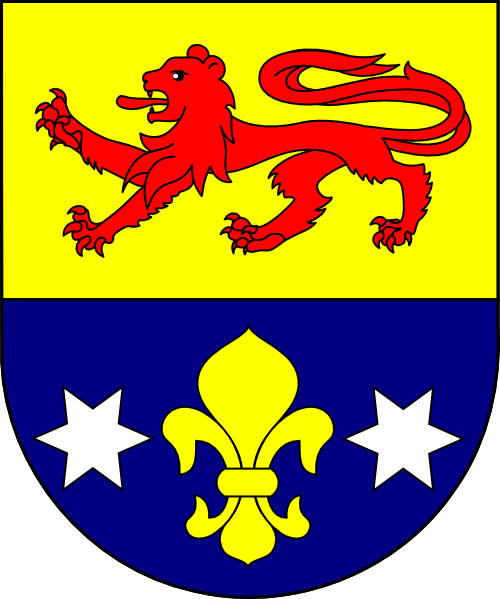
- Coat of arms

John Vitéz de Zredna (Hungarian: zrednai Vitéz János, Croatian: Ivan Vitez od Sredne, Slovak: Ján Vitéz zo Sredny; c. 1408 – 8 August 1472) was a Hungarian and Croat humanist, diplomat, Latinist, mathematician, astrologist and astronomer. He served as Archbishop of Esztergom from 1465 until his death.

== Early life ==
Vitéz was born in Sredna near Križevci in a Croat-Hungarian family which was already influential at the Hungarian court. Vitéz's mother was originated from the Garázda genus (originally from Bosnia, genus is named after Goražde). On his father's side he derived from Pilis county (his father's surname was originally Csévi). His father was the secretary of the regent John Hunyadi, from 1446 to 1452. Vitéz became a prothonotary in his government.

Vitéz studied in Vienna, where he graduated in law and became knowledgeable in physics, astronomy and alchemy due to frequent contacts with other humanists. In the chancery of King Sigismund, he probably met the excellent Italian humanist Pier Paolo Vergerio. For a while (around 1437) he was the canon in Zagreb. In that period, he helped strengthen the relations between the Croatian capital and the thriving Italian cultural and scientific centers. Then he left for Hungary, where he was to play a major role in the development of cultural and scientific institutions.

== Career ==
Vitéz was one of the educators of Hunyadi's son Matthias Corvinus, who became King of Hungary. Vitéz became the bishop of Oradea in 1445 and turned it into a humanist centre, where he invited a number of Polish and German humanists, such as Gregory of Sanok. He was a book collector and built a library there. Both his court and the library moved from Oradea to Esztergom in 1465, when he became the primate of Hungary, or the archbishop of Esztergom – one of the two bishoprics in Hungary.

In the government of Matthias Corvinus, he fulfilled many positions. First of all, due to his earlier practice, he was an excellent diplomat to the king. In 1458 he was sent to Prague to George of Poděbrady to redeem the king and then he (according to Bonfini) welcomed the king when he entered the kingdom. He served the king in a few diplomatic missions, especially to the Holy Roman Emperor Frederick III. After 1464 he became active in the highest and secret chancellor (together with Stephen Várdai), but did not take many actions in the position. During the late 1460s he became estranged to the king and in 1471 he led a plot against the ruler.

Vitéz, who spoke and wrote in excellent Latin, had a major role in the international circle of humanists at Corvin's court, some of whom were prominent scientists, such as Regiomontanus, Bylica, Peuerbach, Hans Dorn. He was especially interested in natural sciences and promoted their study. He founded the academy and library in Oradea (moved to Esztergom) and the Universitas Istropolitana in Pozsony (currently Bratislava). He promoted astrologic and astronomic research, had astronomic instruments of his own, and founded the observatory in Esztergom. He is sometimes referred to as the Father of Hungarian Humanism.

As the initiator of a rebellion against the king (1471–1472), he lost his privileges and estates. Soon after, he fell ill and died in Esztergom.

His nephew was the great Latin humanist Janus Pannonius.

== See also ==
- List of Catholic clergy scientists

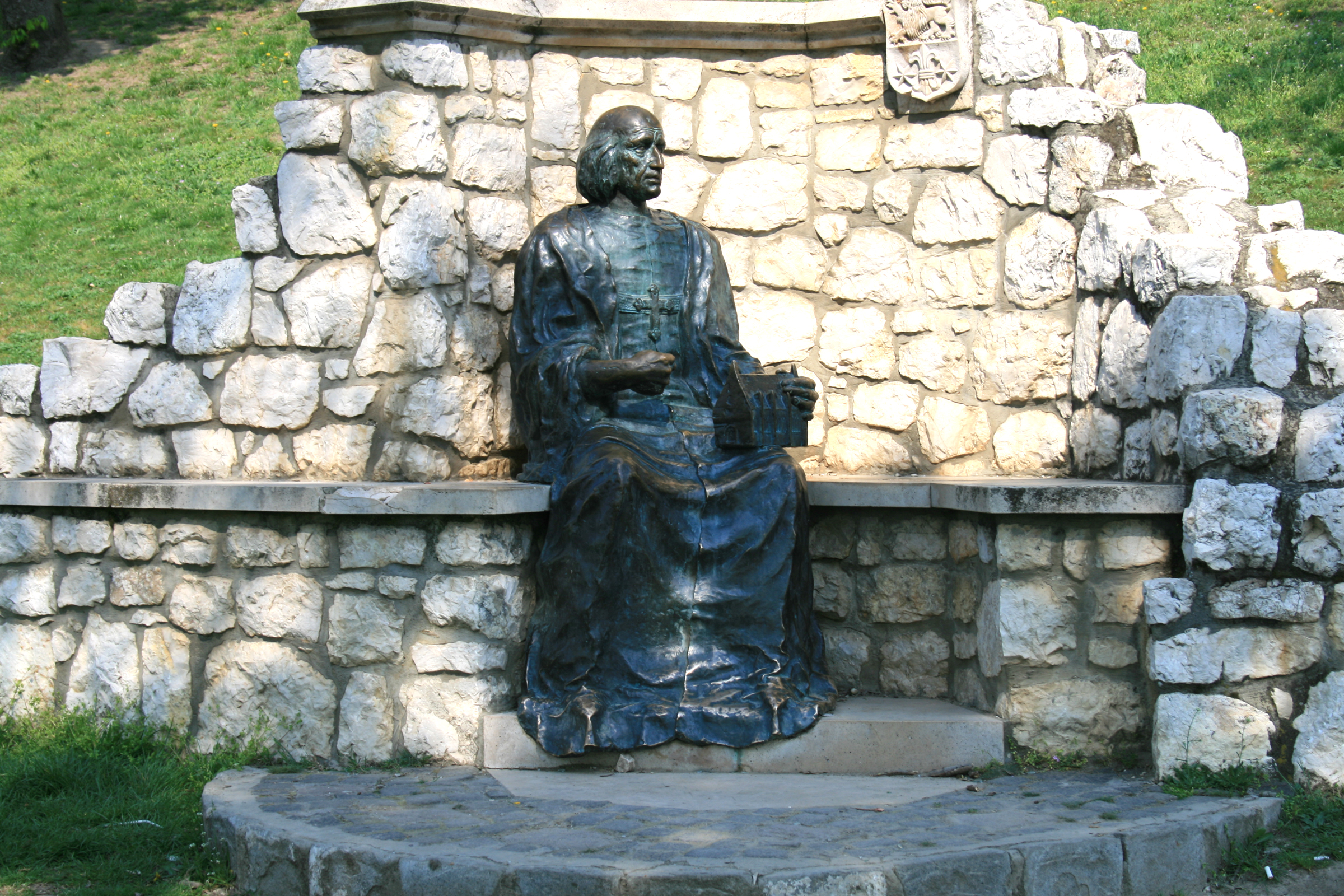
Statue in Esztergom

Catholic Church titles
Preceded by John de Dominis	Bishop of Várad; 1445–1465	Succeeded by Johann Beckenschlager
Preceded by Dénes Szécsi	Archbishop of Esztergom; 1465-1472	Succeeded by Johann Beckenschlager
