= Universitas Istropolitana =

Coordinates: 48°08′32″N 17°06′23″E

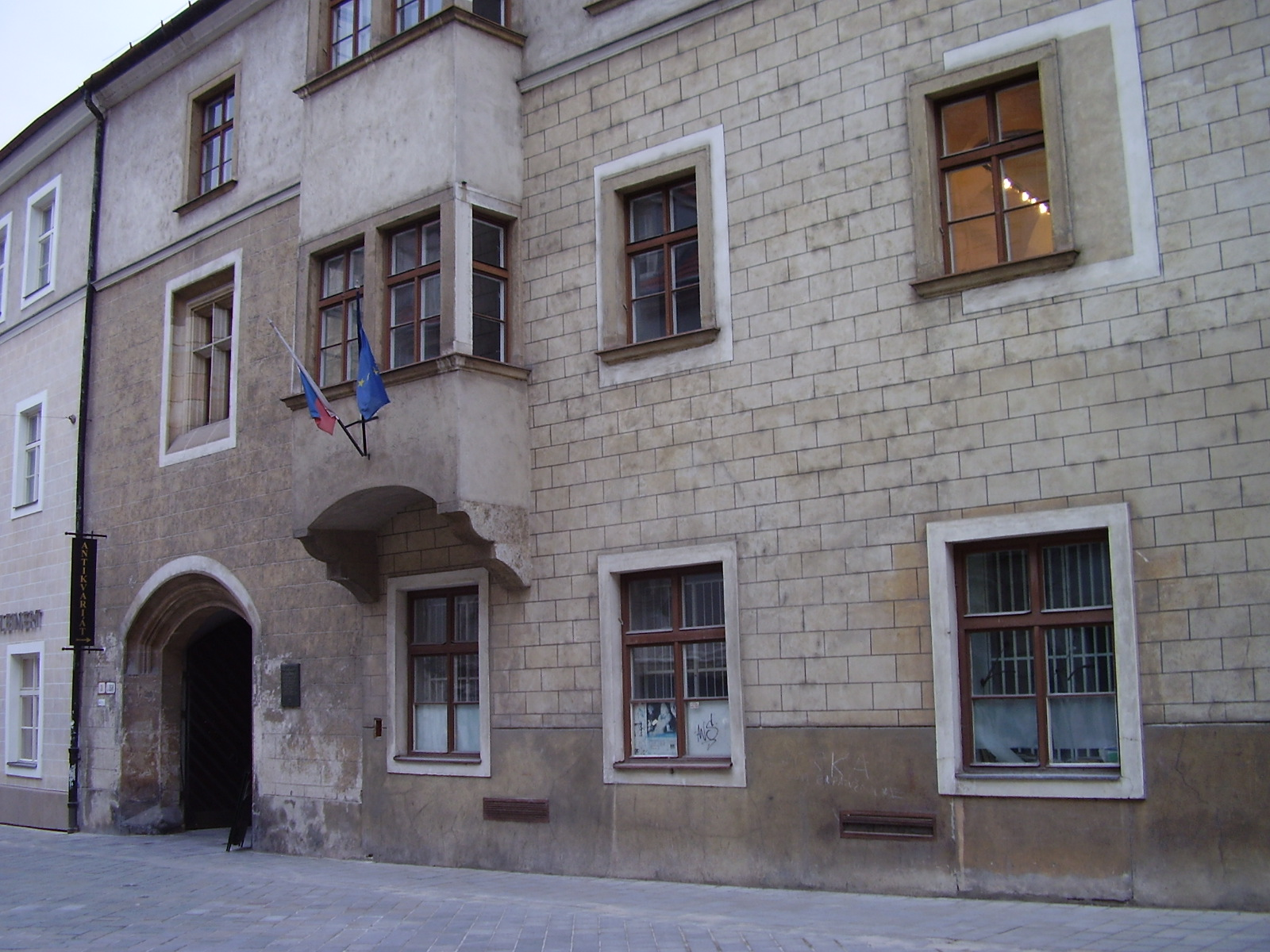
- Former university building in present-day Bratislava
- Active: 1465–1491
- Founders: Pope Paul II, at the request of King Matthias Corvinus

The Universitas Istropolitana (since the 16th century frequently – but incorrectly – referred to as Academia Istropolitana) in Bratislava (Hungarian: Pozsony / German: Pressburg) was arguably the third university to be found in the Kingdom of Hungary and the first university to be founded in the territory of present-day Slovakia. Despite its brief existence (1465–1491), it features prominently in Slovak historiography.

== Name ==
The word "Istropolitana" is taken from the ancient Greek name for Bratislava, Istropolis, which means "Danube City".

== History ==
It was founded in 1465 by Pope Paul II on the request of the Hungarian king Matthias Corvinus. It was the only university in the Kingdom of Hungary at that time, although historically not the first in the kingdom. Many well-known lecturers from Austria, Italy and elsewhere taught at the school, such as Galeotto Marzio and János Vitéz. Regiomontanus served as the chair in mathematics while the court astrologer for Corvinus, Marcin Bylica, was the chair in astrology from the university's inception. The university ceased to exist around 1490 after the death of Matthias Corvinus.

== Building ==
When a wealthy local citizen Gmaitl died in 1467 and his real estate became the crown's property, king Matthias Corvinus decided to use them to house the university that was being established. The renaissance university building still stands in Bratislava, currently housing the Academy of Performing Arts in Bratislava, situated at Ventúrska street 3.

== See also ==
- List of medieval universities
