= Charlotta Roos =

Swedish medium (1771–1809)

Charlotta Roos, née Wrangel (1771–1809) was a Swedish medium.

She was the daughter of the lieutenant and noble Henrik Herman Wrangel and Fredrika Philp. In 1791, she married the rich brewer and Swedenborgianist Sven Roos (1746–1798), in and in 1803, she married her cousin, lieutenant Wilhelm Philp (1777–1808).

Roos had a reputation for being able to predict the future, which was fashionable during the reign of Gustav III of Sweden, and she made some predictions which attracted attention. In 1791, she predicted misfortune to King Gustav III, something he reportedly referred to on his death bed after the assassination by Jacob Johan Anckarström in 1792. Roos and her spouse made an attempt to profit economically on her talent. They traveled to Paris in France, where they founded a Bureau d'Esprit à sa maniére with the intention to summon spirits. In 1797, they returned to Sweden as, according to Carl Christoffer Gjörwell Sr., the spirits were not "inclined to arouse success in the now so carnal France".

Charlotta Roos and her spouse were Swedenborgian. At the birth of her son, Jean Egalité, there were a conflict with the Swedish Lutheran Church and the Roos couple as to how the son should be baptized to satisfy the needs of both the church as well as the spiritual convictions of the parents.

== See also ==
- Höffern
- Henrik Gustaf Ulfvenklou
