= Carl Adolf Boheman =

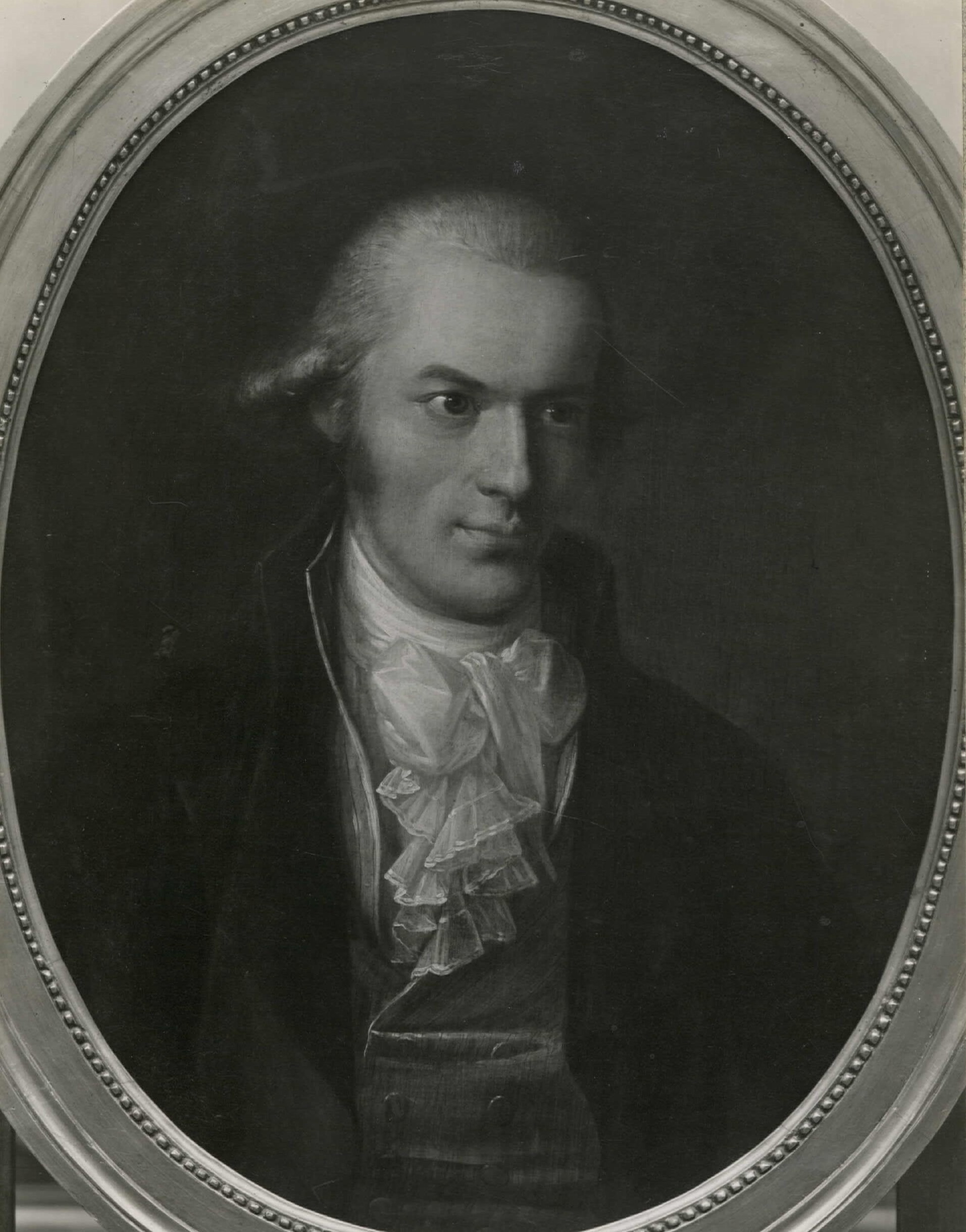

Carl Adolf Andersson Boheman (3 September 1764 – 14 April 1831) was a Swedish mystic, Freemason, merchant and royal secretary.

Boheman was born in Jönköping as the son of city Councillor Anders Bohman and Regina Katarina Schelle. Early on, he became a member of the Masonic Lodge. There is a legend that Boheman assisted count Axel von Fersen the Younger in his attempt to help the French royal family to escape during the Flight to Varennes in 1791, and that he founded a fortune by stealing the jewelry box of Marie Antoinette. This is probably without foundation.

Boheman lived in Denmark during the 1790s, where he worked for the Masonic "The Illuminati of Avignon" or D.E.L.U. (deus est lux universalis), on the commission of its grand master Prince Charles of Hesse-Kassel. As such, he visited Sweden on several occasions, during which he was presented by Gustaf Adolf Reuterholm to Duke Charles, the grand master of the Swedish Freemasons, who made him his secretary. Boheman acquired a great deal of influence upon Prince Charles and his consort, Duchess Charlotte, who were both interested in mystic and the occult. In 1802, Boheman founded the Masonic lodge Gula Rosen (Yellow Rose). This Masonic lodge was open to both sexes, and among its members he inducted, except for the prince and princess, the queen's mother Princess Amalie of Hesse-Darmstadt, count Erik Ruuth, Charlotte Wahrendorff, count Magnus Fredrik Brahe and Catharina Ulrica Koskull. In 1803, he attempted to initiate the king, Gustav IV Adolf of Sweden, which led to the Boheman Affair, which damaged the relationship between the Ducal couple and the king. Gustav IV Adolf feared Boheman, after a warning from Gustaf Mauritz Armfelt, who pointed out Boheman as a member of the Illuminati and the Yellow Rose as a society of conspirators. The King had Boheman arrested, the Duke and Duchess questioned, banned secret societies at court, forced Duke Charles to excluded Boheman from the Freemasons and had Boheman exiled for crimes against national safety. He was banished from Denmark as well and forced to continue to Germany. He returned to Sweden in 1814 and asked for compensation, but was banished again.

== See also ==
- Henrik Gustaf Ulfvenklou

== Sources ==
- My Hellsing (2013). Hovpolitik. Hedvig Elisabeth Charlotte som politisk aktör vid det gustavianska hovet. Örebro: Örebro universitet. ISBN 978-91-7668-964-6
- ”Carl Adolf Boheman”. Svenskt Biografiskt Lexikon. Stockholm: Riksarkivet. 1925. sid. 167
