= Höffern =

Höffern, von Höffer or von Hoeffer (fl. 1722), was a German noblewoman and fortune teller. She became famous in Sweden during the first half of the 18th century, where she has been called the first famous fortune teller in Stockholm.

== Life ==
She was born in a noble family in Pomerania in Germany named von Hoeffer, but in Sweden, her name was to be spelled von Höffer or simply Höffern. She moved to Sweden as a Lady's companion to a Swedish countess, Amalia Königsmarck, who lived in Germany for many years but moved back to Sweden in 1722. In Stockholm, she became an appreciated part of the aristocratic society of the Swedish capital: "This woman never made a fuss over her enlightenment, was very polite and well mannered and very loved and cherished by everyone."

Höffern was not a professional fortune teller, but she became famous for her predictions in high society, which she made of people by use of the physiognomy or by reading signs in the hands. She made several predictions which attracted attention. Among them was a prediction to King Frederick I of Sweden: "She predicted to the late King Fridric, that he would make the greatest and highest luck in the world through a woman". In Hamburg, she happened to see the hand of an officer and cried out: "Oh my, what is this hand of a poor wretch!" When the officer apologized, she replied: "You have in no way offended me, but you will soon have a great misfortune." Some weeks later, his corpse was found outside the city, apparently killed by highway robbers.

During a game of hazard, she warned countess Ascheberg of a dangerous fall: "She was as careful as ever, but still she fell in a garden upon a spot of ice and broke her hip, from which she was affected for the rest of her life; she held on to a miss Sass, but still fell and dragged her along with her."

She warned Charles Emil Lewenhaupt for hunting and rifles. Shortly afterward, he accidentally shot a hunter he mistook for a hare: "Not long after this, he created his own greatest misfortune and lost his head": Lewenhaupt was executed in 1743. Upon meeting countess Beata Elisabet Stenbock, whom she had never before met nor had been informed of, she predicted that Stenbock: "would be very lucky with sailors". The spouse of Stenbock, Carl Georg Siöblad, was made admiral in 1741 and high admiral in 1747.

Höffern and her predictions were described by Johan Wellander and kept at the National Library of Sweden.

== See also ==
- Charlotta Roos
