= Soulmother of Küssnacht =

Swiss medium and alleged witch

The Soulmother of Küssnacht (German: Seelenmutter von Küssnacht; died 1577) was a Swiss medium and an alleged witch in the city of Küssnacht in the canton of Luzern in Switzerland.

In 1573 the priests of Luzern sent a formal complaint to the bishop of Konstanz about the great superstitions and beliefs in wise women, the occult and such. They pointed out one of these occultists, the very center of all superstition they disliked: a woman known as "The Soulmother" or "The mother of souls" in Küssnacht. Her case is a known example of a witch trial toward a medium.

== Activity as a medium ==
This woman, whose real name is not known, had, for a period of thirteen years since 1560, a lucrative business as a medium. It is said that when someone died the mourners ran to the Soulmother, who had visions and could speak to the dead and tell the mourners how to set the dead to rest. Through the spirits with whom she spoke she received news from the other world about what the customers asked her about and then recommended what they should do. When the customers arrived, she could tell them what they wanted before they had the time to state their business, and then she consulted the spirits during the following nights, while the clients stayed the night at the boarding-house of her companion, Verena Lifibach.

When she summoned a spirit, she measured the windows and the doors with thread, holy water and palms were placed out, if it was Saturday, a circle was drawn out, and then with fifteen words "out of the sacrifice of Jesus Christ", the spirit was summoned. According to her assistant Riss, the good spirits were white, the evil ones yellow.

The Soulmother received visitors every day and had a very lucrative business. Her reputation had been damaged lately during a consultation when she claimed she saw a missing man as dead, after which he returned alive to his home six months later.

== Witch trial ==
The bishop of Konstanz contacted the governments of Luzern and Schwyz, and she was put before the council of Schwyz for her "non Christian fantasies". The court first thought the accusations were slander. But after having questioned her, they dealt swiftly with her. She was tortured to confess to witchcraft. Although she tried to claim that she was not as dangerous as a known alleged witch, the so-called Die Sagerin, she was judged guilty. She was burned alive at the stake in November 1577.

Verena Liefbach was banished, and assistant Riss, who seems to have been released, was arrested again a couple of years later accused of claiming to be able to tell the cause of a miscarriage or stillbirth by burning the hair of the dead infant in the light of a candle: if it was human, the hair turned blue when it burned, if it was a spirit, the hair turned black.

== See also ==
- Anna Göldi
- Eva Roller
