= George Cecil Jones =

English chemist and occultist

George Cecil Jones, Jr. (10 January 1873 – 30 October 1960), was an English chemist, occultist, one time member of the Hermetic Order of the Golden Dawn and co-founder of the magical order A∴A∴. According to author and occultist Aleister Crowley, Jones lived for some time in Basingstoke, Hampshire, England, working at a metallurgy there.

== Early life and education ==
Born in Croydon, Jones was educated at City of London School, Central Technical College and Birmingham University. He was the son of George Cecil Jones, Sr. He studied analytical chemistry at Central Technical College in South Kensington and Birmingham University and became employed in the profession upon graduation.

== Magical career ==
On 12 July 1895, Jones became a member of the Hermetic Order of the Golden Dawn. He is perhaps best known for the pivotal role he played in the life of British Aleister Crowley, stoking Crowley's youthful enthusiasm for magick.

On 25 January 1905, Jones married Ethel Melinda Baker at Balham. She was the sister of Golden Dawn member Julian Levett Baker, who had introduced Crowley to Jones. Jones introduced Crowley to the Golden Dawn, in which Jones was known by the Latin magical motto Volo Noscere ("I want knowledge").

In 1906 Jones and Crowley founded the A∴A∴, taking some of the lessons from their experiences with the Golden Dawn as well as the teachings of Crowley's The Book of the Law, and incorporating them into their new order, which Crowley would head. Jones also contributed to Crowley's book of essays on and references for Qabalah, 777 and other Qabalistic writings. In 1911 he unsuccessfully sued a newspaper, the Looking Glass, for libellously associating him with Crowley.

Jones retired as a chemist in 1939.

== Personal life ==
In the 1950s Jones and his wife, Ethel Melinda Baker, were living at 14 Elphinstone Road, Hastings. His wife died on 4 January 1952 at Hastings. He died on 30 October 1960 at St. Helens Hospital in Hastings. They had at least two children: Eileen Cecil Jones (b. 1906) and George Alan Jones (b. 1910).
