= Chic Cicero =

American occult writer (b. 1936)

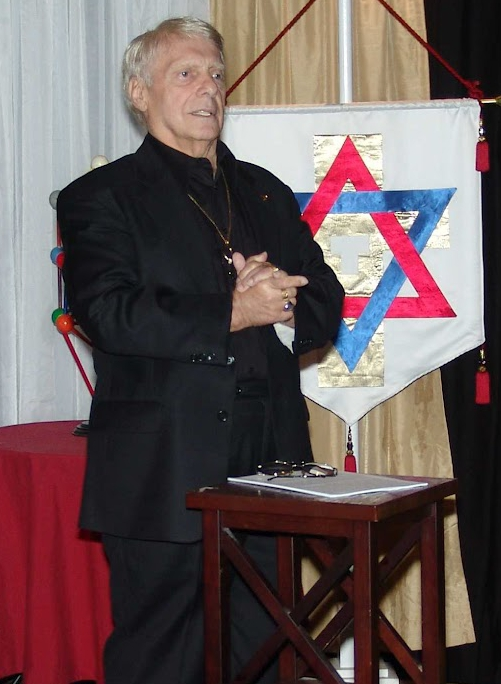
Charles "Chic" Cicero

Charles "Chic" Cicero (born 1936) is an American esoteric writer. He was born in Buffalo, New York. He has been a practicing ceremonial magician for the past forty years.

Cicero's interest in Freemasonry and the Western mystery tradition resulted in research articles on Rosicrucianism and the Knights Templar, printed in such publications as Ars Quatuor Coronatorum and the 1996–2000 Transactions of the Metropolitan College of the SRIA. Cicero is a member of several Masonic, Martinist, and Rosicrucian organizations. Cicero is an extremely active member of his local York Rite and Grand York Rite Masonic Bodies, serving as both a Local and Grand Line Officer

== Israel Regardie and the Golden Dawn ==
According to published accounts, Cicero was also a close personal friend and confidant of the late Dr. Israel Regardie. Having established a temple in the tradition of the Hermetic Order of the Golden Dawn in 1977, Cicero was one of the key people who helped Regardie resurrect a legitimate, initiatory branch of the Order (also known as H.O.G.D.) in the United States in the early 1980s. A series of letters that Regardie wrote to Chic Cicero and the Isis-Urania temple can be found online. Chic is also the president of The Hermetic Order of the Golden Dawn, Inc.

Together, Cicero and his wife Sandra Tabatha Cicero are two of the G.H. Chiefs of the modern day Order. They have written several books on the Golden Dawn, Tarot, Kabbalah, and the Western mystery tradition including the Essential Golden Dawn, which won a COVR award in 2004 for being one of the year's best titles in the field of magic.

The Ciceros have also edited, annotated and added new material to recent editions of Israel Regardie's classic texts: The Middle Pillar, A Garden of Pomegranates, and The Tree of Life.

The Ciceros have given interviews on a local TV station in Albuquerque, New Mexico.

== Bibliography ==
=== Books ===
- The New Golden Dawn Ritual Tarot. Cicero, Chic and Tabatha (1991). St. Paul, MN: Llewellyn Publications, ISBN 0-87542-139-3
- Self-Initiation into the Golden Dawn Tradition. Cicero, Chic and Tabatha (1995). St. Paul, MN: Llewellyn Publications, ISBN 1-56718-136-8
- Experiencing the Kabbalah. Cicero, Chic and Tabatha (1997). St. Paul, MN: Llewellyn Publications, ISBN 1-56718-138-4
- The Magical Pantheons. Cicero, Chic and Tabatha (1998). St. Paul, MN: Llewellyn Publications, ISBN 1-56718-861-3
- Creating Magical Tools. Cicero, Chic and Tabatha (1999). St. Paul, MN: Llewellyn Publications, ISBN 1-56718-142-2
- Ritual Use of Magical Tools. Cicero, Chic and Tabatha (2000). St. Paul, MN: Llewellyn Publications, ISBN 1-56718-143-0
- The Golden Dawn Magical Tarot. Cicero, Chic and Tabatha (2001). St. Paul, MN: Llewellyn Publications, ISBN 1-56718-125-2
- The Essential Golden Dawn: An Introduction to High Magic. Cicero, Chic and Tabatha (2003). St. Paul, MN: Llewellyn Publications, ISBN 0-7387-0310-9
- Secrets of a Golden Dawn Temple. Cicero, Chic and Tabatha (2004). Great Britain: Thoth, ISBN 1-870450-64-7
- Tarot Talismans. Cicero, Chic and Tabatha (2006). Woodbury, MN: Llewellyn Publications, ISBN 978-0-7387-0871-3
- Basics of Magic: The Best of the Golden Dawn Journal: Book I: Divination. Cicero, Chic and Tabatha (2007). Elfers, FL: H.O.G.D. Books, ISBN 978-0-9795177-0-9
- Golden Dawn Magic: A Complete Guide to the High Magical Arts. Cicero, Chic and Tabatha (2019). Woodbury, MN: Llewellyn Publications, ISBN 0-7387-5788-8
- Golden Dawn Rituals: Rites and Ceremonies for Groups and Solo Magicians. Cicero, Chic and Tabatha (2025). Woodbury, MN: Llewellyn Publications, ISBN 0-7387-7926-1

=== Other ===
- The Golden Dawn Journal Series
- The Golden Dawn Enochian Skrying Tarot(co-authored with Bill & Judi Genaw)
