= Sam Webster (writer) =

American occult writer

Sam Webster is an American writer, founder of Concrescent Press, and an advocate for open source religion—the use of the open source paradigm in the field of spirituality. He is a Thelemite, a member of the Golden Dawn tradition, Bishop Tau Ty of Ecclesia Gnostica Universalis (Universal Gnostic Church), and an initiate of Wicca.

== Education ==
Webster holds a Master of Divinity degree from the Starr King School for the Ministry at the Graduate Theological Union in Berkeley, California. He advocates open source religion—the use of the open source paradigm in the field of spirituality.

== Career ==
Webster is a Thelemite, a member of the Golden Dawn tradition, and Bishop Tau Ty of Ecclesia Gnostica Universalis, as well as an initiate of Wicca. He has founded or cofounded several occult and Pagan organizations, including the Chthonic Auranian Templars of Thelema (1985) and the Open Source Order of the Golden Dawn (2002).

Webster has written a number of articles and essays on occult and pagan topics, publishing both online and in modern pagan periodicals including Green Egg, Mezlim, Gnosis and PanGaea. Many of his essays on pagan dharma and Thelema have been made available online. In 2001, he was one of a number of Neopagans interviewed in Modern Pagans - An Investigation of Contemporary Pagan Ritual, a feature article in the counter-cultural journal RE/Search.

Concrescent Press published his book Tantric Thelema in January 2010.

== Works ==
Books

- Tantric Thelema. Concrescent Press. 2010. ISBN 978-0-9843729-0-4.

Articles

- Constellation, 1984.
- Abyss and Back, 1988.
- A metaphor is something like a bucket, 1988.
- What's Crowley got to do with Thelema, Anyway?, 1988.
- The Rite of the Milk of the Stars, 1990.
- "The Spell of Ra-Hoor-Khuit" in Mezlim, Beltane 1990.
- "The House of Khabs" in Mezlim, Samhain, 1991.
- The Star Child, 1991.
- Process in the Symbolic Re-Creation of the World, 1992.
- Rite of Passage Structure in the Japanese Accession Ceremonies, 1992.
- Changing Society through Ritual, 1993.
- What is Polytheism and how I became Polytheistic, 1993.
- "Working Polytheism" in Gnosis #28, Spring 1993.Home
- The World as Lover Working, 1993.
- "Structural Implications in the Sepherot", 1994.
- "Pagan Dharma" in Gnosis #39, Spring, 1996.Home
- The Bones of Sex and Spirit, 1996.
- "Why I call Myself Pagan", 1999 in Reclaiming Quarterly The Spiral Dance - History and Traditions
- "Pagan Dharma 2" in PanGaea, 1999.
- A Thelemic Ganachakra, 2001. (see Ganachakra)
- Entering the Buddhadharma, 2002.OSOGD: Library: Entering the Buddhadharma
- Preliminary notes towards an understanding of the Neophyte Hall in the Open Source Order of the Golden Dawn., 2002.OSOGD: Library: Y Documents: Understanding the Neophyte Hall
- Towards a General Theory of Divination, 2002. The Open Source Order of the Golden Dawn
- Ritual, Magick & How Pagans will Save the World, 2004.
- The Pagan Agenda, 2005.

== Notes ==
Other sources

- "Sam Webster". Free Encyclopedia of Thelema. 2006. Archived from the original on December 1, 2008.
