= Golden Dawn (band) =

Austrian metal band

- Origin: Austria
- Genres: Black metal, Extreme gothic metal
- Years active: 1992 – present
- Labels: Beverina; Casus Belli; Dark Matter; Impure Creations; Iron Bonehead; Irond; Napalm; Non Serviam; Scarecrow; Seance; Seedstock; Tour De Garde; Valentine Sound
- Members: Stefan Traunmüller; Karim Kienzle; Sebastian Reiter; Moritz Neuner

Golden Dawn is an Austrian band formed by Stefan Traunmüller as a one-man black metal project in 1992. It attracted the attention of Ray Wells of Pazuzu and Martin Schirenc of Pungent Stench and Hollenthon, which led to a compilation appearance and a contract with Dark Matter Records.

Traunmüller recorded his debut album, The Art of Dreaming, as a one-man band with session musicians Thomas Tannenberger of Abigor and Martin Schirenc.

Dark Matter folded. Seven years later recorded Masquerade for Napalm Records.

In January 2012, Return To Provenance was released on Non Serviam Records. In 2018, the band released a split with The Negative Bias via Casus Belli Musica and Beverina Productions.

== Members ==
- Stefan Traunmüller - vocals, keyboard
- Karim Kienzle - guitar
- Sebastian Reiter - guitar, bass
- Moritz Neuner - drums

== Discography ==
- Rehearsal 1994 (1994, Seedstock Records)
- Way of the Sorcerer (1995)
- Split Demo 95 split with Apeiron (1995, Impure Creations Records / Seedstock Records)
- Lullaby (1995 Seedstock Records / Iron Bonehead Productions)
- The Art of Dreaming (1996, Dark Matter Records / Valentine Sound Productions / Napalm Records / Beverina Productions / Casus Belli Musica)
- Masquerade (2003, Napalm Records / Scarecrow Records / Irond Records)
- Return to Provenance (2012, Non Serviam Records)
- Lullaby / Way of the Sorcerer (2017, Iron Bonehead Productions / Tour De Garde)
- Early Obscurity... Part 1 (2017, Beverina Productions)
- Early Obscurity... Part 2 (2017, Beverina Productions)
- The Temple of Cruel Empathy / Lunar Serpent split with The Negative Bias (2018, Beverina Productions / Casus Belli Musica / Seance Records)
