= Sandra Tabatha Cicero =

American esoteric writer and lecturer

Sandra Tabatha Cicero is an American esoteric writer and lecturer, best known for her work in the field of Hermeticism.

== Early life ==
Born in rural Wisconsin in 1959, Cicero graduated from the University of Wisconsin–Milwaukee with a Bachelor's Degree in Fine Arts in 1982. She worked as an entertainer, typesetter, editor, commercial artist, and computer graphics illustrator. She met her husband Chic Cicero in the early 1980s.

== Writings ==
Along with her husband, Cicero has co-authored several books on the Golden Dawn, Tarot, Kabbalah, and the Western mystery tradition including The Essential Golden Dawn, which won a Coalition of Visionary Resources (COVR) award in 2004 as one of the year's best titles in the field of magic. Together, the Ciceros have edited, annotated and added new material to recent editions of classic magical texts by Israel Regardie, including The Middle Pillar, A Garden of Pomegranates, The Philosopher's Stone, and The Tree of Life. At the encouragement of Israel Regardie she painted "The Golden Dawn Magical Tarot".

== The Golden Dawn ==
Cicero is a Rosicrucian and a Martinist, as well as the current Imperatrix of the Societas Rosicruciana in America (SRIAm). She was initiated into a modern Order in the tradition of the Hermetic Order of the Golden Dawn in 1983.

Together, Cicero and her husband are two of the G.H. Chiefs of the contemporary Order of the same name, which does not claim institutional lineage to the original Hermetic Order of the Golden Dawn but it does claim initiatory lineage through Israel Regardie.

In interviews and various writings, the Ciceros themselves have acknowledged that their group, H.O.G.D., does not claim an unbroken lineage to the original Hermetic Order of the Golden Dawn. Instead, they emphasize that their work is based on the teachings preserved and expanded by Israel Regardie, who made the original Golden Dawn's material publicly accessible and personally consecrated their Temple and their Work. The Ciceros explain that the Golden Dawn's original temples were either destroyed or disbanded and that what remains today is a modern reconstruction based on the original material.

On the nature, purpose and question of lineage the Cicero‘s have written: “Questions of legitimacy or lineage of a magical group can in fact interfere with spiritual growth if a student becomes caught up with the glamour of obtaining a magical merit badge from a recognized organization, rather than achieving conversation with one’s Higher and Divine Genius. Empty gestures and hollow proclamations of high degrees and titles mean little or nothing to one’s own Higher Self. The will and the determination to achieve union with the Divine are the only essential factors in proceeding on the path of an Initiate. One need not be a member of any acknowledged organization to do it.“

== Bibliography ==
=== Books ===
- The New Golden Dawn Ritual Tarot. Cicero, Chic and Tabatha (1991). St. Paul, MN: Llewellyn Publications, ISBN 0-87542-139-3
- Self-Initiation into the Golden Dawn Tradition. Cicero, Chic and Tabatha (1995). St. Paul, MN: Llewellyn Publications, ISBN 1-56718-136-8
- Experiencing the Kabbalah. Cicero, Chic and Tabatha (1997). St. Paul, MN: Llewellyn Publications, ISBN 1-56718-138-4
- Creating Magical Tools. Cicero, Chic and Tabatha (1999). St. Paul, MN: Llewellyn Publications, ISBN 1-56718-142-2
- Ritual Use of Magical Tools. Cicero, Chic and Tabatha (2000). St. Paul, MN: Llewellyn Publications, ISBN 1-56718-143-0
- The Golden Dawn Magical Tarot. Cicero, Chic and Tabatha (2001). St. Paul, MN: Llewellyn Publications, ISBN 1-56718-125-2
- The Essential Golden Dawn. Cicero, Chic and Tabatha (2003). St. Paul, MN: Llewellyn Publications, ISBN 0-7387-0310-9
- Secrets of a Golden Dawn Temple. Cicero, Chic and Tabatha (2004). Great Britain: Thoth, ISBN 1-870450-64-7
- Tarot Talismans. Cicero, Chic and Tabatha (2006). Woodbury, MN: Llewellyn Publications, ISBN 978-0-7387-0871-3
- The Babylonian Tarot. Cicero, Sandra Tabatha. The Babylonian Tarot. (2006) Woodbury, MN: Llewellyn Publications, ISBN 0-7387-0716-3
- The Book of the Concourse of the Watchtowers. Cicero, Sandra Tabatha. (2012) Elfers, FL: HOGD Books, ISBN 0-9795177-1-0
- Golden Dawn Magic: A Complete Guide to the High Magical Arts. Cicero, Chic and Tabatha (2019). Woodbury, MN: Llewellyn Publications, ISBN 0-7387-5788-8
- Golden Dawn Rituals: Rites and Ceremonies for Groups and Solo Magicians. Cicero, Chic and Tabatha (2025). Woodbury, MN: Llewellyn Publications, ISBN 0-7387-7926-1

=== Other ===
- The Golden Dawn Journal: Book I: Divination. Cicero, Chic and Tabatha (1994). St. Paul, MN: Llewellyn Publications, ISBN 1-56718-850-8
- The Golden Dawn Journal: Book II: Qabalah. Cicero, Chic and Tabatha (1994). St. Paul, MN: Llewellyn Publications, ISBN 1-56718-851-6
- The Golden Dawn Journal: Book III: The Art of Hermes. Cicero, Chic and Tabatha (1995). St. Paul, MN: Llewellyn Publications, ISBN 1-56718-852-4
- The Magical Pantheons: A Golden Dawn Journal. Cicero, Chic and Tabatha (1998). St. Paul, MN: Llewellyn Publications, ISBN 1-56718-861-3
- The Golden Dawn Enochian Skrying Tarot(co-authored with Bill & Judi Genaw)(2004). St. Paul, MN: Llewellyn Publications, ISBN 0-7387-0201-3
- Basics of Magic: The Best of the Golden Dawn Journal: Book I; Divination(2007). Elfers, FL: H.O.G.D. Books, ISBN 978-0-9795177-0-9
