= Open Source Order of the Golden Dawn =

Magical organization

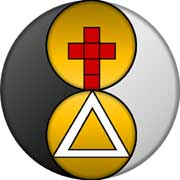
The Seal of the OSOGD

The Open Source Order of the Golden Dawn (OSOGD) was an esoteric community of magical practitioners, many of whom came from pagan backgrounds. It was an initiatory teaching Order that drew upon the knowledge, experience, practices, and spirit of the system of magical training and attainment developed by the original Hermetic Order of the Golden Dawn. The OSOGD ceased operating in September 2019.

== History ==
The OSOGD was founded by Sam Webster in 2002 and is based on the principles of the open-source software movement. The organization grew out of a series of workshops on ceremonial magic held by Webster in 2001.

According to Sam Webster,

The Open Source Order was founded on the principle that true spirituality is omnipresent and access to it cannot be owned or controlled by any group or individual. Sufficiently skilled practitioners can and do modify the practices to serve specific purposes or to take advantage of the century-plus development in the craft to improve their effect.

According to The Manifesto of the Open Source Order of the Golden Dawn, the Order had undertaken to revise the teachings of the original Victorian era Hermetic Order of the Golden Dawn system to work more effectively in the 21st century. This redaction of the original rituals has taken on the aspect of some principles, listed in the Manifesto as Open Source Magick, New Aeon, Freedom of Information, Thelema, Duty, Universalism, and Form and Function.

In temple work, the OSOGD used Egyptian, Enochian, and Thelemic godforms in preference to the Judeo-Christian archangels typical of the original Hermetic Order of the Golden Dawn. According to the Manifesto, OSOGD teaches "a progressively tiered system of spiritual development designed to invoke the Higher or Divine Genius latent in every human being".

== Membership ==
To actually join the Order, a person must have had regular access to its Lodge, which was located in the San Francisco Bay Area. The Order did not conduct distance initiations and required that all initiates attend initiation rituals in person.

== Influences ==
The Open Source Order of the Golden Dawn drew heavily from Eastern sources, Thelema, Paganism, and the works of Aleister Crowley.

== See also ==
- Open-source religion
