= Henrik Gustaf Ulfvenklou =

Swedish mystic and medium

Henrik Gustaf Ulfvenklou (1756–28 September 1819), was a Swedish mystic and medium who gained a great influence in the circles of Charles XIII of Sweden by claiming to communicate with the spirits of the dead.

Lieutenant Ulfenklou arrived in Stockholm in 1783, where he made success in the esoteric circle around Duke Charles. He claimed he stood in contact with the duke's dead mother, Louisa Ulrika of Prussia, whose spirit he sent to observe Charles's brother the king, Gustav III of Sweden, who was in Italy at that time (1784). He sent a warning with a prediction to Gustav, which is said to have caused damage in the relationship between Charles and Gustav. Reuterholm disliked him and had him sent away, and when he returned in 1785, Reuterholm was to have "exposed" him to Charles. His public career then ended, but he continued to have influence over Charles through correspondence.

== See also ==
- Ulrica Arfvidsson
- Karl Adolf Boheman
