= Gerald Suster =

- Born: 2 August 1951; Hampstead, London, England
- Died: 3 February 2001 (aged 49); London, England
- Occupation: Historian

Gerald Suster (2 August 1951 – 3 February 2001) was a British revisionist historian, occult writer, and novelist. He was best known for his biographies of Aleister Crowley (The Legacy of the Beast) and Israel Regardie (Crowley's Apprentice).

== Family life ==
Suster was born 2 August 1951 in Hampstead, London, and was educated at Highgate School and Trinity Hall, Cambridge.

Suster's father, Ilya Suster, an entrepreneur in the egg products industry, was born Ilya Shusterovich in Harbin, Manchuria on 17 October 1914, grew up in Hamburg, Germany, and emigrated with his family to the United Kingdom in 1938.

Gerald Suster was married twice, in 1975 to Ann Nash (marriage dissolved) and in 1992 to Michaela Antonina Duncan (1948–2001).

== Occult activities ==
While working in California Gerald Suster met Israel Regardie and Gerald Yorke, two of the few remaining occultists who had studied directly under Aleister Crowley. Suster made great progress in A∴A∴, and became a well-known figure in the London occult and pagan scenes. He prefaced every speech & comment with the words: "Do what thou wilt shall be the whole of the Law"; the immediate source of the utterance is the Book of the Law.

In 1989 he became a tutor at Boarzell Tutorial College in Sussex; however his teaching career came to an abrupt end when he was featured in an exposé of his occult activities in the News of the World newspaper on 16 April 1989. Suster sued the paper for libel, citing extensive damage to his livelihood arising from the article and various lies by the reporter Chris Blythe. News International paid £10,000 into court; Suster accepted the offer and got £80,000 of costs from them. After the case, Gerald Suster & his new wife went on honeymoon to Madrid. On their return, he focused on being a full-time author, producing books of biography, occultism, and erotica. He called his new occupation "my most productive period of creative writing".

Suster died on 3 February 2001 in London. The Suster family buried the body in the ground of the local Anglican church. The Central London Pagan Scene held a goetic memorial for him in the upper room of The Princess Louise in Holborn, one of Suster's long-time haunts.

== Bibliography ==
=== Fiction ===
- The Devil's Maze (1979)
- The Elect (1980)
- The Scar (1981)
- The Offering (1982)
- The Victim - as George Scarman (1982)
- The Block (1983)
- Stryker (1984)
- The Force (1984)
- The Handyman (1985)
- The God Game (1986)
- The Labyrinth of Satan (1997)

=== Non-fiction ===
- Hitler and the Age of Horus (1981; in the United States as: Hitler: The Occult Messiah)
- John Dee: Essential Readings (1986)
- Hitler: Black Magician (1987)
- The Legacy of the Beast: The Life, Work, and Influence of Aleister Crowley (1988)
- Crowley's Apprentice: The Life and Ideas of Israel Regardie (1989)
- Champions of the Ring: The Lives and Times of Boxing's Heavyweight Heroes (1992)
- Lightning Strikes: The Lives and Times of Boxing's Lightweight Heroes (1994)
- The Truth About the Tarot: A Manual of Practice and Theory (1996)
- The Generals: The Best and Worst Military Commanders (1997)
- The Hell-Fire Friars: Sex, Politics & Religion (2000)

=== Erotica ===
- The Black Pearl: Memoirs of a Victorian Sex-Magician Volume 1 - as Anonymous (1995)
- The Black Pearl: Memoirs of a Victorian Sex-Magician Volume 2 - as Anonymous (1995)
- The Black Pearl: Memoirs of a Victorian Sex-Magician Volume 3 - as Anonymous (1995)
- The Secret Sutras: The 'Lost' Erotic Journals of Sir Richard Burton - as Marcus Ardonne, PhD and Sir Richard Burton (1996)
- Arena of Lust - as Marcus Ardonne, PhD and Sextus Propertius (1996)
- Unholy Passions - as Anonymous (1997)
- Vixens - as Alan Dale (1997)
- The Black Pearl: Memoirs of a Victorian Sex-Magician Volume 4 - as Anonymous (1998)
- Sexploited - as Alan Dale (1998)
- Gothic Passions - as Anonymous (1998)
- Wolverines - as Alan Dale (1998)
