= Johannes Lauratius de Fundis =

Johannes Paulus Lauratius de Fundis (fl. 1428 – c. 1473) was a medieval astronomer and professor of astrology in Bologna. He is known for several manuscript works including Tractatus reprobationis eorum que scripsit Nicolaus Orrem (1451) and Nova theorica planetarum.

Johannes Lauratius (or Paulus) de Fundis lectured in astrology at the University of Bologna between 1428 and 1473. He made original astronomical observations including that of Mars in 1843. He wrote several commentaries and tracts including Tacuinus astromico-medicus (1435), Questio de fine sec durabilitate mundi (1445), Nova spera materialis (1456), and Tractatus reprobacionis eorum que scripsit Nicolaus Orrem (1451). The last being a defense of astrology to counter the claims of Nicole Oresme. For events on the earth, he blamed both the sky and princes but claimed that princes could resist the influence of the stars. His major work however was Nova theorica planetarum (incipit, “Theorica speculativa dicitur scientia motuum planetarum”) which was made before 1456 and meant to be an improvement on the ideas of the thirteenth century Theorica planetarum ascribed to a Gerard (either of Cremona or of Sabioneta) or the De sphaera mundi of Johannes de Sacrobosco.
