= Israel Regardie =

English occultist 1907–1985)

- A promotional image of Israel Regardie
- Born: Francis Israel Regudy; 17 November 1907; London, England
- Died: 10 March 1985 (aged 77); Sedona, Arizona, US
- Education: Doctor of Chiropractic
- Alma mater: Chiropractic College of New York
- Occupations: Occultist and writer
- Known for: Stella Matutina

Francis Israel Regardie (/rɪˈɡɑːrdi/; né Regudy; 17 November 1907 – 10 March 1985) was an English and American occultist, ceremonial magician, and writer who spent much of his life in the United States. He wrote fifteen books on the subject of occultism.

Born to a working-class Orthodox Jewish family in the East End of London, Regardie and his family soon moved to Washington, D.C., in the United States. Regardie rejected Orthodox Judaism during his teenage years and took an interest in Theosophy, Hinduism, Buddhism, and Jewish mysticism. It was through his interest in yoga that he encountered the writings of the occultist Aleister Crowley. Contacting Crowley, he was invited to serve as the occultist's secretary, necessitating a move to Paris, France in 1928. He followed Crowley to England before their association ended. Living in England, he wrote two books on the Qabalah, A Garden of Pomegranates and The Tree of Life. In 1934 he then joined the Stella Matutina—a ceremonial magic order descended from the defunct Hermetic Order of the Golden Dawn—but grew dissatisfied with its leadership and left. He also studied psychology, being particularly influenced by ideas from Jungian psychology, and explored Christian mysticism.

In 1937 he returned to the United States. Concerned that the Golden Dawn system of ceremonial magic would be lost, he published the Stella Matutina rituals in a series of books between 1938 and 1940. This entailed breaking his oath of secrecy and brought anger from many other occultists. During the Second World War he served in the U.S. Army. On returning to the U.S., he gained a doctorate in psychology before relocating to Los Angeles in 1947 and setting up practice as a chiropractor. In 1981 he retired and moved to Sedona, Arizona, where he died of a heart attack four years later.

== Biography ==
=== Early life: 1907–1931 ===
Regardie was born Israel Regudy on 17 November 1907 off of the Mile End Road in London's East End, then a poor area. His parents, Barnet Regudy, a cigarette maker, and Phoebe Perry, were poor Orthodox Jewish immigrants from Zhitomir, Russian Empire (present-day Ukraine). His family changed their surname to "Regardie" after a clerical mixup resulted in Israel's elder brother being enrolled in the British Army under that name. Regardie emigrated with his parents to the United States in August 1921 and settled in Washington, D.C. Regardie's parents believed that the Talmudic stories were literally true. With a Hebrew tutor he gained a linguistic knowledge which would prove invaluable in his later studies of Hermetic Qabalah. In his teenage years, Regardie rejected this parental faith. He began reading the work of Helena Blavatsky, the founder of Theosophy. From there, he read Hindu texts like the Upanishads and the Bhagavad Gita as well as Buddhist texts like the Dhammapada and the Milinda Panha.

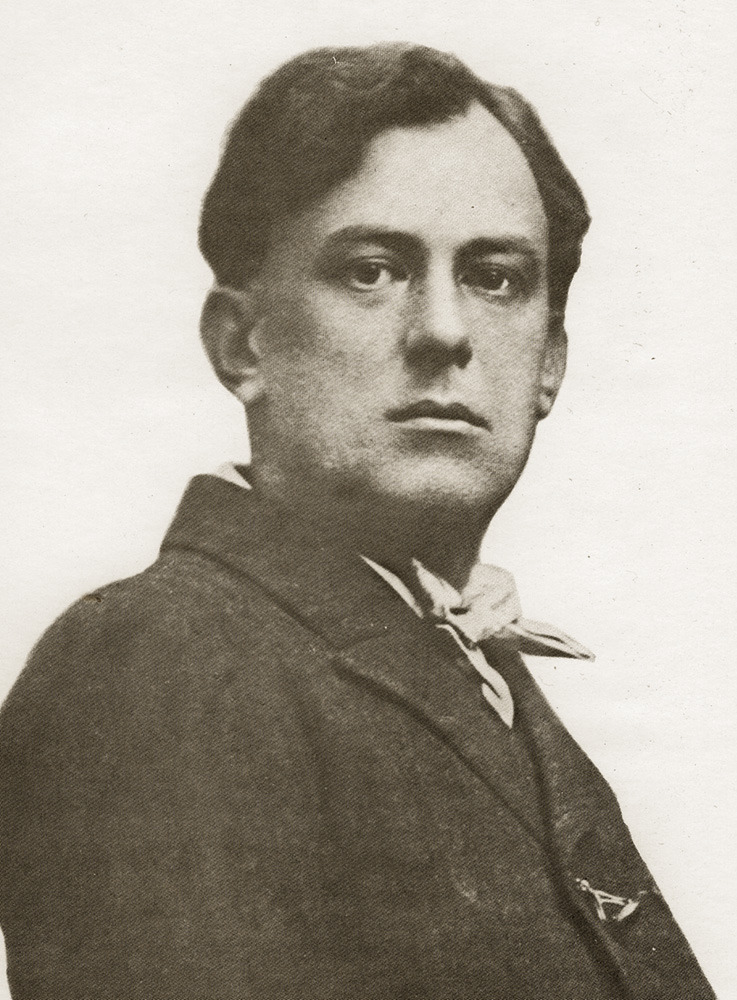
Regardie became secretary for Aleister Crowley

Interested in becoming a painter, he studied at an art school in Philadelphia. He also joined the Societas Rosicruciana in America at around this time. While in Washington, D.C., he came across a discussion of yoga in Book 4, a work by the occultist Aleister Crowley. Impressed by it, he wrote to Crowley via the latter's publisher, receiving a response eight months later. Crowley advised Regardie to meet with Karl Germer, his agent in the United States. Regardie visited Germer in New York City, where he purchased the ten issues published up to that point of Crowley's periodical, The Equinox. In March 1926 he was initiated into the 0=0 degree of the Washington College of the Societas Rosicruciana in America, subsequently being initiated into the Zelator grade in June 1927.

Through Crowley's work, Regardie moved from the practice of yoga to that of ceremonial magic. When Crowley asked Regardie to travel to Paris to serve as his personal secretary, the young man agreed; he told his parents that he would be studying with an English painter in Paris. In October 1928, Regardie sailed from New York City to Paris. Regardie hoped that Crowley would personally instruct him in occult practices, but this did not occur; Crowley expected his pupils to learn things for themselves and only seek his advice when in difficulty. Crowley urged Regardie to overcome his inhibitions, including by visiting prostitutes to lose his virginity; from one of these encounters he reportedly contracted gonorrhoea. Regardie spent much time studying Crowley's material, both published and unpublished. As a magical name, he took "Frater NChSh" ("The Serpent"), although also became known as "Father Scorpio". Through his involvement with Crowley, Regardie came to know Gerald Yorke, although the duo never became friends. Crowley would sometimes play two simultaneous games of chess, one with Regardie and the other with Yorke.

In January 1929, Regardie was hospitalised for a period. Then, in March, Regardie's sister—who had become aware of the content of Crowley's writings—contacted the French authorities to urge them to investigate what had happened to her brother. The Sûreté Générale did so, discovering that Regardie did not have an identity card permitting him residence in France. He received an expulsion notice giving him 24 hours to leave the country; Crowley was soon also ordered to leave. Regardie moved to Brussels in Belgium, where he began a relationship with Crowley's then-lover, Maria Theresa Ferrari de Miramar. Crowley had returned to England, and in late 1929 Regardie joined him there, living in Knockholt, Kent. Crowley could no longer afford to keep Regardie as his secretary and the pair parted amicably. Regardie then became secretary to the author Thomas Burke, who encouraged his own literary intentions.

=== Early literary career: 1932–1937 ===
While visiting North Devon, Regardie began writing a book on Qabalah, for which he drew upon the writings of occultists like Crowley, Éliphas Lévi, and A. E. Waite. The result, A Garden of Pomegranates, was published by Rider and Company in 1932. He dedicated the book to Crowley. He followed this with a more substantial volume on Qabalah, The Tree of Life: A Study in Magic. Among those to read the work was the occultist Dion Fortune, who considered it to be "quite the best book on magic" that she had read. She and Regardie met, but while the latter admired her writings he was unimpressed with her in person. Regardie later publicly criticised her for misrepresenting his works in her reviews of them; she had claimed that his works bolstered her beliefs about the Masters, although Regardie insisted that he was sceptical about the existence of such entities.

The publication of works on Qabalah aimed at a general audience angered some occultists who thought Regardie was sharing information too widely. As a result of the controversy, in 1934 he made contact with members of the Stella Matutina, a ceremonial magic occultist order that had branched off the since-dissolved Hermetic Order of the Golden Dawn. With Crowley's blessing, he was initiated into the group, taking on the magical name "Ad Majorem Adonai Gloriam". He rapidly progressed through the grades of the order, reaching that of Zelator Adeptus Minor, but grew disillusioned with the group's leaders, regarding them as being egotistical and preoccupied with collecting grandiose titles. He resolved to publish the group's ritual material, believing that it would ensure that the Golden Dawn ritual system was not lost and would benefit a far wider range of people; this would entail breaking the oath of secrecy he took upon entering the order. In February 1935, Regardie finished writing My Rosicrucian Adventure, which was published as What You Should Know about the Golden Dawn.

His literary endeavours brought Regardie little money and while in England he lived largely in poverty. Regardie had a growing passion for psychology and studied psychoanalysis through a Jungian framework under E. Clegg and J. L. Bendit. Although influenced by Jungian psychology, he disagreed with some of the ideas of its founder, Carl Jung, such as the idea that all humans could be classified as either introverts or extroverts, something that Regardie deemed too simplistic. He also began exploring Christian mysticism. He was particularly attracted to the figure of Francis of Assisi; he began using the name "Francis" himself after he was given it by a woman he was in a relationship with.

=== Back in the United States: 1937–1950 ===
In 1937 he decided to return to the United States after nine years abroad. Shortly after doing so, Regardie and Crowley fell out. Regardie sent Crowley a copy of his latest publication; the latter's response made fun of Regardie's use of the name "Francis", calling him "Frank", and including an anti-semitic slur. Regardie wrote an angry letter back, calling Crowley "Alice" and describing him as "a contemptible bitch". Crowley then circulated a document attacking Regardie, accusing him of exploiting his benefactors and of contracting gonorrhoea. This incident led Regardie to distance himself from occultism for several years.

In 1938 his book, The Philosopher's Stone, was published; it examined alchemy through the lens of psychology, seeking psychological interpretations for alchemical symbolism. Regardie later came to reject this understanding of alchemy, referring to it as "by far my worst book" and regretting having written it. From 1938 to 1940, Aries Press of Chicago published four volumes of Golden Dawn material edited by Regardie. It sold slowly. The historian Richard Kaczynski noted that "it quickly became a classic". For this act he was vilified by many in the occultist community, some of whom cursed him. Crowley claimed that the publication of this material was "pure theft", although he had personally published Golden Dawn ritual material himself. The published material influenced many readers, resulting in the formation of many groups that used the Golden Dawn rituals as a basis.

In the U.S., he focused his attentions on psychotherapy and especially the work of Wilhelm Reich. He studied at the Chiropractic College of New York City, graduating in 1941. After the United States joined the Second World War, Regardie joined the US Army, serving with them between 1942 and 1945. After the war he returned to the U.S. and obtained a doctorate in psychology. His interest in Reichian ideas influenced the exercises put forward in his book Be Yourself - The Art of Relaxation. He followed this work with The Middle Pillar and The Art of True Healing, in which he showcased his psychological approach to Qabalistic magical practices.

Maintaining his interest in Christian mysticism, Regardie began exploring Christian Science and New Thought, both movements that stressed the ability to heal sickness with thought. In 1946 his book on the subject, The Romance of Metaphysics, was published; it would be republished as The Teachers of Fulfilment. In 1947, Regardie moved to Los Angeles, where he set up practice as a chiropractor. For some of his clients, he also engaged in psychotherapy and used Reichian tactics to heal their ailments. This career proved a financial success, eventually earning 80,000 dollars a year. He also taught psychiatry at the Los Angeles College of Chiropractic. He contributed articles to the Psychiatric Quarterly and The American Journal of Psychotherapy.

=== Developing career: 1951–1979 ===
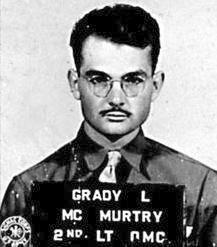
Regardie was on friendly terms with Grady McMurtry (pictured); the latter asked for Regardie's blessing before relaunching Ordo Templi Orientis

Throughout the 1950s, Regardie continued to avoid much contact with the occultist movement. He consistently avoided the public eye, refusing interviews to appear on radio and television; he was concerned that publicity would bring with it persecution. Like Crowley, Regardie was interested in mind-altering substances, and in the 1950s he experimented with using LSD under laboratory conditions.

Regardie began editing various of Crowley's writings for republication, among them Book Four, Three Holy Books, AHA!, The Vision and the Voice, The World's Tragedy, Magick without Tears, and an edited collection called The Best of Crowley. In the 1970s, The Golden Dawn volumes were republished, selling more briskly than they had on first publication.

Although he had ended his association with Crowley on bad terms, he was angered on reading the first biography of Crowley, The Great Beast by John Symonds, which he thought was unduly negative and failed to understand Crowley's beliefs. Regardie decided to write his own book about Crowley, but it took over a decade to produce. In 1970, Regardie's The Eye in the Triangle: An Interpretation of Aleister Crowley, was published. The work starts as a memoir of Regardie's time with Crowley before moving on to a biographical account of the occultist's life up till 1914. By that point, Regardie believed, Crowley had achieved everything of significance in his life. In the work, Regardie sought to balance his appreciation for Crowley with a discussion of what he saw as the man's faults. In The Eye in the Triangle, Regardie argued that Aiwass—the entity whom Crowley claimed had given him The Book of the Law in 1904—was actually a facet of Crowley's own psyche.

He also wrote other works. One was Twelve Steps to Spiritual Enlightenment, a textbook on how to practice magic that was later republished as The One Year Manual. Subsequent books, published by the UK-based Aquarian Press, included A Practical Guide to Geomantic Divination and How to Make and Use Talismans.

Regardie's works gained a growing readership in the Counterculture of the 1960s. He received correspondence from many of his readers, much of which he thought was unhinged; he collected these in a manuscript he called Liber NVTS. His house was burgled twice, with the burglars seeking to steal Golden Dawn and Crowleyan material. He befriended various occultists, including Christopher Hyatt. He also established friendly contact with the author Robert Anton Wilson, who provided an introduction for the third edition of The Eye in the Triangle. He corresponded again with Yorke, who was now a Tibetan Buddhist. He also became friends with the Thelemite Grady McMurtry, who asked for his and Yorke's approval before relaunching Ordo Templi Orientis (O.T.O.) from his Berkeley home. Regardie never joined O.T.O., but wished it well. He was also an acquaintance of the psychedelics proponent Timothy Leary.

=== Later life: 1980–1985 ===
In 1980, Regardie's Ceremonial Magic: A Guide to the Mechanisms of Ritual was published in both the UK and US. In this book, he encouraged prospective ceremonial magicians to engage in self-initiation. By the 1980s, Regardie had developed a deep dislike of Christianity. He came to believe that Jesus of Nazareth had never existed, and that the myth around him was derived from that of the ancient Egyptian god Osiris.

In 1981, Regardie began instructing a woman in the Golden Dawn system. She went on to establish a temple in Los Angeles, for which Regardie agreed to act as a consultant if they ran into difficulty. Among the group's members was Gerald Suster, later a writer on occultism. The group was damaged by personality differences and ended up in schism. In 1981, Regardie retired from his chiropractic clinic and left Los Angeles for Sedona, Arizona. In 1984, Regardie's The Complete Golden Dawn System of Magic, a book over a thousand pages long, was published.

In 1983 he visited Fiji, Australia, and New Zealand; in February 1984 he visited Hawaii and considered moving there. Regardie died from a heart attack in the presence of close friends during a dinner at a Sedona restaurant on 10 March 1985, at the age of 77. He left his money to his nephew, a lawyer in New York City. Other material was left to Christopher Hyatt, who established the Israel Regardie Foundation.

== Personal life ==
Over the course of his life, Regardie married and divorced three times; he had no children.

Regardie suffered from asthma, sometimes known as "the occultist's disease" within the occult community. Suster noted that, in old age at least, Regardie had "a most delightful sense of humour". He was a fan of boxing; it was one of the few things he would watch on television. He enjoyed cannabis and, in later life, used LSD around once a year.

== Legacy ==
Regardie is a principal reliable source for much of what is known about the Hermetic Order of the Golden Dawn. His writings and the students he taught or influenced provide much of the foundation for modern Western occultism. In addition to preserving the knowledge, Regardie also preserved a valid branch of the initiatory lineage of the Golden Dawn in America:

The second significant task carried out by Regardie was, as an Adept, to bring a valid branch of the initiatory lineage of the Golden Dawn to America the alchemical melting pot where the New Age was incubating. Such tasks are not always easy. A. M. A. G. waited here four decades until the threads of the pattern came together. Then, in one of those graceful synchronicities which often play midwife to significant magical events, a couple in Georgia were inspired—at that time scarcely aware of what they were undertaking — to build a Rosicrucian Vault, the powerful ritual chamber required to pass on the Adept Initiation, at precisely the time when two magicians (one on the east coast of the United States and one on the west coast), unknown to each other or to the Georgia couple, came to be ready to receive that Initiation. And A.M.A.G., with the right to confer the Initiation in such a Vault, was the connecting link among them. And so, in one remarkable weekend, Regardie presided over two Initiations into the Inner Order, the first and the last which he ever performed; and the Lamp of the Keryx was passed into American hands. — Forrest, Adam P. in Cicero (1995), p. 541

Note: in the above paragraph, A.M.A.G. refers to Regardie. Participants in the Order took on a pseudonym or magical motto. In Regardie's case, his motto was Ad Majorem Adonai Gloriam which means "To the Greater Glory of Adonai".

In his biography of Regardie, Gerald Suster described him as "one of the most important figures in the twentieth-century development of what some have called the Western Esoteric Tradition".

== Partial bibliography ==
- A Garden of Pomegranates: an outline of the qabalah (1932)
- The Tree of Life: a study in magic (1932)
- The Art of True Healing: the unlimited power of prayer and visualisation (1932)
- My Rosicrucian Adventure (1936) (first 168 pages reprinted in 1971)
- The Golden Dawn: the original account of the teachings, rites and ceremonies of the hermetic order [4 volumes] (1937–1940)
- The Middle Pillar: the balance between mind and magic (1938)
- The Philosopher's Stone (1938)
- The Romance of Metaphysics (1945)
- The Art and Meaning of Magic (1964)
- Be Yourself, the Art of Relaxation (1965)
- Twelve Steps to Spiritual Enlightenment (1969)
- The Eye in the Triangle (1970)
- Foundation of Practical Magic: an introduction to qabalistic, magical and meditative techniques (1979)
- The Complete Golden Dawn System of Magic (1984)
- Gold (2015) (edited and annotated by Chic Cicero & Sandra Tabatha Cicero)

== See also ==
- Books about magic
- List of occultists
