= Kia (magic) =

Mystical concept similar to the Tao

Within the magical system of Austin Osman Spare, Kia is a mystical concept – a sort of universal consciousness or unity, similar to the Tao. The concept has been adopted by numerous other occultists, such as Kenneth Grant, and has been particularly influential on the chaos magic movement.

== Concept ==
The first reference to "Kia" appears on a painting exhibited by Spare in 1904, when he was just 17 years old. Spare conceived of Kia as a sort of universal mind, of which individual human consciousnesses are aspects. Spare further elaborated on the concept in The Book of Pleasure (1913), introducing it with the words:

Of name it has no name, to designate. I call it Kia I dare not claim it as myself. The Kia which can be expressed by conceivable ideas, is not the eternal Kia, which burns up all belief but is the archetype of "self," the slavery of mortality.

Spare's words here bear marked resemblance to the Tao Te Ching, which states "The Tao that can be told is not the eternal Tao; The name that can be named is not the eternal name." – and like the Tao, or the Hindu Brahman, or the Sunyata of Buddhism, Spare's conception of Kia combined pure transcendent consciousness with a voidness inherent in all things.

The writer and occultist Kenneth Grant, who had known Spare in the 1950s, promoted Spare's ideas after his death, referring to his system as "Zos Kia Cultus". Grant emphasises the similarities between Kia and certain concepts from Eastern philosophy, comparing it to the Yab-Yum of Tantra, and describing reality as the dream of Kia. However, Grant also states that Kia differs from the Buddhist concept of voidness, in that it is realised through the body, rather than the mind, stating: "The Kia is present everywhere, but the immediacy of its realisation is sought through the flesh, as in Zen it is apprehended through the mind. The object is the same in both methods, but the means appear to vary."

Grant also departs from Spare in conceptualising Kia as inherently feminine, equating it with both the Wiccan Goddess and Aleister Crowley's Babalon – the basic idea being that Kia is a sort of all-encompassing void that is impregnated by the will of the magician, and that gives birth to magical results.

One of the founders of chaos magic, Peter J. Carroll, elaborated a system heavily influenced by Spare in his early writings, particularly Liber Null (1978). However, somewhat confusingly, Carroll uses the term "Kia" to refer to the consciousness of the individual: "the elusive 'I' which confers self-awareness". The more general universal force, of which Kia is an aspect, Carroll termed "Chaos".

The unity which appears to the mind to exert the twin functions of will and perception is called Kia by magicians. Sometimes it is called the spirit, or soul, or life force, instead... Kia is capable of occult power because it is a fragment of the great life force of the universe... The "thing" responsible for the origin and continued action of events is called Chaos by magicians... Chaos... is the force which has caused life to evolve itself out of dust, and is currently most concentratedly manifest in the human life force, or Kia, where it is the source of consciousness... To the extent that the Kia can become one with Chaos it can extend its will and perception into the universe to accomplish magic.
