= Liber Pennae Praenumbra =

Sacred text in Thelema

Cover of the 2022 Black Moon Publishing edition

Liber Pennae Praenumbra (The Book of the Pre-Shadowing of the Feather) is a text by American occultist Nema Andahadna who said that she channeled the text in 1974 while in meditation. The result was a work imbued with poetic and cryptic language, filled with references to cosmic justice, personal enlightenment, and the magical formula IPSOS. This work is significant within certain esoteric circles, particularly those influenced by Thelema and the Maatian tradition.

Nema, born Margaret E. Cook, was an American occultist and writer who practiced and wrote about magick for over thirty years. She developed her own system called "Maat Magick", aiming at the transformation of the human race, and co-founded the Horus-Maat Lodge in 1979.

Liber Pennae Praenumbra is considered by its adherents to be a continuation or complement to Aleister Crowley's Liber AL vel Legis (The Book of the Law). It presents a series of visionary writings that explore themes of spiritual evolution, the interplay of cosmic forces, and the unfolding of human consciousness. The text is often associated with the Maatian current, emphasizing balance, truth, and transformation.

== Background ==
Within the system of Thelema, history is broken down into a series of Aeons, each with its own dominant concept of divinity and its own magical formula of redemption and advancement. According to Aleister Crowley, the last three Aeons have been the Aeon of Isis, the Aeon of Osiris and the current Aeon of Horus which began in 1904 with the writing of The Book of the Law.

Crowley believed that the Aeon of Ma'at will succeed the present one. According to one of Crowley's early students, Charles Stansfeld Jones (a.k.a. Frater Achad), the Aeon of Ma'at has already arrived or overlaps the present Aeon of Horus.

Crowley wrote:

I may now point out that the reign of the crowned and Conquering Child is limited in time by The Book of the Law itself. We learn that Horus will be in his turn succeeded by Thmaist, the Double-Wanded One; she who shall bring the candidates to full initiation, and though we know little of her peculiar characteristics, we know at least that her name is justice.

== History ==
In 1974, Nema Andahadna, a dedicated occultist and practitioner of ceremonial magick, received the text of Liber Pennae Praenumbra during a profound mystical experience. At the time, Nema was deeply immersed in explorations of Thelema, Kabbalah, and Hermetic traditions, and had begun developing her unique perspective on magical practice.

According to Nema's account, the channeling occurred during an intense meditative state, heightened by her invocation of the divine feminine and a focus on balancing the cosmic forces of the Aeons. She described the experience as a direct transmission from what she called the "Maatian Current"—a flow of consciousness originating from the future Aeon of Ma'at. During this transmission, Nema reported encountering a powerful archetypal presence that revealed itself as the embodiment of Truth and Transformation.

The text was received as a series of vivid impressions and dictations, which Nema wrote down in a trance-like state. She described the process as fluid but overwhelming, with phrases, symbols, and ideas forming faster than she could consciously interpret them. The result was a work imbued with poetic and cryptic language, filled with references to cosmic justice, personal enlightenment, and the formula of IPSOS, which she later understood to mean "themselves".

After the channeling, Nema spent months reflecting on and decoding the text's meaning. She believed it represented a pivotal spiritual revelation not just for her, but for the evolution of human consciousness. Initially shared with close colleagues, including members of the emerging Horus-Maat Lodge, the text soon gained recognition for its visionary quality and its potential to complement Aleister Crowley's Liber AL vel Legis.

== Themes ==
=== Double current ===
Liber Pennae Praenumbra asserts the existence of a "double current" with respect to time. It posits that the current Aeon of Horus and the Aeon of Ma'at are active at the same time. According to Laccetti, this is believed to facilitate the coming of universal human rights, the acceptance of more fluid political and gender identities, and the fulfillment of truth and justice.

=== N'Aton ===
Liber Pennae Praenumbra introduces the archetype of N'Aton, identified with the "coming race" of homo veritas (true human). N'Aton is figured as the "collective humanity of the future", identified as a shared superconsciousness which is dormant or asleep in most people, but which can be awakened through the theurgy of Maatian magic.

=== IPSOS ===
IPSOS, meaning "themselves", is the magical formula of the Aeon of Ma'at as transmitted by Nema Andahadna in her inspired magical work, Liber Pennae Praenumbra. It is used by the Horus-Maat Lodge and Kenneth Grant's Typhonian Order. According to Kenneth Grant, its initiated translation is "the same mouth". According to Grant, the word IPSOS was received by initiates who were in communication with extraterrestrial intelligences. He equates the word with part of a cryptic cipher in Liber AL (II, 76), RPSTOVAL, by virtue of the fact that in the qabalistic art of gematria, both evaluate to either 696 or 456, depending on whether an 'S' in each is taken as the Hebrew letter shin or samekh.

== Reception ==
Since its publication by Nema in 1974, Liber Pennae Praenumbra has held a significant place in modern occult traditions, particularly among practitioners of Maatian magick. The text was quickly embraced by the Horus-Maat Lodge, which incorporated its teachings into rituals and doctrines centered on the Aeon of Maat. Its central formula, IPSOS, became a key component of the Lodge's spiritual practices, emphasizing self-realization and cosmic balance.

Occultist Kenneth Grant praised the work in his writings, including Beyond the Mauve Zone, where he drew connections between the text and the Typhonian current. Grant's interpretation of IPSOS as a magical formula linked to extraterrestrial intelligences added a unique dimension to its reception, particularly among adherents of his system.

Academics like Don Karr and Nicholas Laccetti have also examined the text's significance. Karr explored its implications for Maatian Kabbalah, while Laccetti has connected its vision of homo veritas to broader philosophical ideas, including those of Teilhard de Chardin and other 20th-century theologians.

== Theology ==
According to Nicholas Laccetti, the future vision of man as homo veritas (true human) resembles the mid-20th-century concepts of Catholic theologians Pierre Teilhard de Chardin, Juan Luis Segundo, and Edward Schillebeeckx. In particular, Laccetti identifies N'Aton with Teilhard's Omega Point, Segundo's "New Humanity", and Schillebeeckx's humanum. He connects N'Aton with the latter's declaration that God is "each new moment" and that "God is the future of man".

Summarizing the beliefs of the Horus-Maat Lodge, Laccetti writes:

The Aeon of Maat comes to us from the future, while the Aeon of Horus, through warlike "force and fire", establishes itself by the ever-accelerating present. The point at which these two Aeons meet is our eshatological kairos moment, a moment in which we can catch a glimpse of the future shape of the human being—in the "mutants" who are the avatars of "the coming race of 'homo veritas'".
