= Illuminates of Thanateros =

International magical organization

- The Sigil of Chaos the symbol of the Illuminates of Thanateros
- Abbreviation: IOT
- Formation: 1978
- Region served: Worldwide
- Key people: Peter J. Carroll; Ray Sherwin
- Website: iotbritishisles.com iot-na.thanateros.org www.iotaustria.org

The Illuminates of Thanateros (IOT) (/ɪˈljuːmɪˌnɪts ɒv ˌθænəˈtɛroʊs/) is an international magical organization that focuses on practical group work in chaos magic. The idea was first announced in 1978, while the order proper was formed in 1987. This fraternal magical society has been an important influence on some forms of modern occultism. It has been described as "an unprecedented attempt of institutionalising one of the most individualising currents in the history of ‘Western learned magic’."

The IOT has been described as "the Order for 'serious' Chaos Magicians in the same way that the OTO exists for 'serious' Thelemites." The IOT is considered to be an occult or neoshamanic organization.

== Name ==
The formal name of the group is The Magical Pact of the Illuminates of Thanateros. The name "Thanateros" is a combination of the names "Thanatos" and "Eros", the Greek gods of death and sex, respectively. The idea is that sex and death represent the positive and negative methods of attaining "magical consciousness". The word "Illuminates" refers to the claimed tradition of calling societies where those who have mastered the secrets of magic help bring others to mastership "the Illuminati".

== History ==
=== Early ===
In 1976, Ray Sherwin and Peter Carroll, two young British occultists interested in ritual magic, began to publish a magazine called The New Equinox. Both were connected with a burgeoning occult scene developing around The Phoenix, a metaphysical bookshop in London's East End. Dissatisfied with the state of the magical arts and the deficiencies they saw in the available occult groups, they announced the creation of the Illuminates of Thanateros in a 1978 issue of their magazine. They described it as a new kind of magical order and a meritocracy with strict admission criteria, where membership was based on demonstrable magical ability, rather than on invitation by members. They described the IOT as a "spiritual heir" to the Zos Kia Cultus and a "fusion of Thelemic Magick, Tantra, The Sorceries of Zos and Tao". Subsequently, the group has sought to legitimize itself less through tradition and more through results-based experimentation.

IOT ritual; an anonymous costumed adept presenting an invocation of the deity Azathoth

The group's formation was heavily affected by anarchic and countercultural ideas and in their descriptions of the practice of chaos magic, "chaos is depicted not simply as a cosmic force, but as a call to action and destabilization against the establishment and against reality itself." In contrast to established neopagan, occultist or esoteric Christian magical organizations, it took its experimentalist approach and many of its concepts from science, especially chaos theory, as many of its early members were scientists.

The group says about itself that in its early years, it was "rarely more than a loose correspondence network and a few people meeting for rituals in East Morton" and that the sustained organization was established only in 1987. By 1989 it had grown to 130 members worldwide. Members included Timothy Leary and Robert Anton Wilson, as well as William Burroughs.

=== Ourano-Barbarian ===
In early years the IOT developed their own magical language to use in rituals. Ourano-Barbarian is not spoken as an everyday language and its purpose is to distract the conscious mind and free the magician from the linear thought process while creating ritual proclamations and statements of intent. "One theory is that by using nonunderstandable language in ritual situations, this type of language occupies the verbal parts of consciousness, allowing a certain amount of Freedom of Belief to arise in the rest of the brain".

=== Ice magick schism ===
In the early 1990s the order experienced a schism as a result of conflicts about the doctrine of 'ice magick', a major proponent of which was Ralph Tegtmeier.

Peter Carroll learned more about the racial doctrines that Tegtmeier was teaching, and criticized him for it. That led to an untenable conflict between Carroll and Tegtmeier, which culminated in Tegtmeier and all of his followers seceding. The vast majority of German and Swiss members left the order, which constituted about 30% of the order's total membership. Ralph Tegtmeier and a few others were subsequently excommunicated.

=== Recent ===
After publishing Liber Kaos, Carroll retired from active participation in the order, though he remained on good terms with many of the longstanding members until his death in April 2026.

The group claims to have been "constantly evolving" and grown highly diverse, and has grown to include local representations in additional regions such as Bulgaria, France, Greece, Poland. It maintains various social media channels and regularly offers events that are open to non-members.

The order organizes local groups (Temples) and larger meetings where members can take part in magical work in group context.

IOT Temples are autonomous, provided they follow a few basic rules, which keep the IOT’s identity intact. This means that there isn’t a single type of work that all Temples will engage in – each is an affinity group with its own specifications. Throughout the Pact, the variety of working paradigms and magical models used is quite extensive. ~The Book of the Pact, IOT British Isles
