= Ralph Tegtmeier =

German occult writer

- Born: November 1, 1952 (age 73); Heliopolis-Cairo, Egypt

Ralph Tegtmeier (born November 1, 1952), also known as Frater V∴D∴ and Frater U∴D∴, is a German occultist, a longtime member of the Fraternitas Saturni, and co-founder of the Illuminates of Thanateros.

== Significance ==
Horst E. Miers in his (German) Encyclopedia of Occult Sciences cites him as the "founder of Pragmatic Magic" whose "works are characterized by an outstanding conciseness". According to Miers,

While the initial impulses of Pragmatic Magic can be verified as early as Spare and Staudenmaier, its consistent implementation in the German speaking realm was only effected by Frater V∴D∴ who also introduced the term.

He is featured in Gerhard Mayer's field study of 11 contemporary magicians where he is referenced both under his public magical name Frater V∴D∴ and, perfunctorily anonymized, as Isbrand.

== Background ==
While residing in Bonn, Germany from 1979 to 1981, Tegtmeier ran an occult bookstore named Horus. In conjunction with the bookstore, an experimental magical group that became informally known as 'The Bonn Group' was formed. During this time Peter J. Carroll's Liber Null was translated and published by Tegtmeier under his Edition Magus label.

In the late 1980s, during his active participation in the order, Tegtmeier developed the concept of cyber magic. He was also the second-foremost proponent of 'ice magick', second only to the creator of ice magick, Helmut Barthel. In the early 1990s, Tegtmeier was involved with a schism from the Illuminates of Thanateros, an event known as 'the ice magick wars'. Tegtmeier has been uninvolved with the IOT since then, and has distanced himself from Chaos Magic as represented by Carroll.

Ralph gave his first public account of the schism in an interview with David Rietti, which was published in 2006 in the UK-based occult magazine, The Oracle. There, he states that, while the altercation between him and Carroll and the subsequent schism positively occurred, the 'ice magick war' itself was an entirely delusionary event that never actually took place except in his detractors' imagination. Ralph also states that during said schism, 80% of the order's membership left the organization, setting up an alternative organization (the Revolutionary Illuminates of Thanateros or RIOT), disputing his opponent's claim that the order was actually saved. Contrary to that inflated statistic, Peter Carroll himself has stated that only the German and Swiss divisions of the order split off, and together they constituted about 30 percent of the total IoT membership.

In his self-published book eismagie. erste einblicke (ice magic. first insights) Tegtmeier is radically critical of conventional magic and its shortcomings, calling for a deconstructionist approach stripped from cultural, historical and societal bias. He promotes an alternate definition of magic as "doing the impossible".

== Written works ==
=== Under the name Frater U∴D∴ ===
- Handbuch der Sexualmagie. Praktische Wege zum eingeweihten Umgang mit den subtilen Kräften des Sexus, akasha Verlagsgesellschaft, Haar [1986], ISBN 3-922992-02-1 (Secrets of Western Sex Magic)
- Sigillenmagie in der Praxis, Edition Magus, Unkel 1988, ISBN 3-924613-13-3 (Practical Sigil Magic)
- Was Sie noch nie über Magie wissen wollten... Tante Klaras Kummertempel, Band I, Edition Magus, Unkel 1989, ISBN 3-924613-18-4 (What you never wanted to know about magic ... Aunt Klara's Temple of Sorrows)
- Kursus der praktischen Magie (three volumes), Edition Magus, Bad Münstereifel 1990, ISBN 3-938393-11-4, ISBN 3-938393-12-2 & ISBN 3-938393-13-0
- Practical Sigil Magic, Llewellyn Worldwide, St. Paul, Minn. 1990, ISBN 978-0-87542-774-4
- Secrets of the German Sex Magicians: A Practical Handbook for Men & Women, Llewellyn's, St. Paul, Minn. 1991, ISBN 978-0-87542-773-7
- eismagie - erste einblicke, Edition Magus, Bad Münstereifel 1996, ISBN 3-938393-01-7 (Ice Magic)
- Secrets of Western Sex Magic: Magical Energy and Gnostic Trance, Llewellyn's, St. Paul, Minn. 2001, ISBN 978-1-56718-706-9
- Die Schule der Hohen Magie (two volumes), Ansata, München 2001, ISBN 3-7787-7182-5 & [München] 2003, ISBN 3-7787-7224-4 (High Magic)
- High Magic: Theory & Practice, Llewellyn's 2005, ISBN 978-0-7387-0471-5
- Wo wohnen die Dämonen? Was Sie schon immer über Magie wissen wollten, Heyne, München 2005, ISBN 978-3-453-70015-4 (Where Do Demons Live?)
- Geldmagie: Reichtum anziehen, mehren, schützen, Ansata, München 2007, ISBN 3-7787-7333-X
- High Magic II: Expanded Theory and Practice, Llewellyn's, St. Paul, Minn. 2008, ISBN 978-0-7387-0471-5
- Sexualmagie: Freisetzung und gezielte Anwendung der Kräfte des Eros , Ansata, München 2008, ISBN 3-7787-7334-8,
- Where Do Demons Live? Everything You Want to Know About Magic, Llewellyn's, St. Paul, Minn. 2010, ISBN 978-0-7387-1479-0
- The Magical Shield: Protection Magic to Ward Off Negative Forces, Llewellyn Worldwide, Woodbury, Minn. 2016, ISBN 978-0-7387-4999-0

=== Under the name Ralph Tegtmeier ===
- Okkultismus und Erotik in der Literatur des Fin de siècle. Edition Magus, Königswinter 1983
- Der heilende Regenbogen: Sinnvolle Spiele, Experimente und Meditationen zum kreativen Umgang mit den geheimnisvollen Energien von Klang, Farbe und Licht. Edition Schangrila, Haldenwang 1985, ISBN 3-924624-14-3
- Evolutions-Training: Die Methode zur Erschließung der Kraftzentren d. Unterbewußtseins. Durch Trance-Reisen in die eigene Entwicklungsgeschichte. Edition Schangrila, Haldenwang 1986, ISBN 3-924624-39-9
- Musikführer für die Reise nach innen. Kosmische Klänge zum Entspannen und Meditieren. Die Erfahrbarkeit kosmischer Musik mit Meditationsübungen und Wahrnehmungsschulungen. Edition Schangrila, Haldenwang 1986, ISBN 3-924624-39-9
- Die heilende Kraft der Elemente. Praxis der Tattwa-Therapie. Verlag Hermann Bauer, Freiburg 1986, ISBN 3-7626-0304-9
- Tarot. Geschichte eines Schicksalsspiels.. DuMont Buchverlag, Köln 1986, ISBN 978-3-7701-1682-9
- Zur Gestalt des Androgyns in der Literatur des Fin de siècle, in: Androgyn. Sehnsucht nach Vollkommenheit. (Cat.), ed. by Ursula Prinz, Berlin 1987, S. 113-119
- Der Geist in der Münze. Vom magischen Umgang mit Reichtum und Geld. Goldmann Verlag, München 1988, ISBN 3-442-11820-4
- Runen: Alphabet der Erkenntnis. Urania, Neuhausen 1988, ISBN 3-908644-52-6
- Aleister Crowley. Die tausend Masken des Meisters. Knaur, München 1989, ISBN 3-426-02403-9
- Sternenglaube - Sternenzauber. Das Weltbild der Astrologie. DuMont Buchverlag, Köln 1990, ISBN 3-7701-2183-X
- Zauber der Runen. Ein praktisches Arbeitsbuch der esoterischen Runenkunde. Goldmann Verlag, München 1991, ISBN 3-442-11899-9
- Astro 5.0 für Einsteiger: Astrologie für Computerfreaks. Goldmann Verlag, München 1992, ISBN 3-442-27052-9
- Magie und Sternenzauber. Okkultismus im Abendland. DuMont Buchverlag, Köln 1995, ISBN 3-7701-2666-1
- Astrologie. Edition Roter Löwe im Aurum Verlag, Braunschweig 1995, ISBN 3-591-08364-X
- Rune Cards by Klaus Holitzka and Ralph Tegtmeier

=== Under the name Viktor Sobek ===
- Die Schattenmeister (trilogy of novels), Edition Magus, Bad Münstereifel 1995, ISBN 3-924613-50-8
