= The Magical Revival =

1972 book by Kenneth Grant

- First edition cover
- Author: Kenneth Grant
- Language: English
- Subject: Occult
- Publisher: Frederick Muller Ltd
- Publication date: 1972
- Publication place: United Kingdom
- Media type: Print (hardcover)
- Pages: 244 pp (first edition)
- ISBN: 9780584101751 (first edition)
- OCLC: 410033
- Dewey Decimal: 133.4
- LC Class: BF1611 .G67 1972
- Followed by: Aleister Crowley and the Hidden God

The Magical Revival is a nonfiction book written by British occultist Kenneth Grant, first published in 1972. It is the first of his "Typhonian Trilogy", which comprises this work and two others—Aleister Crowley and the Hidden God (1973) and Cults of the Shadow (1975). In this work, he introduced his theory that American horror author H. P. Lovecraft's Cthulhu mythos was psychic revelation presented as fiction, an idea which he would elaborate and extend further in his later works.

Grant wrote in this book that there was an unconscious connection between Lovecraft and occultist Aleister Crowley, arguing that both of them channeled their work from the same occult forces although Lovecraft was not consciously aware of the alleged otherworldly sources of his literary inspirations. This idea—that what is ostensibly presented as fiction is often a vehicle masking deeper realities—has precedence in the inclusion by Crowley of numerous works of fiction in the official reading syllabus of his magical order, the A∴A∴.

== Reception ==
According to Professor Joshua Gunn of the University of Texas, The Magical Revival has been criticised by many occultists and historians alike for its "creative history making". On the other hand, British author Colin Wilson gave a far more favourable review in his biography of Crowley, praising that The Magical Revival is "probably the best history of modern magic in existence".

Encyclopedia of Occultism and Parapsychology called it "a very informative survey of occult theory and practice in modern times". Routledge Library Editions: Occultism listed it as one of the source books in its chapter on sexual magic, commenting: "A survey of the subject from a distinctly Crowleyan viewpoint, this includes very interesting and significant material on Crowley, Austin Spare, Dion Fortune and witchcraft."

== Translations ==
In 1983, the Japanese edition of The Magical Revival, translated by Professor Yasuo Uematsu of Tohoku Gakuin University, was published under the title Majutsu no fukkatsu (魔術の復活^{?}; lit. 'Revival of Magic').^{[a]}
