= Typhonian Order =

Magical organization

The Typhonian Order, previously known as Typhonian Ordo Templi Orientis (T.O.T.O.), is a self-initiatory magical organization based in the United Kingdom that focuses on magical and Typhonian concepts. It was originally led by British occultist Kenneth Grant (1924–2011) and his wife Steffi Grant, and is now led by their deputy Michael Staley.

The Typhonian Order is among the most well-known Thelemic magical orders, primarily due to the publications of Kenneth Grant. In particular, it has influenced Dragon Rouge and was instrumental in the creation of Nema Andahadna's Maat Magick movement.

While the group continues to promote Aleister Crowley's religion, Thelema, it also focuses on exploration of foreign intelligence such as extraterrestrial life and daemons, as well as the darker aspects of occult existence.

While not central to the Typhonian Order, one of the most notable, studied and controversial aspects of the tradition surround Kenneth Grant's use of the fictional works of cosmic horror author H.P. Lovecraft to explore occult psychology in that he viewed the entities of the Cthulhu Mythos not merely as fictional creations but as manifestations of archetypal realities, possibly even as symbolic representations of actual spiritual forces or beings.

== History ==
Ordo Templi Orientis (O.T.O.) was founded by the wealthy Austrian industrialist Carl Kellner. After Kellner's death in 1905, Theodor Reuss became Outer Head of the Order.

In 1920, Reuss suffered a stroke, leading Aleister Crowley to question his competence to continue as Outer Head of the Order. By 1921, Crowley and Reuss were exchanging angry letters, culminating in Reuss' expulsion of Crowley from O.T.O. Crowley then informed Reuss that he was proclaiming himself Outer Head of the Order. Reuss died in 1923 without naming a successor, and Crowley was subsequently elected and ratified as Outer Head of the Order in a Conference of Grand Masters in 1925. World War II then intervened, destroying the European branches of O.T.O. and driving its members underground. Karl Germer was incarcerated by the Nazis. By the end of the war, the sole surviving O.T.O. organization was Agapé Lodge in California, where Germer moved after he was released from internment in 1941.

After Crowley's death, Germer was his unchallenged successor for some time, and recognized and endorsed Grant's status as a IX° (Ninth Degree) adept in 1948. However Grant later claimed that his assumption of the XI° (Eleventh Degree) was confirmed in 1946, presumably by Crowley, the same year that he was initiated into the A∴A∴, an associated Thelemic magical order created by Crowley in 1907 after leaving the Hermetic Order of the Golden Dawn.

In 1954, Grant began the work of founding the New Isis Lodge, which became operational in 1955 when Grant announced his discovery of a "Sirius/Set current" in a new manifesto upon which the lodge would be based. In this manifesto, Grant wrote that a new energy was emanating down from Earth from another planet which he identified with Nuit, a goddess who appears in the first chapter of Crowley's Thelemic holy text, The Book of the Law. Germer however deemed it "blasphemy" that Grant had identified a single planet with Nuit; on 20 July 1955, Germer issued a "Note of Expulsion" expelling Grant from O.T.O.

In 1969, Grant co-edited The Confessions of Aleister Crowley for publication with Crowley's literary executor John Symonds. Over the coming years he edited – often with Symonds – a range of Crowley writings for republication, resulting in the release of The Magical Record of the Beast 666 (1972), Diary of a Drug Fiend (1972), Moonchild (1972), Magick (1973), Magical and Philosophical Commentaries on The Book of the Law (1974) and The Complete Astrological Writings (1974). The release of these publications has been described as being "instrumental in the revival of interest in Crowley".

At this point, Grant began describing himself as O.H.O. (Outer Head of the Order) of O.T.O., claiming that he deserved this title not by direct succession from Crowley but because he displayed the inspiration and innovation that Germer lacked. A document purportedly by Crowley naming Grant as his successor was subsequently exposed as a hoax created by Robert Taylor, a Typhonian O.T.O. member. In the early 1970s he established his own Thelemic organisation, the Typhonian O.T.O., which produced its first official announcement in 1973. Although adopting the O.T.O. degree system used by Crowley, Grant removed the rituals of initiation designed to allow a member to enter a higher degree; instead he personally promoted them through the degrees according to what he believed were their own personal spiritual development.

Grant's work and the organization itself moved increasingly away from the traditional O.T.O. structures and teachings, towards a more distinct identity. The renaming to "The Typhonian Order" signifies this ideological and practical departure, focusing more explicitly on Grant's specific interests in the darker aspects of the occult, extraterrestrial dimensions of consciousness, and the exploration of what he termed the "Tunnels of Set." These concepts delve into areas of the occult that are far removed from the original teachings of the O.T.O., hence the rebranding serves not only as a formal but also a symbolic declaration of independence and differentiation.

== Work of the order ==
Grant promoted what he termed the Typhonian or Draconian tradition of magic, and wrote that Thelema was only a recent manifestation of this wider tradition. In his books, he portrayed the Typhonian tradition as the world's oldest spiritual tradition, suggesting that it had ancient roots in Africa. In Central Africa during prehistory, he believed there had been a religion devoted to the worship of a goddess known as Ta-Urt or Typhon, from which the Typhonian tradition stems. This was an idea he had adopted from Gerald Massey's 1881 publication A Book of Beginnings, a work promoting ideas which had never been accepted among scholars. According to Grant, Typhonianism was typified by its worship of female deities and its use of sex as a method of spiritual achievement. He wrote that this tradition spread throughout the world, forming the basis of forms of ancient Egyptian religion as well as Indian Tantra and forms of Western esotericism. He added that for millennia, the Typhonian tradition has been opposed by the "Osirians" or "Solarites", practitioners of patriarchal and solar religions, who have portrayed the Typhonians as evil, corrupt, and debauched. The religious studies scholar Gordan Djurdjevic noted that Grant's Typhonian history was "at best highly speculative" and lacked any supporting evidence, however he suggested that Grant may never have intended it to be taken literally.

Grant adopted a perennialist interpretation of the history of religion. Grant's wrote that Indian spiritual traditions like Tantra and Yoga correlate to Western esoteric traditions, and that both stem from a core, ancient source, has parallels in the perennial philosophy promoted by the Traditionalist School of esotericists. However, Grant differed from Traditionalists like René Guénon and Ananda Coomaraswamy in his positive assessment of Western occultism. Moreover, Grant's appreciation of Asian spiritual traditions has much in common with Theosophy, although Grant differed from the Theosophical movement with his valorisation of the 'left-hand path'.

Influenced by Maharshi, Grant adopted the Advaitan world-view that only "the Self", or atman, really exists, with the wider universe being an illusory projection. He believed that by mastering magic, one masters this illusory universe, gaining personal liberation and recognising that only the Self really exists. Doing so, according to Grant, leads to the discovery of one's True Will, the central focus of Thelema. Grant further wrote that the realm of the Self was known as "the Mauve Zone", and that it could be reached while in a state of deep sleep, where it has the symbolic appearance of a swamp. He also believed that the reality of consciousness, which he deemed the only true reality, was formless and thus presented as a void, although he also taught that it was symbolised by the Hindu goddess Kali and the Thelemic goddess Nuit.

Grant's views on sex magic drew heavily on the importance of sexual dimorphism among humans and the subsequent differentiation of gender roles. Grant taught that the true secret of sex magic were bodily secretions, the most important of which was a woman's menstrual blood. In this he differed from Crowley, who viewed semen as the most important genital secretion. Grant referred to female sexual secretions as kalas, a term adopted from Sanskrit. He thought that because women have kalas, they have oracular and visionary powers. The magical uses of female genital secretions are a recurring theme in Grant's writings. He believed that the XI° degree O.T.O. ritual, which Crowley argued necessitated anal sex, should instead involve vaginal sex with a menstruating woman. He was critical of Crowley's use of anal sex in rituals, stating his view that the "sodomitical formula" was "a perversion of magical practice". These views have brought accusations of homophobia from later occultists such as Phil Hine.

== Relationship to H. P. Lovecraft's Cthulhu mythos ==
In Grant's perspective, Lovecraft's narratives and mythos tapped into the same primordial truths and cosmic mysteries that esoteric traditions and magical practices sought to explore. This conceptual synthesis is apparent in the Typhonian Tradition, which integrates Thelemic principles with themes derived from Lovecraft's work, among other influences. The Typhonian Order, thus, stands as a unique bridge between the realms of early 20th-century esoteric practices and the cosmic horror genre of fiction.

== See also ==
- Aleister Crowley bibliography
- Kenneth Grant bibliography
- Qlippoth
