= Earth Inferno =

1905 book by Austin Osman Spare

- Author: Austin Osman Spare
- Language: English
- Genre: Occult
- Publisher: C.H.L., London
- Publication date: February 1905
- Publication place: England
- Media type: Limited print (Paperback)
- Pages: 34 pages
- ISBN: 1-872189-56-3
- OCLC: 271768859
- Preceded by: -
- Followed by: A Book of Satyrs (1907)

Earth Inferno is the first book by the English artist and magician Austin Osman Spare, written when he was 18.

== Artist's book ==
Conceived as an anti-establishment reaction to the publicity surrounding his inclusion in the Royal Academy summer show in 1904, the book was developed over the remainder of that year and was eventually published in 1905. Printed by the Co-Operative Printing Society, the book was designed by the artist and self-published in an edition of 265 numbered and signed copies.

== Influences and design ==
Influenced heavily by Dante's Inferno, the book is decorated with poems and aphorisms in an aesthetic style. It clearly shows the design influence of Spare's early supporter Charles Ricketts. Each pair of pages contains a painting and a commentary toward that painting. In addition to excerpts from Dante, the book also contains excerpts from Edward FitzGerald's translation of Rubaiyat of Omar Khayyam.

== Concepts ==
Published when the artist was 18 years of age, the book introduces the reader for the first time to Spare's fundamental concepts such as Kia, Ikkah and Sikah, and Zos.

On page 10, Spare alludes to "The Book of KIĀ".
