= Nema Andahadna =

American occult writer (1939–2018)

- Born: Margaret E. Cook; September 16, 1939; Cincinnati, Ohio, US
- Died: January 9, 2018 (aged 78); Columbus, Ohio, US
- Alma mater: Mount St. Joseph University
- Occupations: Occultist, writer
- Spouse: Michael David Ingalls
- Writing career
- Pen name: Nema
- Years active: 1974–2008
- Genre: Occult
- Subject: Magick
- Notable work: Maat Magick

Margaret E. Ingalls (née Cook; September 16, 1939 – January 9, 2018), known by her pen name Nema Andahadna or simply Nema, was an American occultist, ceremonial magician, and writer known for her magical writings about the Ma'atian current, best known for her work Liber Pennae Praenumbra and as co-founder of the Horus-Maat Lodge.

== Early life and education ==
Margaret E. Cook was born on September 16, 1939, in Cincinnati, Ohio, to William Maurice and Edna Rita (Specht) Cook. She attended Mount St. Joseph University where she earned a bachelor's degree in English and Journalism. After graduating, she worked in market research.

== Writing career ==
Nema Andahadna practiced and wrote about magick (magical working, as defined by Aleister Crowley) for over thirty years. In 1974, she channelled a short book called Liber Pennae Praenumbra.

From her experience with Thelemic magick, she developed her own system of magic called Maat Magick which has the aim of transforming the human race. In 1979, she co-founded the Horus-Maat Lodge. The Lodge and her ideas have been featured in the writings of Kenneth Grant.

Her writings have appeared in many publications, including the Cincinnati Journal of Ceremonial Magick, Aeon, and Starfire. According to Donald Michael Kraig:

Nema has been one of the most influential occultists of the last quarter century although most occultists have never read her works. What Nema has done is influence those who have been writers and teachers. They, in turn, influenced the rest of us.

== Personal life ==
Nema married Michael David Ingalls. She had one son and three daughters from previous marriages.

Nema died on January 9, 2018, at Riverside Methodist Hospital in Columbus, Ohio.

== Works ==
=== Partial bibliography ===
- Nema (1974). "Liber Pennae Praenumbra". Cincinnati Journal of Ceremonial Magick.
- Nema (1985). The Priesthood: Parameters and Responsibilities. Cincinnati: Black Moon Publishing.
- Nema (1995a). Maat Magic: a Guide to Self-Initiation. York Beach, Maine: Samuel Weiser. ISBN 0-87728-827-5.
- Nema (1995b). The Way of Mystery: Magick, Mysticism & Self-Transcendence. Llewellyn Publications. ISBN 0-7387-0290-0.
- Nema (2004). "The Evolution of Maat Magick: from Cornfields to Cyberspace". Silverstar. No. 2. Archived from the original on 2007-12-28. (Text of lecture delivered 4/10/2004 at the Thelemic Conference held at Conway Hall, London)
- Nema (2008). Maatian Meditations And Considerations. Black Moon Publishing. ISBN 978-1-890399-10-8.

=== Discography ===
- Pan-Aeonic Magick (lecture on cassette). Association for Consciousness Exploration.
