= The Book of Pleasure =

1913 book by Austin Osman Spare

The Book of Pleasure (Self-Love): Psychology of Ecstasy
- Author: Austin Osman Spare
- Language: English
- Genre: Occult
- Publisher: Cooperative Printing Society Limited, Tudor Street, E.C.
- Publication date: 1913
- Publication place: England
- Media type: Limited print (Paperback)
- Pages: 68 pages
- ISBN: 1-872189-58-X
- Preceded by: A Book of Satyrs (1907)
- Followed by: The Focus of Life (1921)

The Book of Pleasure (Self-Love): Psychology of Ecstasy is a chapbook written by artist-occultist Austin Osman Spare during 1909–1913 and self-published in 1913.

== Overview ==
The book is generally regarded as the core text of Spare's philosophy. It covers both mystical and magical aspects of Spare's ideas. As the modern ideas on sigils (as now have become popular in chaos magic) and Spare's special theory on incarnation are for the first time introduced in this book.

Some chapters of the text referred to internally are omitted, having apparently been destroyed during World War II.

The book had originally been planned as a mutus liber of illustrations only – "the Wisdom without words", but was expanded later.

== Partial list of editions ==
- Quebec: 93 Publishing, 1975.
- Northampton: Sut Anubis, 1987 (facsimile).
