= Symbol of Chaos =

Symbol from the books of Michael Moorcock

The Chaos Star

The Symbol of Chaos (also known as the Chaos Star) originates from Michael Moorcock's Elric of Melniboné stories and their dichotomy of Law and Chaos. In them, the Symbol of Chaos comprises eight arrows in a radial pattern. Tabletop roleplaying games and other forms of popular culture, and real world organizations and movements have subsequently used it as a symbol.

== Origins ==
Michael Moorcock conceived this symbol while writing the first Elric of Melniboné stories in the 1960s. It later became common in popular culture, appearing in occult traditions and role-playing games. In an interview, Moorcock described how he designed the symbol:

I drew a straightforward geographical quadrant (which often has arrows, too!) – N, S, E, W – and then added another four directions and that was that – eight arrows representing all possibilities, one arrow representing the single, certain road of Law. I have since been told to my face that it is an "ancient symbol of Chaos".

== In occultism ==
In the late 1970s, the Chaos Star became the main symbol of chaos magic, a branch of western esotericism which originated in England. A variant on it, with an eye similar to the Eye of Horus in its center, is the official symbol of the Illuminates of Thanateros, a magical order dedicated to chaos magic. It has occasionally been used astrologically as a symbol for the trans-Neptunian object 19521 Chaos.

== In gaming ==
The symbol's first appearance in a commercial role-playing game was in the Dungeons & Dragons supplement Deities & Demigods published in 1980, which featured Elric, as well as gods and monsters related to the Elric series. It was also used by Stormbringer, Chaosium's licensed adaptation of the Elric stories, and by Warhammer, Warhammer 40,000, and Warhammer Age of Sigmar, among other games.

== In computing ==
The symbol was used in the logo and launcher menu of CentOS Linux, which originated from the cAos Linux distribution.

== Political uses ==
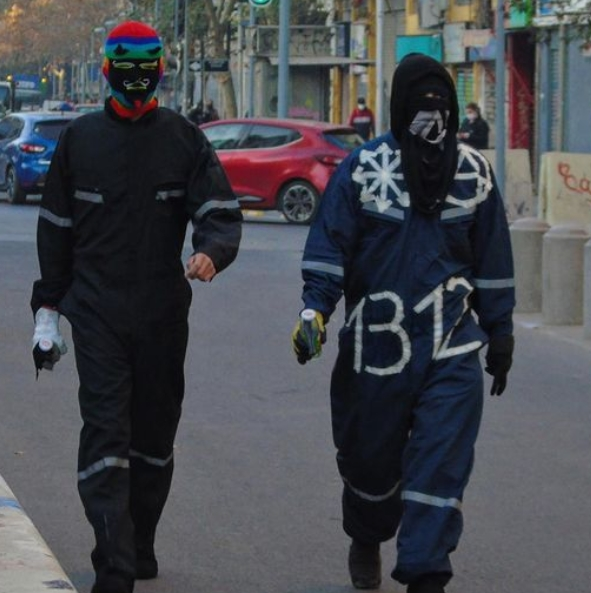
Chilean insurrectionary anarchists , one of which wears the Chaos Star symbol

The Chaos Star in its original form has been adopted by multiple Eastern European and North and Latin American activist groups affiliated with post-leftism, insurrectionary anarchism and nihilist anarchism. The symbol likely came into modern anarchism movements from punk artwork and zines fulfilling the need for a unified symbol. A contributing factor to its adoption may be that Moorcock himself identifies as an anarchist.

According to Anton Shekhovtsov, Aleksandr Dugin has used a modified version of the symbol to represent his idea of Neo-Eurasianism, and it can be seen on the logo of his Eurasia Party and the cover of his book Foundations of Geopolitics.

== See also ==
- Arrow Cross
- Chaostar
- Dingir
- Unicursal hexagram
- Octagram
