= The Focus of Life =

1921 book by Austin Osman Spare

Focus of Life: The Mutterings of AOS
- Author: Austin Osman Spare
- Language: English
- Genre: Occult
- Publisher: Morland Press, London
- Publication date: February 1921
- Publication place: England
- Media type: Limited print (Hardcopy)
- Pages: 6+44 pages
- OCLC: 3457481
- Preceded by: The Book of Pleasure (1913)
- Followed by: Anathema of Zos (1927)

The Focus of Life: The Mutterings of AOS is a comprehensive treatise written and illustrated by Austin Osman Spare on key occult concepts he introduced in his previous writings.

The book first published in 1921 by the Morland Press and edited by Fredrick Carter with an introduction by Francis Marsden. The book contains 11 full-page illustrations.

The first edition was quarter vellum with buckram sides, lettered in gold on the spine "The Focus of Life". Released in 50 copies, numbered and signed on the half-title.

The book contains three "Aphorisms" along with various accounts of Spare's dreams. The "Aphorisms" section in this book is the sole comprehensive reference to three central ideas of Kia, Ikkah and ZOS.

In this book, Spare also introduces another important central concept of his teachings, the "great duality":

Belief and desire are the great duality which engender all illusions that entangle the senses [i.e. sexuality] and prevent free will.
