= Peter J. Carroll =

British occultist and writer (1953–2026)

- Born: 1953; England
- Died: 22 April 2026 (aged 72–73)
- Occupation: Magician
- Years active: 1970s–2026
- Website: www.specularium.org

Peter James Carroll (1953 – 22 April 2026) was an English occultist and writer. He was one of the originators of chaos magic theory, a cofounder of the Illuminates of Thanateros, and the founder and chancellor of Arcanorium College.

== Life and career ==
Peter James Carroll was born in England in 1953. In the late 1970s, Carroll and Ray Sherwin, two young British occultists interested in ritual magic, began to publish a magazine called The New Equinox. Both men were connected with a burgeoning occult scene developing around The Phoenix, a metaphysical bookshop in London's East End. Having grown dissatisfied with the state of the magical arts and the deficiencies they saw in the available occult groups, they published a small announcement in a 1978 issue of their magazine, announcing the creation of the Illuminates of Thanateros (IOT), which has been described as "an unprecedented attempt of institutionalising one of the most individualising currents in the history of 'Western learned magic'".

Carroll first issued Liber Null in 1978 and Psychonaut in 1982. They were published together in the 1987 book Liber Null & Psychonaut, which is considered one of the defining works of the chaos magic movement. He has also written columns for the Chaos International magazine under the names Pete Carroll and Stokastikos.

He elaborated a system heavily influenced by Austin Osman Spare in his early writings, particularly Liber Null (1978). However, somewhat confusingly, Carroll used the term 'Kia' to refer to the consciousness of the individual: "the elusive 'I' which confers self-awareness". The more general universal force, of which Kia is an aspect, Carroll termed 'Chaos': "The unity which appears to the mind to exert the twin functions of will and perception is called Kia by magicians. Sometimes it is called the spirit, or soul, or life force, instead... Kia is capable of occult power because it is a fragment of the great life force of the universe... The 'thing' responsible for the origin and continued action of events is called Chaos by magicians... Chaos... is the force which has caused life to evolve itself out of dust, and is currently most concentratedly manifest in the human life force, or Kia, where it is the source of consciousness... To the extent that the Kia can become one with Chaos it can extend its will and perception into the universe to accomplish magic".

Carroll split the concept of the Holy Guardian Angel in two and spoke of two Holy Guardian Angels. According to his work Liber Null and Psychonaut, one is the Augoeides, a projected image of whatever the magician strives for; the other is quantum uncertainty, which ultimately determines the acts of the magician and is a spark of the only true creative force, the chaos of chaos magic.

In 1995, Carroll announced his desire to step down from the "roles of magus and pontiff of chaos". This statement was originally delivered at the same IOT international meeting which Carroll discussed in an article titled "The Ice War" in Chaos International.

In 2005, he appeared as a chaos magic instructor at Maybe Logic Academy at the request of Robert Anton Wilson.

Carroll was keenly interested in both mathematics and theoretical physics. Over his later years he developed various elaborate hypotheses regarding three dimensional time, and hypersphere cosmology and published these ideas through his books and on his website. His final blog entry, on 1st April 2026, read: "I think I have a good chance of outliving the LCDM big bang theory."

Carroll died on 22 April 2026.

== Books ==
- Carroll, Peter J. (1987). Liber Null & Psychonaut: An Introduction to Chaos Magic. Weiser Books. ISBN 0-87728-639-6.
- Carroll, Peter J. (1992). Liber Kaos. Red Wheel/Weiser. ISBN 0-87728-742-2.
- Carroll, Peter J. (1996). Psybermagick: Advanced Ideas in Chaos Magick. New Falcon Publications. ISBN 1-56184-092-0.
- Carroll, Peter J. (2008). The Apophenion: A Chaos Magic Paradigm. Mandrake of Oxford. ISBN 978-1-869928-65-0.
- Carroll, Peter J. (2010). The Octavo: A Sorcerer-Scientist's Grimoire. Mandrake of Oxford. ISBN 978-1-906958-17-6.
- Carroll, Peter J. (2014). Epoch: The Esotericon & Portals of Chaos. Arcanorium College. ISBN 978-0992848828.
- Carroll, Peter J. (2022). Interview with a Wizard. Interviewed by Ian Blumberg-Enge. Mandrake of Oxford. ISBN 978-1914153143.
- Carroll, Peter J. (2025). This Is Chaos: Embracing the Future of Magic. Red Wheel/Weiser. ISBN 978-1-57863-873-4.

== See also ==
- The New Equinox – Ceremonial magic publication (1976–1982)
