= The New Equinox =

Ceremonial magic publication (1976–1982)

The New Equinox was a ceremonial magic publication founded in the mid-1970s by Peter J. Carroll and Ray Sherwin, whose main interest at that time was the magic of Aleister Crowley. It was published between 1976 and 1979. The magazine was based in East Morton in Yorkshire. Anthony Venables was joint editor for a few issues. He has a book shop on Haworth Main Street. Carroll, who later went on, with Ray Sherwin, to found the Illuminates of Thanateros, was a regular contributor.

The first report of the system known as English Qaballa (EQ) was published in The New Equinox in 1979 by Ray Sherwin in his final issue as editor. In an editorial, Sherwin reported that the "order & value of the English Alphabet" had been discovered by an English magician, James Lees, in November 1976.

James Lees subsequently assumed the role of publisher of The New Equinox and, starting in 1981, published additional material about the EQ system over the course of five issues of the journal, extending into 1982.

== See also ==
- Aleister Crowley bibliography
- The Equinox
