= Kenneth Grant (occultist) =

English occultist and writer (1924–2011)

- Grant in the library of his Golders Green home. Taken by Jan Magee in 1978.
- Born: 23 May 1924; Ilford, Essex, England
- Died: 15 January 2011 (aged 86)
- Occupations: Novelist, writer, ceremonial magician
- Spouse: Steffi Grant (m.1946–2011)

Kenneth Grant (23 May 1924 – 15 January 2011) was an English occultist, ceremonial magician, writer, and advocate of Thelema. He founded his own Thelemic organisation, the Typhonian Ordo Templi Orientis (later renamed the Typhonian Order) with his wife Steffi Grant.

Born in Ilford, England, Grant developed an interest in occultism and Eastern religions during his teenage years. After service with the British Army during the Second World War, he returned to Britain and became the personal secretary of Aleister Crowley, the founder of Thelema. Crowley instructed Grant in his esoteric practices and initiated him into his own occult order, Ordo Templi Orientis (O.T.O.). When Crowley died in 1947, Grant was seen as his heir apparent in Great Britain, and was appointed as such by the American head of O.T.O., Karl Germer. In 1949, Grant befriended the occult artist Austin Osman Spare, and in ensuing years helped to publicise Spare's work.

In 1954 Grant founded the London-based New Isis Lodge, through which he added to many of Crowley's Thelemic teachings, bringing in extraterrestrial themes and influences from the work of fantasy writer H. P. Lovecraft. This was anathema to Germer, who expelled Grant from O.T.O. in 1955, although the latter continued to operate his Lodge regardless until 1962. During the 1950s he also came to be increasingly interested in Hinduism, exploring the teachings of the Indian guru Ramana Maharshi and publishing a range of articles on the topic. He was particularly interested in Hindu tantric literature and Advaita Vedanta, incorporating them into Thelemic practices. On Germer's death in 1969, Grant proclaimed himself Outer Head of O.T.O. This title was disputed by the American Grady McMurtry, who took control of O.T.O. Grant's Order became known as the Typhonian Ordo Templi Orientis, operating from his home in Golders Green, London. In 1959 he began publishing on occultism and wrote the Typhonian Trilogies as well as various novels and books of poetry, much of which propagated the work of Crowley and Spare.

Grant's writings and teachings have proved a significant influence over other currents of occultism, including chaos magic, the Temple of Set, and the Dragon Rouge. They also attracted academic interest within the study of Western esotericism, particularly from Henrik Bogdan and Dave Evans.

== Biography ==
=== Early life and Aleister Crowley: 1924–1947 ===
Grant was born on 23 May 1924 in Ilford, Essex, the son of a Welsh clergyman. By his early teenage years, Grant had read widely on the subject of Western esotericism and Asian religions, including the work of prominent occultist Helena Blavatsky. He had made use of a personal magical symbol ever since being inspired to do so in a visionary dream he experienced in 1939; he spelled its name variously as A'ashik, Oshik, or Aossic. Aged 18, in the midst of the Second World War, Grant volunteered to join the British Army, later commenting that he hoped to be posted to British India, where he could find a spiritual guru to study under. He was never posted abroad, and was ejected from the army aged 20 due to an unspecified medical condition.

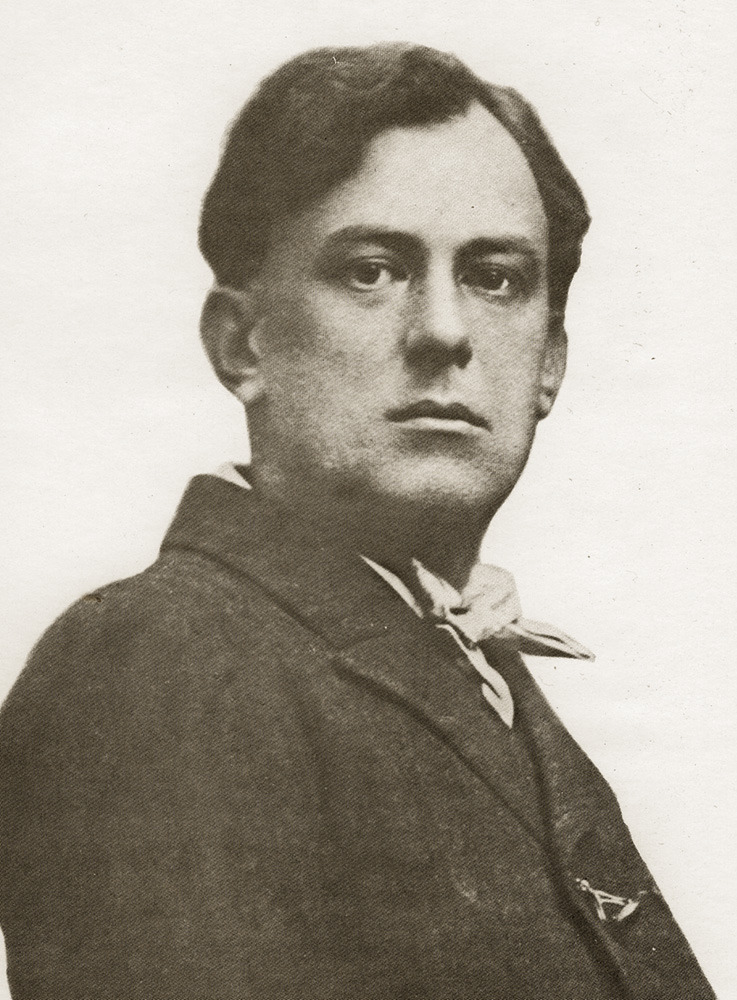
Aleister Crowley, who became Grant's guru.

Grant was fascinated by the work of the occultist Aleister Crowley, having read a number of his books. Eager to meet Crowley, Grant unsuccessfully wrote to Crowley's publishers, asking them to give him his address; however, the publisher had moved address themselves, meaning that they never received his letter. He also requested that Michael Houghton, proprietor of Central London's esoteric bookstore Atlantis Bookshop, introduce him to Crowley. Houghton refused, privately remarking that Grant was "mentally unstable." Grant later stated his opinion that Houghton had refused because he did not wish to "incur evil karma" from introducing the young man to Crowley, but later suggested that it was because Houghton desired him for his own organisation, The Order of Hidden Masters, and thereby did not want him to become Crowley's disciple. Persisting, Grant wrote letters to the new address of Crowley's publishers, asking that they pass his letters on to Crowley himself. These resulted in the first meeting between the two, in autumn 1944, at the Bell Inn in Buckinghamshire.

After several further meetings and an exchange of letters, Grant agreed to work for Crowley as his secretary and personal assistant. Now living in relative poverty, Crowley was unable to pay Grant for his services in money, instead paying him in magical instruction. In March 1945, Grant moved into a lodge cottage in the grounds of Netherwood, a Sussex boarding house where Crowley was living. He continued living there with Crowley for several months, dealing with the old man's correspondences and needs. In turn, he was allowed to read from Crowley's extensive library on occult subjects, and performed ceremonial magic workings with him, becoming a high initiate of Crowley's magical group, Ordo Templi Orientis (O.T.O.). Crowley saw Grant as a potential leader of O.T.O. in the UK, writing in his diary, "value of Grant. If I die or go to the USA, there must be a trained man to take care of the English O.T.O." However, they also argued, with Grant trying to convince Crowley to relocate to London. On one occasion Crowley shouted at him: "You are the most consummate BORE that the world has yet known. And this at 20!"

Grant's family disliked that he was working for no wage, and pressured him to resign, which he did in June 1945, leaving Netherwood. Crowley wrote to Grant's father, stating that he was "very sorry to part with Kenneth" and that he felt that Grant was "giving up his real future." To David Curwen, an O.T.O. member who was another of his correspondents, Crowley related his opinion that "I may have treated him too severely." Crowley put Curwen in contact with Grant, with Grant later claiming that he learned much from Curwen, particularly regarding the Kaula school of Tantra; in his later writings, he made reference to Curwen using his Order name of Frater Ani Abthilal. Although they continued to correspond with one another, Crowley and Grant never met again, for the former died in December 1947. Grant attended Crowley's funeral at a Brighton crematorium, while accompanied by his new wife, Steffi.

=== The New Isis Lodge and Austin Osman Spare: 1947–1969 ===
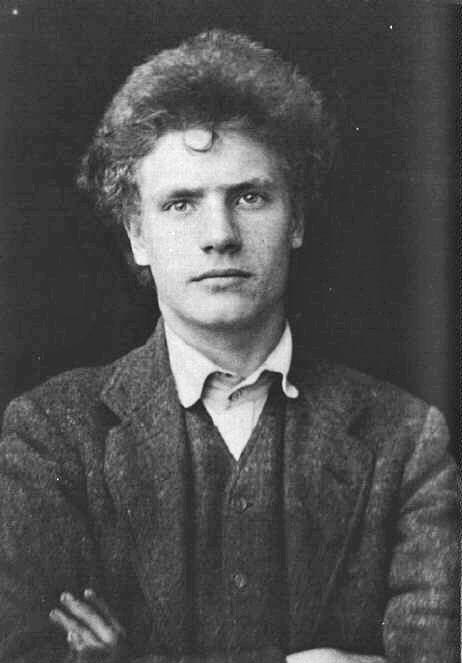
Grant befriended the occult artist Austin Osman Spare (pictured in 1904).

Steffi Grant introduced herself to the occult artist Austin Osman Spare in 1949, having learned about him while she was modelling for Herbert Budd, a tutor at St. Martin's School of Art who had studied alongside Spare. Steffi purchased two of Spare's artworks, which she gave to Kenneth as a present for his twenty-fifth birthday. She subsequently introduced her husband to Spare. At the time, Spare had fallen into poverty, living in obscurity in a South London flat. Although making some money as an artist and art tutor, he was largely financially supported by his friend Frank Letchford, whom he affectionately referred to as his "son". There was some animosity between Letchford and Grant, although it is apparent that Spare preferred the former, having known him for 12 years longer, and placing him first in his will. Grant desired a closer relationship, and in 1954 began signing his letters to Spare "thy son." Letchford claimed that Spare often told the Grants "white lies ... to boost a flagging ego." Grant's first published work represented a brief "appreciation" of Spare's work that was included in a catalogue for the artist's exhibition held at Temple Bar in London in 1949.

Grant had continued studying Crowley's work, and a year after Crowley's death was acknowledged as a Ninth Degree member of O.T.O. by Karl Germer, Crowley's successor as Head of O.T.O. Grant then successfully applied to Germer for a charter to operate the first three O.T.O. degrees and run his own lodge, which was granted in March 1951. As this would mean that his lodge would be the only chartered O.T.O. body in England at the time, Grant believed that it meant that he was now head of O.T.O. in Britain. Germer put Grant in contact with Wilfred Talbot Smith, an English Thelemite based in California who had founded the Agape Lodge, knowing that Smith was the only man who had practical knowledge of O.T.O. degree work. Smith was eager to help, and wrote at length on his experiences in founding a lodge, although he was made uneasy by Grant's magical seal of "Aossic" for reasons that have never been ascertained, and their correspondence soon petered out.

Grant began restructuring the system of O.T.O. by augmenting its grading structure with that of Crowley's other occult order, the A∴A∴. This attempt failed, as Grant's attentions were increasingly drawn into his founding and running of the New Isis Lodge. The lodge became operational in April 1955 when Grant issued a manifesto announcing his discovery of an extraterrestrial "Sirius/Set current" upon which the lodge was to be based. In this manifesto, Grant claimed that a new energy was emanating down from Earth from another planet which he identified with Nuit, a goddess who appears in the first chapter of Crowley's Thelemic holy text, The Book of the Law. Germer however deemed it "blasphemy" that Grant had identified a single planet with Nuit; on 20 July 1955, Germer issued a "Note of Expulsion" expelling Grant from O.T.O.

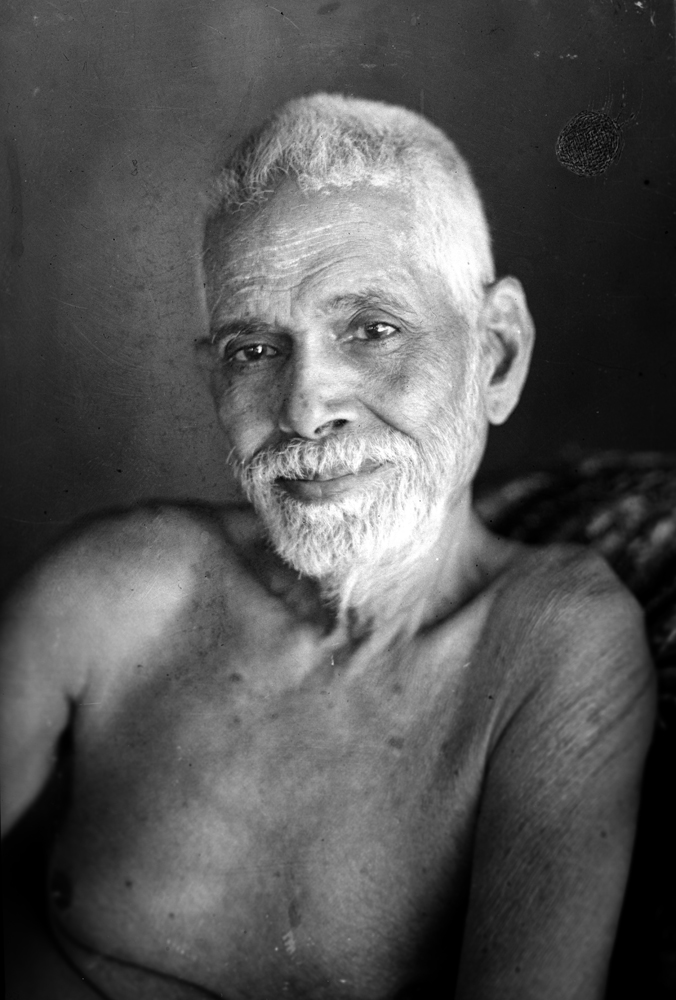
Grant became a follower of Indian guru Ramana Maharshi

Grant however ignored Germer's letter of expulsion, continuing to operate the New Isis Lodge under the claim that he had powers from the "Inner Plane". Upon learning of Grant's expulsion, Smith feared that O.T.O. would split up into warring factions much as the Theosophical Society had done following the death of Blavatsky. Grant's Lodge continued to operate until 1962. According to Grant, the group consisted of about thirty members and met every seventh Friday at the lodge's premises, which for a while were in the basement of Curwen's furrier's store at Melcombe Street, near to Baker Street in central London. During the period in which he worked with the lodge he claimed to have received two important texts from preternatural sources, the Wisdom of S'lba and OKBISh or The Book of the Spider.

From 1953 to 1961 Grant immersed himself in the study of Hinduism, becoming a follower of the Hindu guru Ramana Maharshi. He was also interested in the work of another Hindu teacher, Lord Kusuma Haranath, and was credited with encouraging and helping to create the three-volume Lord Haranath: A Biography by Akella Ramakrishna Sastri. He also authored articles on Advaita Vedanta and other Hindu topics for Indian journals like the Bombay-based The Call Divine, as well as for Richard Cavendish's Man, Myth & Magic. Many of these articles would be collected into a single anthology and published as At the Feet of the Guru in 2005. Grant believed that the O.T.O.'s sex magic teachings needed to be refashioned along tantric principles from Indian religion, in doing so relying heavily on Curwen's ideas about tantra.

After Spare's death, Grant began to focus more on his own writing career. From 1959 to 1963, Grant privately published the Carfax Monographs, a series of short articles on magic published in ten instalments, each at a limited print run of 100. Nine of these volumes included original artworks produced by Steffi, reflecting the increasing collaboration between husband and wife which would be reflected in many of Grant's subsequent publications. The Carfax Monographs would eventually be assembled together and re-released as Hidden Lore in 1989. In 1966 he also privately published a small book of his poems, Black to Black and Other Poems. During the 1950s and 1960s Grant also authored a number of novellas, although these would only be published by Starfire Publishing between 1997 and 2012.

=== Typhonian O.T.O. and growing fame: 1970–2011 ===
Of all OHO contenders, [Grant] made the greatest effort to expand and build upon Crowley's work rather than confine himself to the letter of the law. During the 1970s, he was only one of a handful of people editing material by Crowley and Austin Spare, and he was practically alone in offering new contributions to the literature of magick. While his system differs considerably from Crowley's, he gets high marks for originality.

— Crowley biographer Richard Kaczynski, 2010.

In 1969, Grant co-edited The Confessions of Aleister Crowley for publication with Crowley's literary executor John Symonds. Over the coming years he edited – often with Symonds – a range of Crowley writings for republication, resulting in the release of The Magical Record of the Beast 666 (1972), Diary of a Drug Fiend (1972), Moonchild (1972), Magick (1973), Magical and Philosophical Commentaries on The Book of the Law (1974) and The Complete Astrological Writings (1974). The release of these publications has been described as being "instrumental in the revival of interest in Crowley".

At this point, Grant began describing himself as O.H.O. (Outer Head of the Order) of O.T.O., claiming that he deserved this title not by direct succession from Crowley but because he displayed the inspiration and innovation that Germer lacked. A document purportedly by Crowley naming Grant as his successor was subsequently exposed as a hoax created by Robert Taylor, a Typhonian O.T.O. member. In the early 1970s he established his own Thelemic organisation, the Typhonian O.T.O., which produced its first official announcement in 1973. Although adopting the O.T.O. degree system used by Crowley, Grant removed the rituals of initiation designed to allow a member to enter a higher degree; instead he personally promoted them through the degrees according to what he believed were their own personal spiritual development.

In 1972, Frederick Muller Limited published the first book in Grant's "Typhonian Trilogies" series, The Magical Revival, in which he discussed various events within the history of Western esotericism while also encouraging future interest in the subject. He followed this with a sequel published in 1973, Aleister Crowley and the Hidden God, in which he examined Crowley's sex magical practices and the Tantra. This was followed in 1975 by Cults of the Shadow, which brought the first Typhonian Trilogy to an end with a discussion of the left-hand path in magic, making reference to both Crowley and Spare's work, as well as to West African Vodún and Tantra. That same year, Grant also published Images and Oracles of Austin Osman Spare, a collection of his late friend's images based on 20 years of research. The volume did not sell well, with much of the stock being remaindered, although became a rare collector's item in later years. Grant had begun work on the book many years before and had agreed for 500 copies to be published by Trigram Press Ltd in 1967, although at the last minute the project was cancelled. He had also authored new introductions for re-releases of two of Spare's works, a 1973 publication of The Anathema of Zos and a 1975 release of The Book of Pleasure.

The works of Kenneth Grant are fashioned out of the stuff of dreams. The neat and orderly appearance on the shelves of the Typhonian Trilogies gives no hint of the eldritch worlds they contain. One opens each volume with a sense of wonder, and one finishes them with the material for nightmares and visions of worlds yet unborn.

— Martin P. Starr, 2003.

In 1977, Grant began the second Typhonian Trilogy with Nightside of Eden, in which he discussed some of his own personal magical ideas, outlining magical formulae with which to explore a dark, dense realm that he variously called 'Universe B' and 'the Tunnels of Set', conceived as a 'dark side' of the Qabalistic Tree of Life. Grant made connections between this realm and the extramundane deities of H. P. Lovecraft's horror fiction. The book proved controversial among occultists and Thelemites, and starkly divided opinion. The sequel appeared in 1980 as Outside the Circles of Time, and introduced Grant's thoughts on the relevance of Ufology and insectoid symbolism for occultism. This would prove to be the final Grant volume published by Muller, who would merge with Blond and Briggs in 1984, while the publishing rights to his works reverted to him the following year. His next book would not appear for another eleven years after Outside the Circles of Time.

In 1989, Grant began his relationship with Skoob Books Limited, a publisher linked to the Skoob Books bookstore in Bloomsbury, central London which had begun to develop a line of esoteric titles under the leadership of Caroline Wise and Chris Johnson. In 1991, Skoob Books published Grant's Remembering Aleister Crowley, a volume containing his memoirs of Crowley alongside reproductions of diary entries, photographs, and letters. From 1989 to 1994, Skoob reissued a number of Grant's earlier books, and in 1992 published the sixth volume in the Typhonian Trilogies, Hecate's Fountain, in which Grant provided many anecdotes about working in the New Isis Lodge and focused on describing accidents and fatalities that he believed were caused by magic. The seventh volume of the Typhonian Trilogies, Outer Gateways, followed in 1994, discussing Grant's ideas of older Typhonian traditions from across the world, with reference to the work of Crowley, Spare, and Lovecraft. It ends with the text of The Wisdom of S'lba, a work that Grant claimed he had received clairvoyantly from a supernatural source.

After Skoob Books closed its esoteric publishing division, in 1996 Grant transferred the publishing rights of his books to two companies, Starfire Publishing – which decided to bring out his trilogies and novellas – and Fulgur Limited, which published his work on Spare. In 1997 Starfire published Grant's first novel, Against the Light: A Nightside Narrative, which involved a character also named "Kenneth Grant". He asserted that the work was "quasi-autobiographical", but never specified which parts were based on his life and which were fictional. In 1998, Starfire published a book co-written by Grant and his wife Steffi, titled Zos Speaks! Encounters with Austin Osman Spare, in which they included 7 years' worth of diary entries, letters, and photographs pertaining to their relationship with the artist. The following year, the next volume in the Typhonian Trilogies, Beyond the Mauve Zone was published, explaining Grant's ideas on a realm known as the Mauve Zone that he claimed to have explored. A book containing two novellas, Snakewand and the Darker Strain, was published in 2000, while the final volume of the Typhonian Trilogies, The Ninth Arch, was published in 2003. It offered further Qabalistic interpretations of the work of Crowley, Spare, and Lovecraft, and the text of another work that Grant claimed had been given to him from a supernatural source, Book of the Spider. That same year, Grant also published two further volumes of fictional stories, Gamaliel and Dance, Doll, Dance!, which told the story of a vampire and a Tantric sex group, and The Other Child, and Other Tales, which contained six short stories.

Grant died on 15 January 2011 after a period of illness. He was survived by his wife.

== Beliefs and teachings ==
In his body of work, Grant has created an unlikely mélange comprised of thematic threads that include both Eastern and Western esoteric traditions, in addition to consistent references to artistic and literary works infused with the aroma of the mysterious, fantastic, and uncanny, with a dominant place assigned to the fictional output of H. P. Lovecraft and the visionary creations of Austin O. Spare.

— Religion scholar Gordan Djurdjevic.

Grant drew eclectically on a range of sources in devising his teachings. Although based in Thelema, Grant's Typhonian tradition has been described as "a bricolage of occultism, Neo-Vedanta, Hindu tantra, Western sexual magic, Surrealism, ufology and Lovecraftian gnosis". According to Djurdjevic, Grant's writing style is notorious for being opaque with "verbal and conceptual labyrinths". The historian of religion Manon Hedenborg White noted that "Grant's writings do not lend themselves easily to systematization". She added that he "deliberately employs cryptic or circuitous modes of argumentation", and lacks clear boundaries between fact and fiction.

Grant promoted what he termed the Typhonian or Draconian tradition of magic, and wrote that Thelema was only a recent manifestation of this wider tradition. In his books, he portrayed the Typhonian tradition as the world's oldest spiritual tradition, suggesting that it had ancient roots in Africa. In Central Africa during prehistory, he believed there had been a primordial serpent cult devoted to the worship of a goddess known as Ta-Urt or Typhon, from which the Typhonian tradition stems. This was an idea he had adopted from Gerald Massey's 1881 publication A Book of Beginnings, a work promoting ideas which had never been accepted among scholars of religion. According to Grant, Typhonianism was typified by its worship of female deities and its use of sex as a method of spiritual achievement. He wrote that this tradition spread throughout the world, forming the basis of the ancient Egyptian religion, as well as Hindu and Buddhist tantra and forms of Western esotericism. He added that for millennia, the Typhonian tradition has been opposed by the "Osirians" or "Solarites", practitioners of a patriarchal solar religion, who have portrayed the Typhonians as evil, corrupt, and debauched. The religious studies scholar Gordan Djurdjevic noted that Grant's Typhonian history was "at best highly speculative" and lacked any supporting evidence, though he also suggests that Grant may never have intended for it to be taken literally.

Grant adopted a perennialist interpretation of the history of religion. Grant's claims that Indian spiritual traditions like tantra and yoga correlate to Western esoteric traditions, and that both stem from a core, ancient source, has parallels in the perennial philosophy promoted by the Traditionalist School of Western esotericists. However, Grant differed from Traditionalists like René Guénon and Ananda Coomaraswamy in his positive assessment of Western esotericism. Moreover, Grant's appreciation of Asian spiritual traditions has much in common with Theosophy, although Grant differed from the Theosophical movement with his valorisation of the left-hand path.

Influenced by Maharshi, Grant adopted the Advaitan worldview that only "the Self", or atman, really exists, with the wider universe being an illusory projection. He believed that by mastering magic, one masters this illusory universe, gaining personal liberation and recognising that only the Self really exists. Doing so, according to Grant, leads to the discovery of one's True Will, the central focus of Thelema. Grant further claimed that the realm of the Self was known as "the Mauve Zone", and that it could be reached while in a state of deep sleep, where it has the symbolic appearance of a swamp. He also believed that the reality of consciousness, which he deemed the only true reality, was formless and thus presented as a void, although he also taught that it was symbolised by the Hindu goddess Kali and the Thelemic goddess Nuit.

Grant's views on sex magic drew heavily on the importance of sexual dimorphism among humans and the subsequent differentiation of gender roles. Grant taught that the true secret of sex magic were bodily secretions, the most important of which was a woman's menstrual blood. In this he differed from Crowley, who viewed semen as the most important genital secretion. Grant referred to female sexual secretions as kalas, a term adopted from Sanskrit. He thought that because women possess kalas, they have oracular and visionary powers. The magical uses of female genital secretions are a recurring theme in Grant's writings. He believed that the XI° degree O.T.O. ritual, which Crowley argued necessitated anal sex, should instead involve vaginal sex with a menstruating woman. He was critical of Crowley's use of anal sex in rituals, stating his view that the "sodomitical formula" was "a perversion of magical practice". These views have brought accusations of homophobia from later occultists such as Phil Hine.

== Personal life ==
Grant was a reclusive figure. Unlike many of his contemporaries, he did not lecture publicly. Janine Chapman, an esotericist who met Grant during the 1970s, described him as "an attractive, well-mannered, well-dressed man in his forties, intelligent, cultivated, and friendly."

== Legacy ==
The historian of religion Dave Evans considers Grant "certainly unique" in the history of British esotericism because of his "close dealings" with Crowley, Spare, and Gerald Gardner (the founder of Wicca), the "three most influential Western occultists of the 20th century." The occultist and comic book author Alan Moore thought it "hard to name" any other living individual who "has done more to shape contemporary western thinking with regard to Magic" than Grant, and characterized the Typhonian O.T.O. as "a schoolboy gone berserk on brimstone aftershave."

In 2003, the historian of Western esotericism Henrik Bogdan expressed the view that Grant was "perhaps (the) most original and prolific English author of the post-modern occultist genre." Djurdjevic stated that Grant's engagement with Indian spiritual traditions was "both substantial and innovative" as well as controversial, while adding that Grant's emphasis on the importance of female sexual fluids helped contribute to the "transformation of the hegemonic masculinity" in Western occultism.

Although membership of Grant's own occult groups remained small, his Typhonian Thelemic system held a significant influence over various other occult groups and currents, including chaos magic, the Temple of Set, the Dragon Rouge, and Andrew D. Chumbley's Cultus Sabbati. The anthropologist Justin Woodman noted that Grant was "one of the key figures" for bringing H. P. Lovecraft's literary works into magical theory and practice, adding that his writings were a "formative influence" on Lovecraftian occult groups like the Esoteric Order of Dagon, founded in North America during the late 1980s.

The occultist Peter Levenda discussed Grant's work in his 2013 essay, The Dark Lord: H. P. Lovecraft, Kenneth Grant, and the Typhonian Tradition in Magic. Here, he asserted that Grant's importance was in attempting to create "a more global character for Thelema" by introducing ideas and concepts borrowed from the Hindu tantra, Yazidism, and Afro-Caribbean religions.

== Bibliography ==
Grant published his work over a period of five decades, providing both a synthesis of Crowley and Spare's work and new, often idiosyncratic interpretations of them. Evans described Grant as having "an often confusing, oblique, and sanity-challenging writing style" that blends fictional stories with accounts of real-life people.

In 2003, Bogdan's first edition of a Grant bibliography was published by Academia Esoterica Press. This was followed by a second, updated edition in 2015, which contained a full biography of Grant's work:

=== Non-fiction ===
Year of publication	Title	Series	Publisher
1959	The Tree of Life	Carfax Monograph #1	Privately Published (London)
1959	The Golden Dawn	Carfax Monograph #2	Privately Published (London)
1960	Aleister Crowley	Carfax Monograph #3	Privately Published (London)
1960	Austin Osman Spare	Carfax Monograph #4	Privately Published (London)
1961	Vinum Sabbati	Carfax Monograph #5	Privately Published (London)
1961	Mage and Image	Carfax Monograph #6	Privately Published (London)
1962	Hidden Lore	Carfax Monograph #7	Privately Published (London)
1962	Yetzirah	Carfax Monograph #8	Privately Published (London)
1963	Magical Creation	Carfax Monograph #9	Privately Published (London)
1963	Vault of the Adepts	Carfax Monograph #10	Privately Published (London)
1972	The Magical Revival	Typhonian Trilogies #1	Frederick Muller (London)
1973	Aleister Crowley and the Hidden God	Typhonian Trilogies #2	Frederick Muller (London)
1975	Images and Oracles of Austin Osman Spare	-	Frederick Muller (London)
1975	Cults of the Shadow	Typhonian Trilogies #3	Frederick Muller (London)
1977	Nightside of Eden	Typhonian Trilogies #4	Fredrick Muller (London)
1980	Outside the Circles of Time	Typhonian Trilogies #5	Frederick Muller (London)
1989	Hidden Lore	Collected Carfax Monographs	Skoob Books (London)
1991	Remembering Aleister Crowley	-	Skoob Books (London)
1992	Hecate's Fountain	Typhonian Trilogies #6	Skoob Books (London)
1994	Outer Gateways	Typhonian Trilogies #7	Skoob Books (London)
1998	Zos Speaks! Encounters with Austin Osman Spare	-	Fulgur Limited (London)
1999	Beyond the Mauve Zone	Typhonian Trilogies #8	Starfire Publishing (London)
2002	The Ninth Arch	Typhonian Trilogies #9	Starfire Publishing (London)
2006	At the Feet of the Guru	-	Starfire Publishing (London)

=== Fiction ===
Year of publication	Title	Publisher
1997	Against the Light	Starfire Publishing (London)
2000	Snakewand and The Darker Strain	Starfire Publishing (London)
2003	Gamaliel: The Diary of a Vampire and Dance, Doll, Dance!	Starfire Publishing (London)
2003	The Other Child and Other Tales	Starfire Publishing (London)
2012	Grist to Whose Mill? A Novel of Nemesis	Starfire Publishing (London)

=== Poetry ===
Year of publication	Title	Publisher
1963	Black to Black and Other Poems	Carfax (London)
1970	The Gull's Beak and Other Poems	Toucan Press (Mount Durand, Guernsey)
2005	Convolvulus and Other Poems	Starfire Publishing (London)
