= Austin Osman Spare =

English artist (1886–1956)

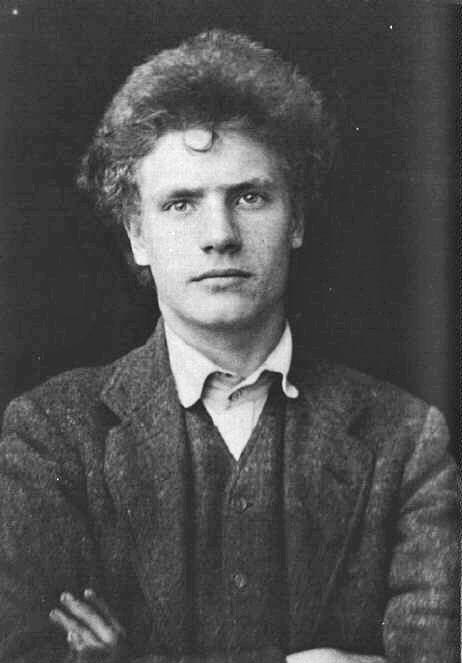
- Spare in 1904
- Born: 30 December 1886; London, England
- Died: 15 May 1956 (aged 69); London, England
- Education: Royal College of Art
- Known for: Drawing, painting, occultism
- Movement: Symbolism, proto-surrealism
- Patrons: Lord Howard de Walden, Charles Ricketts, Marc-André Raffalovich, John Gray, Aleister Crowley
- Website: Austin Osman Spare – Art UK

Austin Osman Spare (30 December 1886 – 15 May 1956) was an English artist and occultist who worked as a draughtsman, writer and painter. Influenced by symbolism and Art Nouveau, his art was known for its clear use of line (Note: "In the verity of his visionary productions we find him of the company of Blake and Fuseli and their circle; but far superior to any of them in the mastery of representational craft." His chaotic magical art is a dynamic framework of Tantric energy—which is to say contains absolute, real, ambivalent and of cosmological transcendental—proportions. It is similar to the language amalgamations in the book of Abramelin. Haydn Mackey, commenting in a radio program broadcast shortly after Spare's death, and; "There now hang on one of my walls seven of his paintings, each so different in style and character that it is almost impossible to believe that the same hand was responsible for any two of them. And there rest on a table in my sitting-room overlooking Trafalgar Square three sketchbooks full of 'automatic drawings' unique in their mastery of line, unique, too, in their daring of conception." Hannen Swaffer, "The Mystery of an Artist" in London Mystery Magazine, Vol. 1, No. 5, Hulton Press, 1950.) and its depiction of monstrous and sexual imagery. In an occult capacity, he developed magical techniques including automatic writing, automatic drawing and sigilization based on his theories of the relationship between the conscious and unconscious self.

Born into a working-class family in Snow Hill in London, Spare grew up in Smithfield and then Kennington, taking an early interest in art. Gaining a scholarship to study at the Royal College of Art in South Kensington, he trained as a draughtsman, while also taking a personal interest in theosophy and Western esotericism, becoming briefly involved with Aleister Crowley and his A∴A∴. Developing his own personal occult philosophy, he wrote a series of occult grimoires, namely Earth Inferno (1905), The Book of Pleasure (1913) and The Focus of Life (1921). Alongside a string of personal exhibitions, he also achieved much press attention for being the youngest entrant at the 1904 Royal Academy summer exhibition.

After publishing a short-lived art magazine, Form, during the First World War he was conscripted into the armed forces and worked as an official war artist. Spare attempted to revive Form after the war before shifting his efforts to The Golden Hind, in partnership with Clifford Bax. Moving to various working class areas of South London over the following decades, Spare lived in poverty, but continued exhibiting his work to varying degrees of success. With the arrival of surrealism onto the London art scene during the 1930s, critics and the press once more took an interest in his work, seeing it as an early precursor to surrealist imagery. Losing his home during the Blitz, he fell into relative obscurity following the Second World War, although he continued exhibiting until his death in 1956.

Spare's spiritualist legacy was largely maintained by his friend, the Thelemite author Kenneth Grant, in the latter part of the 20th century, and his beliefs regarding sigils provided a key influence on the chaos magic movement and Thee Temple ov Psychick Youth. Spare's art once more began to receive attention in the 1970s, due to a renewed interest in Art Nouveau in Britain, with several retrospective exhibitions being held in London.

== Biography ==
=== Childhood: 1886–1900 ===
Austin's father, Philip Newton Spare, was born in Yorkshire in 1857, and moved to London, where he gained employment with the City of London Police in 1878, being stationed at Snow Hill Police Station. Austin's mother, Eliza Osman, was born in Devon, the daughter of a Royal Marine, and married Philip Newton Spare at St Bride's Church in Fleet Street in December 1879. Their first child to survive was John Newton Spare, born in 1882, with William Herbert Spare following in 1883 and then Susan Ann Spare in 1885.

The couple's fourth surviving child, Austin Osman Spare, was born shortly after four o'clock on the morning of 30 December 1886. Spare attended St. Agnes School, attached to a prominent High Anglican church, and as a child he was brought up within the Anglican denomination of Christianity. Taking an interest in drawing, from about the age of 12, he began taking evening classes at Lambeth School of Art under the tutorship of Philip Connard.

=== Artistic training: 1900–1905 ===
In 1900, Spare began working as a designer at Powell's glass-working business in Whitefriars Street, which had links to the Arts and Crafts movement and William Morris. In the evenings he attended the Lambeth School of Art. Two visitors to Powell's, Sir William Blake Richmond and FH Richmond RBA, came across some of Spare's drawings, and, impressed by them, they recommended him for a scholarship to the Royal College of Art (RCA) in South Kensington. He achieved further attention when his drawings were exhibited in the British Art Section of the St. Louis Exposition and the Paris International Exhibition, and in 1903 he won a silver medal at the National Competition of Schools of Art, where the judges, who included Walter Crane and Byam Shaw, praised his "remarkable sense of colour and great vigour of conception."

Soon, he began studying at the RCA, but was dissatisfied with the teaching he received there, becoming a truant and being disciplined by his tutors as a result. Influenced by the work of Charles Ricketts, Edmund Sullivan, George Frederic Watts and Aubrey Beardsley, his artistic style focused on clear lines, which was in stark contrast to the College's emphasis on shading. Still living in his parents' home, he began dressing in unconventional and flamboyant garb, and became popular with other students at the college, with a particularly strong friendship developing between Spare and Sylvia Pankhurst, a prominent Suffragette and leftist campaigner.

After becoming a practising occultist, he wrote and illustrated his first grimoire, Earth Inferno (1905), in which he took as his premise Blavatsky's idea that Earth already was Hell. The work exhibited a variety of influences, including theosophy, the Bible, Omar Khayyam, Dante's Inferno and his own mystical ideas regarding Zos and Kia.

In May 1904, Spare held his first public art exhibition in the foyer of the Newington Public Library in Walworth Road. Here, his paintings illustrated many of the themes that would continue to inspire him throughout his life, including his mystical views about Zos and Kia. His father then surreptitiously submitted two of Spare's drawings to the Royal Academy, one of which, a design for a bookplate, was accepted for exhibition at that year's prestigious summer exhibition. Journalists from the British press took a particular interest in his work, highlighting the fact that, at seventeen years of age, he was the youngest artist in the exhibition, with some erroneously claiming that he was the youngest artist to ever exhibit at the show. In 1905, he left the RCA without having received any qualifications.

=== Early career: 1906–1910 ===
Having left higher education, Spare became employed as a bookplate designer and illustrator, with his first book commission being for Ethel Rolt Wheeler's Behind the Veil, published by the company David Nutt in 1906. In ensuing years he would also illustrate such texts as Charles Grindrod's The Shadow of the Raggedstone (1909) and Justice Darling's On the Oxford Circuit and other Verses (1909). In 1905, he once more exhibited at the Royal Academy's summer exhibition, having submitted a drawing known as The Resurrection of Zoroaster, featuring beaked serpents swirling around the figure of the ancient Persian philosopher who founded Zoroastrianism. Diversifying his employment, In 1906, Spare published his first political cartoon, a satire on the use of Chinese wage slave labourers in British South Africa, which appeared in the pages of The Morning Leader newspaper. When not involved in these jobs, he devoted much of his time to illustrating a second publication, A Book of Satyrs, which consisted of a series of nine satirical images lampooning such institutions as politics and the clergy. The volume contained a number of self-portraits; he also filled many of the images with illustrations of bric-a-brac, of which he was a great collector. The book was finished off with an introduction authored by Scottish painter James Guthrie. Proud of his son's achievement, Spare's father would later inquire as to whether the publisher John Lane of Bodley Head would be interested in re-printing A Book of Satyrs, leading to the release of an expanded second edition in 1909. Meanwhile, in 1907 Spare produced one of his most significant illustrations, a drawing titled Portrait of the Artist, featuring himself sitting behind a table covered in assorted bric-a-brac.

Spare's Portrait of the Artist (1907). An "important self-portrait", it would later be bought by Led Zeppelin guitarist Jimmy Page.

In October 1907 Spare held his first major exhibition, titled simply "Black and White Drawings by Austin O. Spare", at the Bruton Gallery in London's West End. Attracting widespread interest and sensational views in the press, he was widely compared to Aubrey Beardsley, with reviewers commenting on what they saw as the eccentric and grotesque nature of his work. The World commented that "his inventive faculty is stupendous and terrifying in its creative flow of impossible horrors", while The Observer noted that "Mr. Spare's art is abnormal, unhealthy, wildly fantastic and unintelligible".

One of those attracted to Spare's work was Aleister Crowley (1875–1947), an occultist who had founded the religion of Thelema in 1904, taking as its basis Crowley's The Book of the Law. Crowley introduced himself to Spare, becoming a patron and champion of his art, which he proclaimed to be a message from the Divine. Spare subsequently submitted several drawings for publication in Crowley's Thelemite journal, The Equinox, receiving payment in the form of an expensive ritual robe. Spare would also be invited to join Crowley's new Thelemite magical order, the A∴A∴ or Argenteum Astrum, which had been co-founded with George Cecil Jones in 1907. Becoming the seventh member of the order in July 1907, where he used the magical name of Yihovaeum, it was through doing so that he befriended the occultist Victor Neuburg. Although he remained in A∴A∴ until 1912, ultimately Spare never became a full member, disliking Crowley's emphasis on strict hierarchy and organisation and becoming heavily critical of the practice of ceremonial magic. In turn, Crowley would claim that Spare was only interested in "black magic" and for that reason had kept him back from fully entering the Order.

Spare's major patron during this period was the wealthy property developer Pickford Waller, although other admirers included Desmond Coke, Ralph Strauss, Lord Howard de Walden and Charles Ricketts. Spare became popular among avant-garde homosexual circles in Edwardian London, with several known gay men becoming patrons of his work. In particular he became good friends with the same-sex couple Marc-André Raffalovich and John Gray, with Spare later characterising the latter as "the most wonderful man I have ever met." Gray would introduce Spare to the Irish novelist George Moore, whom he would subsequently befriend. The actual nature of Spare's sexuality at the time remains debated; his friend Frank Brangwyn would later claim that he was "strongly" homosexual but had suppressed these leanings. In contrast to this, in later life Spare would refer to a wide variety of heterosexual encounters that took place at this time, including with an intersex person, a dwarf with a protuberant forehead and a Welsh maid.

=== Marriage and The Book of Pleasure: 1911–1916 ===
"Ascension of the Ego from Ecstasy to Ecstasy", an image taken from The Book of Pleasure (1913). now owned by The Viktor Wynd Museum of Curiosities, Fine Art & Natural History

On one occasion, Spare met a middle-aged woman named Mrs Shaw in a pub in Mayfair. Eager to marry off her daughter, who already had one child from an earlier relationship, Mrs Shaw soon introduced Spare to her child, Eily Gertrude Shaw (1888–1938). Spare fell in love, producing a number of portraits of Eily, before marrying her on 4 September 1911. However, the relationship between Spare and his wife was strained; unlike him, she was "unintellectual and materialistic", and disliked many of his friends, particularly the younger males, asking him to cease his association with them.

Around 1910, Spare illustrated The Starlit Mire, a book of epigrams written by two doctors, James Bertram and F. Russell, in which his illustrations once more displayed his interest in the abnormal and the grotesque. Another notable work from this period was an illustration known as A Fantasy, which included a self-portrait of Spare surrounded by a variety of horned animals and a horned hermaphrodite creature, visually depicting his belief in the innate mental connection between humanity and our non-human ancestors.

Over a period of several years, Spare began work on his third tome, The Book of Pleasure (Self Love): The Psychology of Ecstasy, which he self-published in 1913. Exploring his own mystical ideas regarding the human being and their unconscious mind, it also discussed magic and the use of sigils. "Conceived initially as a pictorial allegory the book quickly evolved into a much deeper work, drawing inspiration from Taoism and Buddhism, but primarily from his experiences as an artist." The book sold poorly, and received a mixed review from the Times Literary Supplement, which while accepting Spare's "technical mastery", was more critical of much of the content.

In 1914, Spare was involved in a newly launched popular art magazine known as Colour, which was edited in Victoria Street, submitting a number of contributions to its early issues. He soon developed the idea of founding his own art magazine, suggesting the idea to the publisher John Lane, who had formerly produced The Yellow Book, an influential periodical that had appeared between 1894 and 1897. Envisioning his new venture, titled Form, as a successor to The Yellow Book, he was joined as co-editor by the etcher Frederick Carter, who used the pseudonym of Francis Marsden. The first issue appeared in the summer of 1916, containing contributions from Edmund Joseph Sullivan, Walter de la Mare, Frank Brangwyn, W. H. Davies, J. C. Squire, Ricketts and Shannon. Spare and Carter co-wrote an article discussing automatic writing, arguing that it allowed the unconscious part of the mind to produce art, a theme that Spare had previously dealt with in The Book of Pleasure. Generally, Form was poorly received by the critics and the public, being described as a "very horrible publication" by George Bernard Shaw, who proclaimed its design and layout to be "ancient Morrisian" and thereby out of fashion.

=== World War I, The Focus of Life and The Anathema of Zos: 1917–1927 ===
In 1917, with the First World War still raging, Spare was conscripted into the Royal Army Medical Corps, where he worked as a medical orderly. Later, he was appointed to the position of Acting Staff-Sergeant, and given the task of illustrating the conflict along with other artists based in a studio at 76 Fulham Road.

Spare was demobilized in 1919. Although they never gained a divorce, Spare had separated from his wife Eily, who had begun a relationship with another man. Focusing on the writing and illustration of a new book, 1921 saw the publication of The Focus of Life: The Mutterings of AOS by Morland Press. Edited and introduced by Frederick Carter, the book once more dealt with Spare's mystical ideas, continuing many of the themes explored in The Book of Pleasure. (Note: Reissued with additional material including poems by Aleister Crowley as And Now for Reality. Oxon: Mandrake Press, 1990.) The success of this book led Spare to decide to revive Form, with the first issue appearing in a new format in October 1921, edited by Spare and his friend W. H. Davies. Intended to be populist in tone, contributions came from Sidney Sime, Robert Graves, Herbert Furst, Laura Knight, Frank Brangwyn, Glyn Philpot, Edith Sitwell, Walter de la Mare, J. F. C. Fuller and Havelock Ellis. However, Spare discontinued the magazine after the third issue, which was published in January 1922. He then moved on the production of another art journal, The Golden Hind, co-edited with Clifford Bax and published by Chapman and Hall. The first issue appeared in October 1922, featuring a lithograph from Spare titled "The New Eden". Faced with problems, the journal eventually decreased in size from a folio to a quarto, and in 1924 it folded after eight issues.

The summer of 1924 saw Spare produce a sketchbook of "automatic drawings" titled The Book of Ugly Ecstasy, which contained a series of grotesque creatures; the sole copy of the book would be purchased by the art historian Gerald Reitlinger. The spring of 1925 then saw the production of a similar sketchbook, A Book of Automatic Drawings, and then a further suite of pictures, titled The Valley of Fear. He also began work on a new book, a piece of automatic writing titled The Anathema of Zos: The Sermon to the Hypocrites, which served as a criticism of British society influenced by the ideas of German philosopher Friedrich Nietzsche. Spare would self-publish it in an edition of 100 copies from his sister's house in Goodmayes, Essex, in 1927. (Note: Reissued: London: Museum Press, 1976 (facsimile; 500 numbered copies).)

=== Surrealism and World War II: 1927–1945 ===
Spare held exhibitions of his work at the St. George's Gallery in Hanover Square in 1927, and then at the Lefevre Gallery in 1929, but his work received little praise in the press or attention from the public. Living in poverty and with his work becoming unpopular in the mainstream London art scene, Spare contemplated suicide. He then undertook a series of anamorphic portraits, predominantly of young women, which he termed the "Experiments in Reality". Influenced by the work of El Greco, they were exhibited at the Godfrey Phillips Galleries in St James's, Central London in November 1930, an exhibit that proved to be Spare's last in London's West End.

Surrealism took an interest in automatism and the unconscious, and the reporter Hubert Nicholson ran a story on Spare titled "Father of Surrealism – He's a Cockney!". Jumping onto this new craze for surrealism, Spare released a set of what he described as "SURREALIST Racing Forecast Cards" for use in divination. The renewed interest benefited him, with his 1936, 1937 and 1938 exhibitions in Walworth Road proving a success, and he began teaching students at his studio in what he called his Austin Spare School of Draughtsmanship.

When the Second World War broke out against Nazi Germany in 1939, Spare, an ardent anti-Nazi, tried to enlist into the army, but was deemed too old. In the ensuing Blitz of London by the German Luftwaffe, Spare's flat and all the artwork in it was destroyed by a bomb on 10 May 1941, leaving him temporarily homeless.

=== Kenneth Grant and later life: 1946–1956 ===
Following the culmination of the war, Spare held a comeback show in November 1947 at the Archer Gallery. A commercial success, the works on display showed the increasing influence of Spiritualism on his thought, and included a number of portraits of prominent Spiritualists like Arthur Conan Doyle and Kate Fox-Jencken. He also featured a number of portraits of famous movie stars in the exhibit, leading him to later gain the moniker of "the first British Pop Artist".

In the spring of 1949, a recently married woman named Steffi Grant introduced herself to Spare. She introduced him to her husband Kenneth Grant (1924–2011). Spare and the Grants became great friends, frequenting a number of London pubs together and sharing books on the subject of the esoteric.

The Grants' influence led Spare to begin writing several new occult manuscripts, the Logomachy of Zos and the Zoetic Grimoire of Zos. Under Grant's influence, Spare began to show an increasing interest in witchcraft and the Witches' Sabbath, producing artworks with titles such as Witchery, Walpurgis Vampire and Satiated Succubi, and claiming that on a bus he had encountered a group of female witches on their way to the Sabbath.

Spare held his first pub show at the Temple Bar in Walworth Road in late 1949, which again proved successful, earning Spare 250 guineas. One of those who had seen the show was publisher Michael Hall, and impressed by Spare's work, he commissioned him to help provide illustrations for his new periodical, The London Mystery Magazine. The fifth issue, for August–September 1950, contained an article on Spare and his work, while the sixth contained an article written by Algernon Blackwood that was illustrated by Spare.

== As artist ==
Spare's work is remarkable for its variety, including paintings, a vast number of drawings, work with pastel, a few etchings, published books combining text with imagery, and even bizarre bookplates. He was productive from his earliest years until his death. According to Haydn Mackay, "rhythmic ornament grew from his hand seemingly without conscious effort."

Spare was regarded as an artist of considerable talent and good prospects, but his style was apparently controversial. Critical reaction to his work in period ranged from baffled but impressed, to patronizing and dismissive. An anonymous review of The Book of Satyrs published in December 1909, which must have appeared around the time of Spare's 23rd birthday, is by turns condescending and grudgingly respectful, "Mr. Spare's work is evidently that of a young man of talent." However, "What is more important is the personality lying behind these various influences. And here we must credit Mr. Spare with a considerable fund of fancy and invention, although the activities of his mind still find vent through somewhat tortuous channels. Like most young men he seems to take himself somewhat too seriously". Our critic ends his review with the observation that Spare's "drawing is often more shapeless and confused than we trust it will be when he has assimilated better the excellent influences upon which he has formed his style."

Two years later another anonymous review (this time of The Starlit Mire, for which Spare provided ten drawings) suggests, "When Mr. Spare was first heard of six or seven years ago he was hailed in some quarters as the new Beardsley, and as the work of a young man of seventeen his drawings had a certain amount of vigour and originality. But the years have not dealt kindly with Mr. Spare, and he must not be content with producing in his majority what passed muster in his nonage. However, his designs are not inappropriate for the crude paradoxes that form the text of this book. It is far easier to imitate an epigram than to invent one."

In a 1914 review of The Book of Pleasure, the critic (again anonymous) seems resigned to bewilderment, "It is impossible for me to regard Mr. Spare's drawings otherwise than as diagrams of ideas which I have quite failed to unravel; I can only regret that a good draughtsman limits the scope of his appeal".

From October 1922 to July 1924 Spare edited, jointly with Clifford Bax, the quarterly, Golden Hind for Chapman and Hall publishers. This was a short-lived project, but during its brief career it reproduced impressive figure drawing and lithographs by Spare and others. In 1925 Spare, Alan Odle, John Austen, and Harry Clarke showed together at the St George's Gallery, and in 1930 at the Godfrey Philips Galleries. The 1930 show was the last West End show Spare would have for 17 years.

Spare's obituary printed in The Times of 16 May 1956 states:

Thereafter Spare was rarely found in the purlieus of Bond St. He would teach a little from January to June, then up to the end of October, would finish various works, and from the beginning of November to Christmas would hang his products in the living-room, bedroom, and kitchen of his flat in the Borough. There he kept open house; critics and purchasers would go down, ring the bell, be admitted, and inspect the pictures, often in the company of some of the models - working women of the neighbourhood. Spare was convinced that there was a great potential demand for pictures at 2 or 3 guineas each, and condemned the practice of asking £20 for "amateurish stuff". He worked chiefly in pastel or pencil, drawing rapidly, often taking no more than two hours over a picture. He was especially interested in delineating the old, and had various models over 70 and one as old as 93.

But Spare did not entirely disappear. During the late 1930s he developed and exhibited a style of painting based on a logarithmic form of anamorphic projection which he called "siderealism". This work appears to have been well received. In 1947 he exhibited at the Archer Gallery, producing over 200 works for the show. It was a very successful show and led to something of a post-war renaissance of interest.

Public awareness of Spare seems to have declined somewhat in the 1960s before the slow but steady revival of interest in his work beginning in the mid-1970s. The following passage in a discussion of an exhibit including Spare's work in the summer of 1965 suggests some critics had hoped he would disappear into obscurity forever. The critic writes that the curator of the exhibit

has resurrected an unknown English artist named Austin Osman Spare, who imitates etchings in pen and ink in the manner of Beardsley but really harks back to the macabre German romanticism. He tortured himself before the first war and would have inspired the surrealist movement had he been discovered early enough. He has come back in time to play a belated part in the revival of taste for art nouveau.

Robert Ansell summarized Spare's artistic contributions as follows:

During his lifetime, Spare left critics unable to place his work comfortably. Ithell Colquhoun supported his claim to have been a proto-Surrealist and posthumously the critic Mario Amaya made the case for Spare as a Pop Artist. Typically, he was both of these - and neither. A superb figurative artist in the mystical tradition, Spare may be regarded as one of the last English Symbolists, following closely his great influence George Frederick Watts. The recurrent motifs of androgyny, death, masks, dreams, vampires, satyrs and religious themes, so typical of the art of the French and Belgian Symbolists, find full expression in Spare's early work, along with a desire to shock the bourgeois.

== Zos Kia Cultus ==
From his early years, Spare developed his own magico-religious philosophy which has come to be known as the Zos Kia Cultus (also Zos–Kia Cultus), a term coined by the occultist Kenneth Grant. Raised in the Anglican denomination of Christianity, Spare had come to denounce this monotheistic faith when he was seventeen, telling a reporter that "I am devising a religion of my own which embodies my conception of what we are, we were, and shall be in the future."

=== Zos and Kia ===
Key to Spare's magico-religious views were the dual concepts of Zos and Kia. Spare described "Zos" as the human body and mind, and would later adopt the term as a pseudonym for himself. Biographer Phil Baker believed that Spare derived the word from the Ancient Greek words zoe, meaning life, and zoion, meaning animal or beast, with Spare also being attracted to the exotic nature of the letter "z", which rarely appears in the English language. The author Alan Moore disagreed, believing that the term "ZOS" had instead been adopted by Spare to counterbalance his own initials, "AOS", in which the A would represent the beginning of the alphabet, and the Z would represent the end. In this way, Moore argued, Spare was offering an "ultimate and transcendent expression of himself at the extremities of his own being."

Spare used the term "Kia", which he pronounced keah or keer, to refer to a universal mind or ultimate power, akin to the Hindu idea of Brahman or the Taoist idea of the Tao. Phil Baker believed that Spare had developed this word either from Eastern or Cabalistic words such as ki, chi, khya or chiah. Alternately, he thought that it might have been adopted from Madame Blavatsky in her book The Secret Doctrine, which refers to the idea of an ultimate power as Kia-yu.

=== The unconscious mind ===
"A bat first grew wings and of the proper kind, by its desire being organic enough to reach the sub-consciousness. If its desire to fly had been conscious, it would have had to wait till it could have done so by the same means as ourselves, i.e. by machinery."

— Spare on his views regarding the sub-conscious and conscious mind.

Spare placed great emphasis on the unconscious part of the mind, believing that it was the source of inspiration. He considered the conscious part of the mind to be useless for this, believing that it only served to reinforce the separation between ourselves and that which we desire.

It has been argued that Spare's magic depended (at least in part) upon psychological repression. According to one author, Spare's magical rationale was as follows, "If the psyche represses certain impulses, desires, fears, and so on, and these then have the power to become so effective that they can mold or even determine entirely the entire conscious personality of a person right down to the most subtle detail, this means nothing more than the fact that through repression ('forgetting') many impulses, desires, etc. have the ability to create a reality to which they are denied access as long as they are either kept alive in the conscious mind or recalled into it. Under certain conditions, that which is repressed can become even more powerful than that which is held in the conscious mind."

Spare believed that intentionally repressed material would become enormously effective in the same way that "unwanted" (since not consciously provoked) repressions and complexes have tremendous power over the person and his or her shaping of reality. It was a logical conclusion to view the subconscious mind as the source of all magical power, which Spare soon did. In his opinion, a magical desire cannot become truly effective until it has become an organic part of the subconscious mind.

Peter J. Carroll argues that Jungian psychology has had a heavy influence on Spare's belief, specifically that the mind has strange hidden depths in it, and that magic basically depends on activating the subconscious as much as the conscious. Despite his interest in the unconscious, Spare was deeply critical of the ideas put forward by the psychoanalysts Sigmund Freud and Carl Jung, referring to them as "Fraud and Junk."

=== Atavistic resurgence ===
Spare also believed in what he called "atavistic resurgence", the idea that the human mind contains atavistic memories that have their origins in earlier species on the evolutionary ladder. In Spare's worldview, the "soul" was actually the continuing influence of "the ancestral animals" that humans had evolved from, that could be tapped into to gain insight and qualities from past incarnations. In many ways this theory offered a unison of reincarnation and evolution, both being factors which Spare saw intertwined which furthered evolutionary progression. For these reasons, he believed in the intimate unity between humans and other species in the animal world; this was visually reflected in his art through the iconography of the horned humanoid figures. Although this "atavistic resurgence" was very different from orthodox Darwinism, Spare greatly admired the evolutionary biologist Charles Darwin; in later life he paid a visit to the Kentish village of Downe, where Darwin had written his seminal text On the Origin of Species (1859).

=== Magic and sigils ===
A sample of sigils created by Austin Osman Spare

Spare "elaborated his sigils by condensing letters of the alphabet into diagrammatic glyphs of desire, which were to be integrated into postural (yogalike) practices—monograms of thought, for the government of energy." Spare's work is contemporaneous with Hugo Ball's attempts "to rediscover the evangelical concept of the 'word' (logos) as a magical complex image"—as well as with Walter Benjamin's thesis that "Mediation, which is the immediacy of all mental communication, is the fundamental problem of linguistic theory, and if one chooses to call this immediacy magic, then the primary problem of language is its magic. Spare's 'sentient symbols' and his 'alphabet of desire' situate this mediatory magic in a libidinal framework of Tantric—which is to say cosmological—proportions." (An alphabet of desire modelled after Spare's ideas has since been developed by Peter J. Carroll amongst others, especially in his influential Liber Null, a sourcebook of chaos magic.)

Following his experience with Aleister Crowley and other Thelemites, Spare developed a hostile view of ceremonial magic and many of those occultists who practised it, describing them as "the unemployed dandies of the Brothels" in The Book of Pleasure.

== Personal life ==
Spare was often described as kind and down-to-earth by his friends. A lifelong animal lover, he took care of many animals that he found near his home and was a member of the Royal Society for the Prevention of Cruelty to Animals; in many photographs, he can be seen wearing the organisation's badge.

== Death ==
In May 1956, Spare's appendix burst and he was admitted to South Western Hospital in London's Stockwell district, where doctors noted that he had also been suffering from anaemia, bronchitis, gall stones, and hypertension. He died at the hospital on the afternoon of 15 May 1956, at the age of 69. He was buried alongside his father at St. Mary's Church in the Ilford area of London.

== Legacy and influence ==
=== In art ===
In 1964, the Greenwich Gallery held an exhibition of Spare's work accompanied by a catalogue essay by the Pop Artist Mario Amaya, who believed that Spare's artworks depicting celebrities, produced in the late 1930s and 1940s, represented "the first examples of Pop art in this country." Furthermore, he proclaimed that Spare's automatic drawings "predicted Abstract Expressionism long before the name of Jack [sic] Pollock was heard of in England." London's The Viktor Wynd Museum of Curiosities, Fine Art & Natural History has a permanent gallery dedicated to his work – The Spare Room.

A portrait of an old man with a beard, by Spare, was shown on the BBC Television programme Antiques Roadshow in March 2020, and was described as being very different in style to his usual work.

=== In esotericism ===
Some of Spare's techniques, particularly the use of sigils and the creation of an "alphabet of desire", were adopted, adapted and popularized by Peter J. Carroll in the work Liber Null & Psychonaut. Carroll and other writers such as Ray Sherwin are seen as key figures in the emergence of some of Spare's ideas and techniques as a part of a magical movement loosely referred to as chaos magic.

=== In music ===
Bulldog Breed, a British psychedelic music band, have a song entitled "Austin Osmanspare" on their one and only 1970 album Made in England.

Asgærd, a British prog rock band, released an album in 1972 called In the Realm of Asgærd, which contained a song named "Austin Osman Spare".

John Balance of the influential early industrial music group Coil (formed in 1982) described Spare as being his mentor, and claimed that "what Spare did in art, we try to do through music."

The Polish death metal band Behemoth recorded a studio album entitled Zos Kia Cultus in Warsaw in September 2002.

=== In magic ===
"Zos Kia Cultus" is a term coined by Kenneth Grant, with different meanings for different people. One interpretation is that it is a form, style, or school of magic inspired by Spare. It focuses on one's individual universe and the influence of the magician's will on it. While the Zos Kia Cultus has very few adherents today, it is widely considered an important influence on the rise of chaos magic.

=== In culture ===
In 2016, a new street was named after Spare near his former home in London's Elephant and Castle area.

=== In fiction ===
Austin Spare is a supporting character in Alan Moore's The Great When where many of the details of Spare's life are intwined with fictional plot elements.

== Selected exhibitions ==
- Bruton Galleries, London, October 1907
- The Baillie Gallery, London, 11–31 October 1911
- The Baillie Gallery, London, 10–31 October 1912
- The Ryder Gallery, London, 17 April – 7 May 1912
- The Baillie Gallery, London, July 1914
- St. George’s Gallery, London, March 1927
- The Lefevre Galleries, London, April 1929
- Godfrey Phillips Galleries, London, November 1930
- Artist's studio, 56A Walworth Road, Elephant, London, Autumn, 1937
- Artist's studio, 56a Walworth Road, Elephant, London, Autumn, 1938
- Archer Gallery, London, 3–30 July November 1947
- The Temple Bar (Doctors), 286 Walworth Rd. London, 28 October – 29 November 1949
- The Mansion House Tavern, 12 June – 12 July 1952
- The White Bear, London, 19 November – 1 December 1953
- Archer Gallery, London, 25 October – 26 November 1955
- The Greenwich Gallery, London, 23 July – 12 August 1964
- Alpine Club Gallery (Group Exhibition), London, 22 June – 2 July 1965
- The Obelisk Gallery, London, 1972
- The Taranman Gallery, London, 2–23 September 1974
- Oliver Bradbury & James Birch Fine Art, London, 17 November – 8 December 1984
- The Morley College Gallery, London, September 1987
- Henry Boxer, London, November 1992
- Arnolfini, Bristol, 2007
- Cuming Museum, South London, September–November 2010
- Atlantis Bookshop, London, 2010
- The Viktor Wynd Museum of Curiosities, Fine Art & Natural History, October 2014 -
- Iceberg Projects, Chicago, IL, USA, April 19 - May 22 2022

== Bibliography ==
=== Books written and illustrated ===
| Title | Year | Republished |
|---|---|---|
| Earth Inferno | 1905 | Self-published |
| A Book of Satyrs | 1907 | Self-published; republished by John Lane, 1909 |
| The Book of Pleasure | 1913 | Self-published |
| The Focus of Life | 1921 | The Morland Press |
| The Anathema of Zos | 1927 | |

=== Books illustrated ===
- Behind the Veil by Ethel Rolt Wheeler. Issued by David Nutt 1906
- Songs from the Classics by Charles F. Grindrod. Published by David Nutt 1907
- The Shadow of the Ragged Stone published by Elkin Mathews. First ed 1887 (no Spare illustration). 2nd edition 1909 has a Spare illustration to the front board.
- The Equinox published by Simpkin, Marshall, Hamilton, Kent & Co. Ltd. 1909
- On the Oxford Circuit and Other Verses by Hon Mr Justice Darling. Published by Smith, Elder & Co. 1909
- The Starlit Mire by James Bertrand Russell. Published by John Lane 1911 (ed of 350 copies). Reissued London: Temple Press, 1989 (500 copies).
- Eight Poems by W. B. Yeats transcribed by Edward Pay. Published by Form at The Morland Press Ltd. 1916 (200 copies)
- Twelve Poems by J.C. Squire. Published by The Morland Press Ltd. 1916
- The Gold Tree (stories) by J.C. Squire published by Martin Secker 1917
- The Youth and the Sage by Warren Retlaw. Privately printed, 1927. Reissued: Oxon: Mandrake Press, 2003.

=== Magazines edited ===
- Form - A Quarterly of the Arts 1916–1922
- Golden Hind 1922–1924

The majority of the books listed above are available as modern reprints. For a more complete listing see Clive Harper's Revised Notes Towards A Bibliography of Austin Osman Spare.

Significant titles published since Spare's death include Poems and Masks, A Book of Automatic Drawings, 1974, The Collected Works of Austin Osman Spare, 1986, Axiomata & The Witches' Sabbath, 1992, From The Inferno To Zos (3 Vol. Set), The Book of Ugly Ecstasy, 1996, Zos Speaks, 1999, The Valley of Fear, 2008, Dearest Vera, 2010, Two Grimoires, 2011, and Psycopathia Sexualis 2022.
